= Governor's Palace, Chandigarh =

Proposed government building in Chandigarh, India

Governor's Palace is a proposed government building in Chandigarh, India. The building was designed by Le Corbusier, with help from Pierre Jeanneret, a Swiss architect and Corbusier's cousin, but it wasn't built. A model of the building was on display at the Le Corbusier Centre, Zürich, Switzerland and Chandigarh Architecture Museum, Sector 10, Chandigarh. Planning and development of the city of Chandigarh is considered a unique experiment of the modern independent India. A very detailed model was built by Alexander Gorlin and was published as an analytical exploded defragmentation on July 29, 1980.

== Design ==
Le Corbusier’s design for the Governor’s Palace featured a pyramidal massing composed of five ascending levels, each set back to create a stepped silhouette against the Himalayan backdrop. The lowest level comprised a brise‑soleil screen and colonnade, providing shaded transition from the ground plaza to the ceremonial interior. Above this sat the governor’s reception and state rooms, guest apartments, and at the summit a private apartment and terrace "barsati" capped by an inverted concrete canopy. A continuous water trough at the fourth level collected monsoon rains, visually detaching the hovering upper form from its solid base and reinforcing the metaphor of a "floating crown" over the city.

It was positioned at the terminus of the Chandigarh Capitol’s central axis linking the Secretariat, Assembly and High Court, the palace was intended to mediate between civic ritual and natural landscape. Le Corbusier conceived three sequential plazas separated by water channels with the City Plaza, Capitol Plaza and Palace Forecourt. It culminates at the palace steps overlooking an expansive "Charbagh"‑style garden. This formal Persianesque layout drew inspiration from Mughal terraces at Pinjore and Rashtrapati Bhavan, embedding Chandigarh within India’s garden‑city tradition despite its modern materials and geometric rigor.
