= The Architectural Work of Le Corbusier =

The Architectural Work of Le Corbusier, an Outstanding Contribution to the Modern Movement
UNESCO World Heritage Site
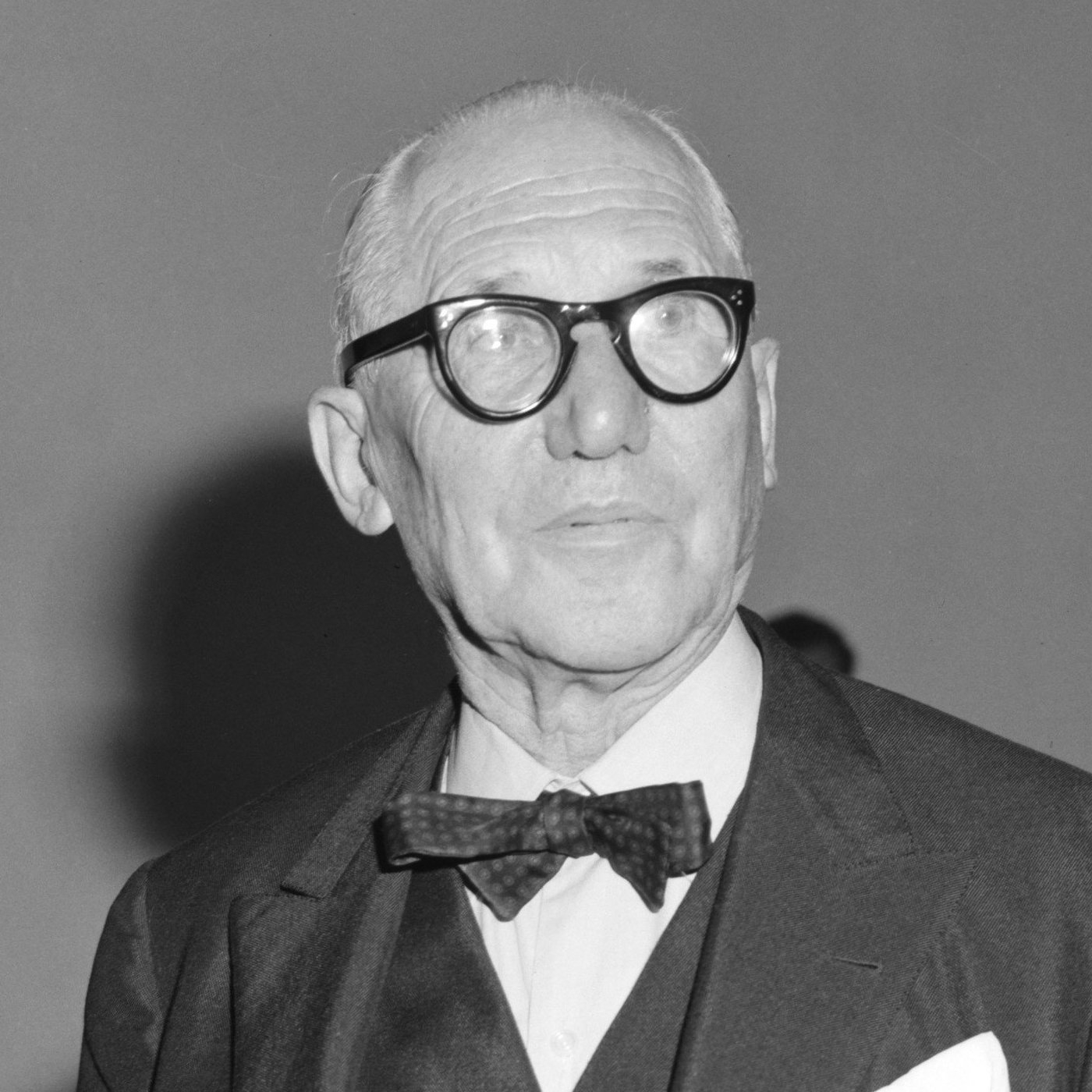
- Le Corbusier, the architect whose buildings are designated as a World Heritage Site
- Includes: 17 sites on three continents
- Criteria: Cultural: i, ii, vi
- Reference: 1321
- Inscription: 2016 (40th Session)
- Area: 98.5 ha (0.380 sq mi)
- Buffer zone: 1,409.4 ha (5.442 sq mi)

The Architectural Work of Le Corbusier (Note: The official name of the site in the UNESCO listing is The Architectural Work of Le Corbusier, an Outstanding Contribution to the Modern Movement.) is a World Heritage Site consisting of a selection of 17 building projects in seven countries by the Franco-Swiss architect Le Corbusier. These sites demonstrate how modern movement architecture was applied to respond to the needs of society and show the global reach of an architectural style and an architect. Charles-Édouard Jeanneret (1887–1965), known as Le Corbusier, was an architectural designer, urban planner and writer who was one of the pioneers of what is now referred to as modern architecture. He was born in Switzerland and acquired French nationality in 1930. He designed buildings all over the world, and he was an important representative of the 20th-century modernist movement, which introduced new architectural techniques to meet the needs of the changing society. He revolutionised urban planning and was a founding member of the Congrès International d'Architecture Moderne (CIAM).

Modern architecture, also called "the modern movement", is an architectural movement that was prominent in the 20th century. Modern architecture developed from the principles of functionalism (i.e. that form should follow function) and minimalism, resulting in constructions with little ornament, usually built with recently developed techniques and newly available materials (particularly glass, steel, and concrete). The properties that comprise this site are of various building types and include individual houses, apartment buildings, a factory, a chapel, a monastery, a legislative assembly, a museum and a cultural centre. The group of sites was inscribed as a World Heritage Site in 2016, during the 40th session of the World Heritage Committee held in Istanbul.

== Nomination history ==
In 2006, France nominated a list of 14 properties designed by Le Corbusier to its tentative list. Other sites from 5 countries were also nominated and submitted as a serial site along with the French entries. In 2009, the WHC decided to postpone their review of the properties until 2012. They asked for a better justification for both the selection of the sites and Le Corbusier's influence on architecture. The International Council on Monuments and Sites, which advises UNESCO on cultural World Heritage site nominations, also noted that "the omission of both the urban planning schemes and the public buildings at Chandigarh is a serious gap" in the nomination. In 2011, a modified nomination consisting of 19 sites was submitted, but this was deferred by the WHC so that the justification of the "outstanding universal value" point could be improved. In 2015 the nomination was further modified to only 17 sites, but now included the Capitol Complex in Chandigarh. This was accepted by the WHC and the site was inscribed as a World Heritage Site in 2016, during the 40th session of the World Heritage Committee held in Istanbul.

The properties chosen were deemed to represent an "outstanding response to some of the fundamental issues of architecture and society in the 20th century" and to have "had a significant influence over wide geographical areas". The site as a whole was deemed to meet criteria 1 (masterpiece of human creative genius), 2 (important interchange of human values over a span of time) and 6 (directly associated with ideas of outstanding universal significance) of the selection criteria for cultural sites.

In 2025, the WHC noted that the conservation status of all the sites is "generally satisfactory", with maintenance/restoration continuing in various sites, and future restoration planned in other sites. They also requested that the next review be done by December 2026.

== Sites ==
List of the sites
Name	Picture	Location	UNESCO ID Property area	Coordinates	Description
Maisons La Roche et Villa Jeanneret	A room with a high ceiling. An inclined walkway leads to an upper floor.	Paris, France	1321-001 0.097 ha (0.24 acres)	48°51′7″N 2°15′55″E	La Roche-Jeanneret house is a pair of semi-detached houses in the 16th arrondissement of Paris. Maison La Roche was designed for Raoul La Roche to display his collection of Cubist and Purist works of art. Maison Jeanneret was designed for Albert Jeanneret (Le Corbusier's brother), his wife and their two children. The properties house the museum and offices of the Fondation Le Corbusier. In the La Roche house, Corbusier implemented what he called the "architectural promenade", which says that architecture is designed to be appreciated in motion, not from a privileged vantage point. Spatial continuity is achieved through numerous openings and the elimination of partitions and doors that usually divide space. There is also the use of architectural polychromy derived from purism, which contributes to the perception of space. In the Jeanneret house, an "inverted plan" reverses the traditional layout of the house. The garden is on the terrace instead of the ground floor, while the floor meant for the living and reception areas is moved to just below the roof terrace. In both houses the facades are not load-bearing, which allowed the addition of the long ribbon windows.
Petite villa au bord du lac Léman	A house at the edge of a body of water	Corseaux, Switzerland	1321-002 0.04 ha (0.10 acres)	46°28′6″N 6°49′46″E	Villa "Le Lac" Le Corbusier is a residential building on Lake Geneva in Corseaux, designed by Le Corbusier and his cousin, Pierre Jeanneret, between 1923 and 1924. The building was designed for Le Corbusier's parents, and makes use of three of Le Corbusier's Five Points of Architecture: the free plan, the roof terrace, and the "ribbon" window. One side of the house faces the lake, while there are fences on the other three sides. The lake-facing facade, is clad in aluminium sheeting and is traversed almost its entire length by a 11 m (36 ft) horizontal ribbon window. The garden terrace also has a small studio. In the house the bedrooms are clustered around the main living area in the east of the house, while the kitchen, bathroom and toilets are clustered in the west.
Cité Frugès de Pessac	A three storey building	Pessac, France	1321-003 2.179 ha (5.38 acres)	44°47′56″N 0°38′52″W	Cité Frugès de Pessac is a housing development located in Bordeaux, that was commissioned by the industrialist Henri Frugès in 1924. It was intended to function as worker housing and designed by Le Corbusier and Pierre Jeanneret, who were responsible for the master plan and individual buildings. The architects treated the site as an experiment in the standardisation of building construction. The houses were designed on a basic architectural type called B1L, composed of two levels of one and a half bays each. To avoid repetition, one or more extra bays were added which lead to five different types of houses.
Maison Guiette	A three storey building	Antwerp, Belgium	1321-004 0.0103 ha (0.03 acres)	51°11′1″N 4°23′36″E	Maison Guiette, also known as Les Peupliers, is a house in Antwerp, designed by Le Corbusier in 1926 and built in 1927. It was the studio and living quarters of René Guiette, a painter and art critic. The ground floor includes the living room (away from the street), the kitchen and pantry. The first floor has the master bedrooms at the front and the children's bedrooms at the rear, with the bathrooms between them. The second floor includes the maid's room, a storage room and a studio. Since this was Corbusier's first commission abroad, it represents European recognition of his work.
Maisons de la Weissenhof-Siedlung	A long two-storey building	Stuttgart, Germany	1321-005 0.1165 ha (0.29 acres)	48°48′0″N 9°10′40″E	This listing comprises two buildings of the Weissenhof Estate, a housing estate in Stuttgart. It was built for the 1927 Deutscher Werkbund exhibition, an international showcase of modern architecture. Corbusier created a marked distinction between the load-bearing structure and the partitioning elements of the houses, to which he applied his Dom-ino construction system. The house has a cubic form, with the presence of visible stilts and a recessed basement.
Villa Savoye et loge du jardiner	A two-storey building	Poissy, France	1321-006 1.036 ha (2.56 acres)	48°55′28″N 2°1′42″E	Villa Savoye is a villa and gate lodge in Poissy, on the outskirts of Paris. It was built between 1928 and 1931 using reinforced concrete. The house is a simple parallelepiped with four equal faces, raised on stilts and capped by a roof terrace and a solarium. Features that are common with other works by Le Corbusier include the elimination of the ground floor, the raised section on stilts, the emphasis placed on glazed surfaces and the use of polychromy to erase the texture of the materials used. The grounds also include a small house meant for a gardener's family which was the archetype of the minimum housing that Le Corbusier and Pierre Jeanneret presented at the first CIAM congress in Frankfurt in 1929. It was designed for 3 to 4 people, offers only 30 m^{2} (320 sq ft) of living space. It includes four small rooms flanking a living room.
Immeuble Clarté	The facade of an eight-storey building mostly made up of windows	Genève, Switzerland	1321-007 0.15 ha (0.37 acres)	46°12′1″N 6°9′23″E	Immeuble Clarté is an eight-storey apartment building in Geneva. The design process for the building started from 1928 and it was built between 1931 and 1932. It has 48 free-plan units of diverse configurations and sizes. The building presents façades on both the north and south sides which are made up of sliding windows and glass doors. On the south side there are long exterior balconies on the first, third and fifth floors, while on the north side these are present on the second, fourth and sixth floors. The balconies serve as sunshades for the lower floors and are equipped with canvas awnings.
Immeuble locatif à la Porte Molitor	An apartment building	Boulogne-Billancourt, Paris, France	1321-008 0.032 ha (0.08 acres)	48°50′36″N 2°15′5″E	Immeuble Molitor is an eight-storey apartment building in Paris built between 1931 and 1934. It has fully glazed facades on its east and west sides, made up of tempered glass and glass bricks. Each storey is divided into 2 or 3 apartments. Corbusier bought the 7th and 8th floors of the building, converted them into an apartment and studio which served as his base in the city until his death in 1965.
Unité d'habitation Marseille (Cité radieuse)	A large apartment building	Marseille, France	1321-009 3.648 ha (9.01 acres)	43°15′41″N 5°23′46″E	Unité d'habitation was a prototype of a new housing model intended for mass production. It is seventeen storeys high and was designed to house 1,600 people. The building has different types of apartments, as well as shops and communal rooms. The apartments are of eight different combinations of three standardised modules (the kitchen and common room; the master bedroom, toilet and bathroom; and the children's bedroom). The combinations range from a single-person apartment to one for families with up to eight children. The terrace has a gymnasium, a three-classroom preschool and a stage for theatrical performances.
La Manufacture à Saint-Dié		Saint-Dié-des-Vosges, France	1321-010 0.762 ha (1.88 acres)	48°17′27″N 6°57′1″E	The Claude and Duval hosiery factory is the only industrial building designed by Le Corbusier. It consists of three storeys raised on piles and was completed in 1950. The three floors of the building house the workshops for the processing of fabric and garment pieces and have glazed facades that are protected by concrete sunshades, the first time this was done in Europe. The roof terrace has the administration offices, a meeting room and an archive room.
Curutchet House	A three-storey house	La Plata, Argentina	1321-011 0.027 ha (0.07 acres)	34°54′41″S 57°56′30″W	The Curutchet House in La Plata was commissioned by Dr. Pedro Domingo Curutchet, a surgeon, in 1948. The three-storey building is organised into two separate sections: the work area and the living quarters. The consulting rooms are located on the first floor. The living quarters are situated at the rear of the building. The roof of the consulting rooms forms the terrace for the living and dining rooms. Bedrooms make up the top floor. The building testifies to the internationalisation of modern architecture after World War II.
Chapelle Notre-Dame-du-Haut de Ronchamp	A triangular building with a cylindrical structure behind it	Ronchamp, France	1321-012 2.734 ha (6.76 acres)	47°42′16″N 6°37′15″E	Notre-Dame du Haut is a Roman Catholic chapel in Ronchamp. It was built in 1950. Unlike traditional churches which take the shape of the cross, the Notre-Dame du Haut has an asymmetrical plan, consisting of a single room without side aisles or a transept. Light is used to differentiate sub-spaces; the altar is highlighted in white or coloured light, diffused by the southern facade, which is pierced with multiple openings of varying sizes. There is a gap between the walls and the shell roof which itself is made up of two 6 cm (2.4 in) thick concrete membranes, spaced 2.26 m (7 ft 5 in) apart.
Cabanon de Le Corbusier	A small cabin made of wood	Roquebrune-Cap-Martin, France	1321-013 0.198 ha (0.49 acres)	43°45′36″N 7°27′49″E	Cabanon de Le Corbusier is a small cottage, less than 15 m^{2} (160 sq ft) in area, having only two windows. It was built in 1951 as Le Corbusier's vacation home. It was designed as the archetype of the minimal cell and includes a sleeping area, a work area, a toilet area, and a sink.
Complexe du Capitole	A large building with a pool in front of it	Chandigarh, India	1321-014 66 ha (163.09 acres)	30°45′27″N 76°48′20″E	The Chandigarh Capitol Complex is a government compound in Chandigarh. It comprises three buildings: the Palace of Assembly (pictured), the Secretariat Building and the High Court, four monuments (the Open Hand Monument, Geometric Hill, the Tower of Shadows and the Martyrs Monument) and a lake. The High Court features a parasol-shaped roof sloping towards a central gutter. This form, inspired by Mughal architecture, symbolises "the protective shelter of the law". Corbusier also designed nine abstract tapestries to be hung in the courtrooms. The Palace of Assembly features the hyperboloid shell of the skylight's roof and a sickle-shaped canopy covering the portico. These demonstrate Corbusier's use of the plasticity and strength of reinforced concrete. All three buildings also include the use of concrete Brise soleil (sun shading), to reduce heat in the climate of Chandigarh.
Couvent Sainte-Marie-de-la-Tourette	A multi-storey building built on a slope	Éveux, France	1321-015 17.923 ha (44.29 acres)	45°49′10″N 4°37′21″E	Couvent Sainte-Marie-de-la-Tourette is a Dominican Order monastery completed in 1960. It has five storeys, two of which are underground, and includes 104 cells. The building is based on a U-shaped plan and draws inspiration from Cistercian convents. It is sited on a steep slope, but adapts to the incline due to the use of stilts. The upper two levels house the monks' cells, the middle level houses the library and study rooms, while the lower two levels are for communal use and include the refectory.
Musée National des Beaux-Arts de l'Occident	A building with a walkway leading up to it	Tokyo, Japan	1321-016 0.93 ha (2.30 acres)	35°42′55″N 139°46′33″E	The main building of the National Museum of Western Art was designed by Le Corbusier. It is the only representative example of his work in the Far East. The museum was built to house the collection of works gathered by the industrialist Kōjirō Matsukata. The building is constructed on two levels and has a roof terrace. The central section is an atrium that is illuminated by skylights. The building also features other elements of Le Corbusier's architecture, including stilts and a ramp.
Maison de la Culture de Firminy	A building next to a playing field	Firminy, France	1321-017 2.601 ha (6.43 acres)	45°22′59″N 4°17′21″E	Maison de la Culture is a cultural centre located in Firminy, in the Loire region of France. The oblong building is 112 metres in length, and it is located along the crest of a cliff. The cross-section of the building is an inverted trapezoid with a concave roof. The curved roof is supported by cables stretched between two facades, a new technical solution by the architect. The west facade of the building cantilevers over the cliff edge. Access to the building, which is raised on stilts, is via a ramp and a porch located on the east facade. Le Corbusier adorned the south wall with a relief decoration at the request of the then mayor of Firminy. The composition is structured around the lines of a broken cross and incorporates some themes which were dear to him in his painted and sculpted work, including bulls.

== Location maps ==
Location of sites throughout the world (French sites excluded)	Location of European sites in and around France

== See also ==
- List of World Heritage Sites in France
- Bauhaus and its Sites in Weimar, Dessau and Bernau
- List of Gaudí buildings#UNESCO World Heritage Site
- The 20th-Century Architecture of Frank Lloyd Wright
- The works of Jože Plečnik in Ljubljana – Human Centred Urban Design
