= Chandigarh Capitol Complex =

UNESCO World Heritage Site
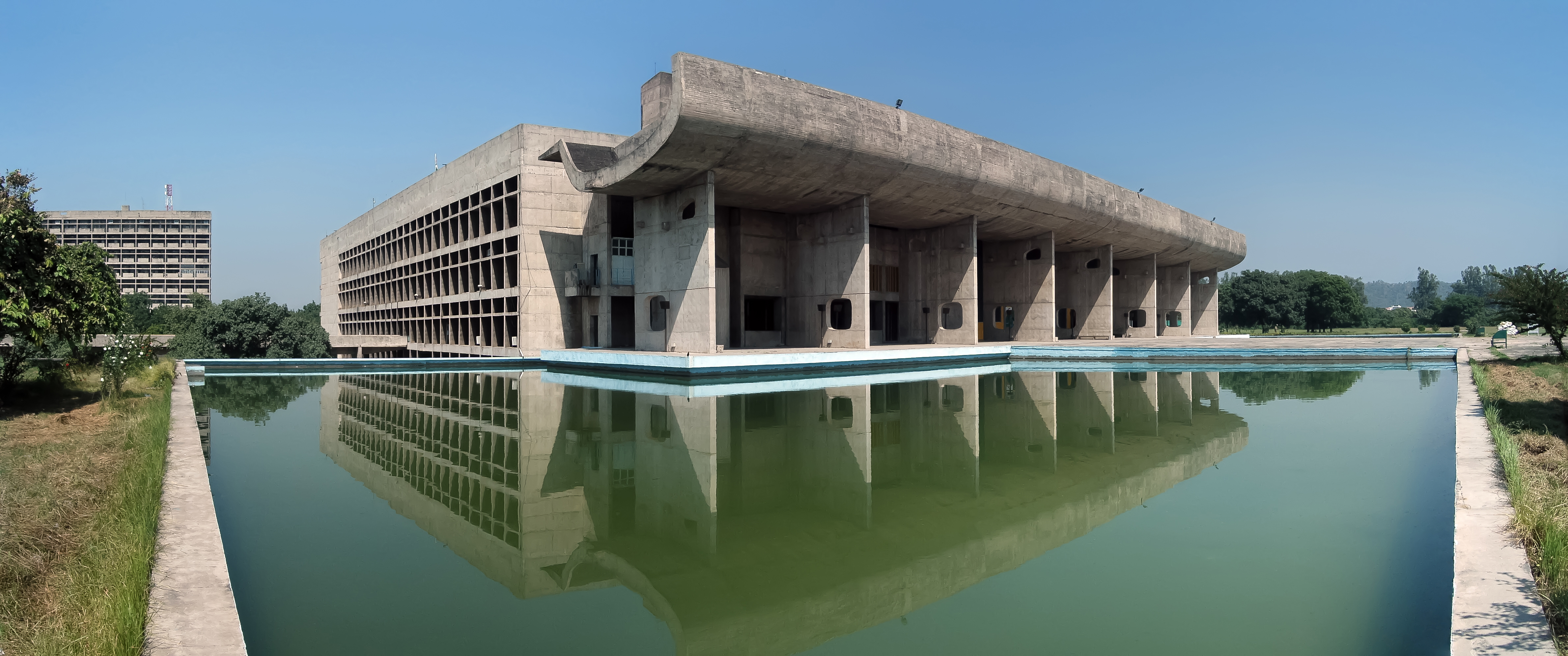
- Palace of Assembly at the Capitol Complex

- Location within India
- Official name: Complexe du Capitole
- Location: Chandigarh, Chandigarh capital region, India
- Part of: The Architectural Work of Le Corbusier, an Outstanding Contribution to the Modern Movement
- Includes: Palace of Assembly, Secretariat Building, Punjab and Haryana High Court, Open Hand Monument
- Criteria: Cultural: (i), (ii), (vi)
- Reference: 1321rev-014
- Inscription: 2016 (40th Session)
- Area: 66 ha (160 acres)
- Buffer zone: 195 ha (480 acres)
- Coordinates: 30°45′33″N 76°48′17″E

Chandigarh Capitol Complex is a government compound designed by Swiss-French architect Le Corbusier and his co-workers in Chandigarh, India.

It comprises three buildings: the Palace of Assembly, Secretariat Building and the High Court plus four monuments (Open Hand Monument, Geometric Hill, Tower of Shadows and the Martyrs Monument) and a lake.

Spreading over an area of around 100 ha (0.39 sq mi), it is classified as a UNESCO World Heritage Site, along with sixteen other works by Le Corbusier for its contribution to the development of modernist architecture.

Le Corbusier designed the "Tower of Shadows", an experimental construction, in such a way that not a single ray of sun enters it from any angle. The north side of this tower remains open because the sun never shines from this direction. Le Corbusier used the same principle for other Capitol Complex buildings as well.

== History and planning ==
The Capitol Complex was conceived in the aftermath of India's Partition (1947) when the previously shared capital of Punjab, Lahore, was lost to Pakistan, after Partition of India. New Delhi's leadership, seeking a modern symbol for independent India, decided to build a new capital for the state of Punjab in northern India. Jawaharlal Nehru, India's first Prime Minister, envisioned Chandigarh as a "new city, a symbol of India's freedom". In 1950, Nehru tasked American architect Albert Mayer and his Polish colleague Matthew Nowicki with a preliminary plan, but after Nowicki's untimely death in 1950 and Mayer's withdrawal, the task was reassigned. The Punjab government's engineers went to Europe and, on advice of Mayer, invited Le Corbusier to take over the project. Le Corbusier accepted in 1951, on the condition that his cousin Pierre Jeanneret join as resident architect. Other collaborators included British architects Maxwell Fry and Jane Drew (who initially worked on housing).

Le Corbusier reworked the existing planning framework into his own vision. Rather than finishing Mayer's radial plan, he imposed a strict grid aligned with a human-like form for the city. The Capitol Complex at the "head," a commercial sector at the "heart," and civic and educational sectors along the "arms" and "legs" of the city (an anthropomorphic plan). The Capitol Complex was sited at the northern terminus of this grid, backed by the hills, symbolically crowning the city. In Le Corbusier's final design, the Capitol Complex comprised three interlocking squares containing three principal edifices (Assembly, Secretariat, High Court) plus planned but unbuilt components (a Governor's Palace and a museum). Only three of the four major buildings were constructed. The foundation stone of Chandigarh was laid on 1 November 1952.

== Architecture and design ==
The Capitol Complex is a landmark of modernist architecture, employing béton brut (exposed concrete) and pioneering construction techniques. The ensemble is noted for its sculptural forms, monumental scale, and integration of indoor and outdoor space. All three buildings are cast in rough-cast concrete with Le Corbusier's signature Brise soleil (concrete sun-shading screens) and striking cantilevers. The design reflects Le Corbusier's Cinq points de l'architecture moderne (five points of architecture): pilotis (stilts), free façade, free plan, horizontal windows, and roof gardens.

Le Corbusier applied a human-centred modular design known as the Modulor, based on human proportions, to determine dimensions and sightlines throughout the Complex. For example, the scale of the Assembly hall and the Open Hand monument align with Modulor proportions. Passive climate control features are integrated: the buildings employ double-skinned roofs (air-gap roofs) and deep brise-soleils to reduce solar heat gain, and the plaza and Legislative Assembly pools serve as reflecting pools for cooling and rainwater catchment. Landscaping and water features (including terraced gardens on building roofs) were conceived to moderate the harsh summer climate. Together these elements prefigure contemporary passive design strategies. Le Corbusier described the Complex's planning as embodying his notion of the "Radiant City," integrating nature, sunlight, and human proportions.

Key sculptural features exemplify the design approach. The Legislative Assembly building's roof is a dramatic, thin hyperbolic paraboloid shell that spans the assembly hall without internal columns, a daring engineering achievement. Walls and facades often serve as architectural ornament: vibrant primary colours are used in doors and panels (inspired by Le Corbusier's paintings), and patterned tapestries in the High Court chamber were created to provide acoustical treatment and symbolic imagery.

== Key structures ==
The Capitol Complex comprises three main "pillars of democracy" buildings arranged around a long central esplanade and several ancillary monuments.

=== Punjab and Haryana Secretariat ===
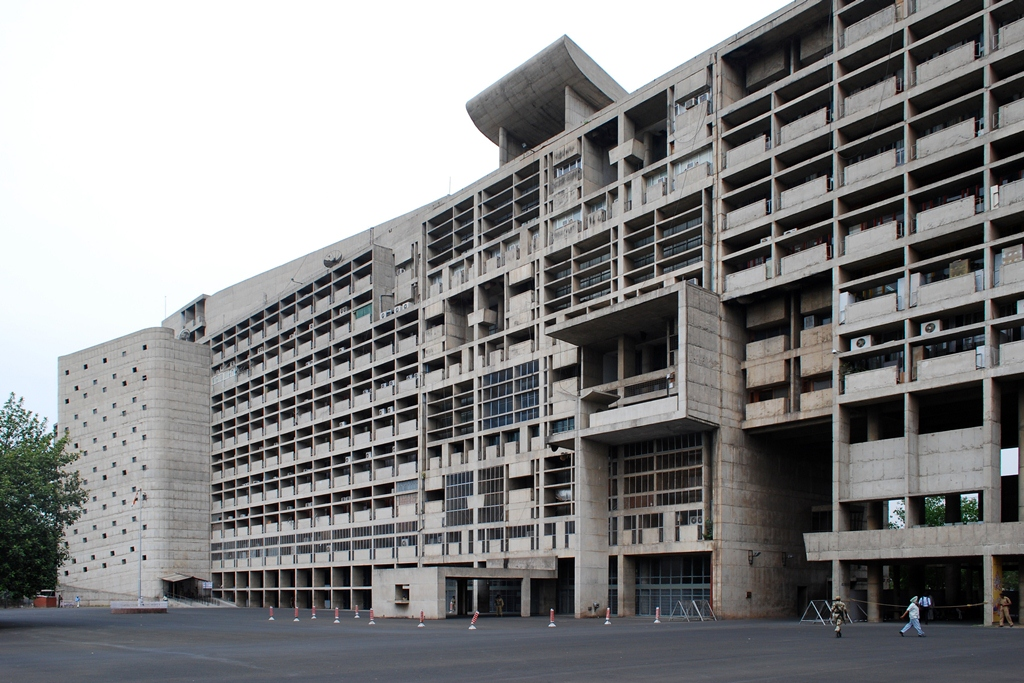
Secretariat Building

This is the largest structure in the Complex. It is a long horizontal slab of exposed concrete, about 254 m long and 42 m tall, composed of six eight-story blocks joined by expansion joints. Completed in the early 1950s, it houses the administrative offices of both Punjab and Haryana. Its western facade features continuous rows of brise-soleil and small square windows, which give the massive block a rhythmic, sculpted aesthetic. Le Corbusier intended the Secretariat's narrow plan to maximize natural light and cross-ventilation. The roof includes a cafeteria terrace and promenade terrace overlooking the city. Despite its scale, the facade is broken into modular segments, avoiding a monolithic appearance. The Secretariat sits at the northwestern edge of the Complex, with its length unifying the ensemble toward the hills.

=== Palace of Assembly ===
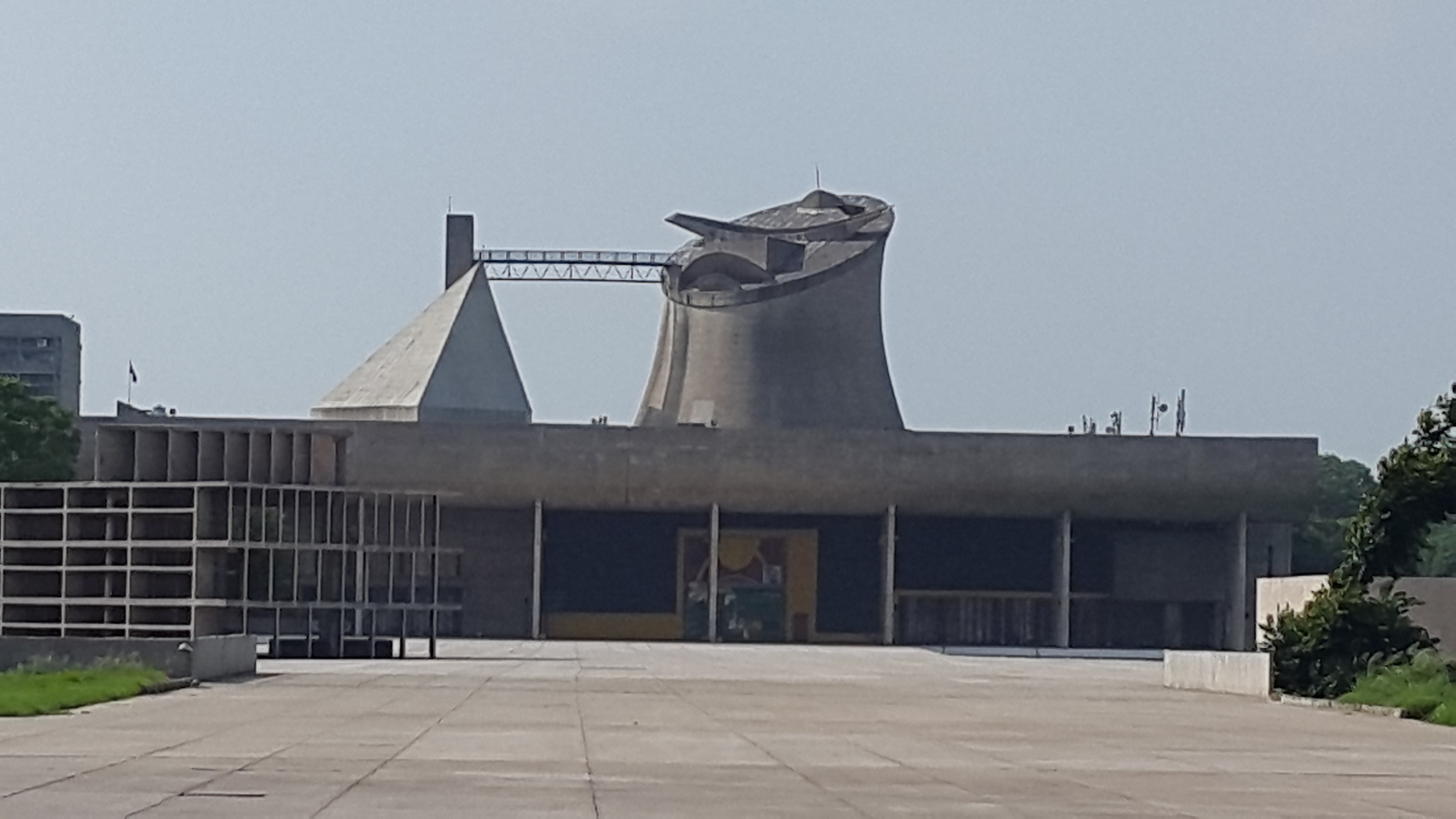
The Palace of Assembly

The assembly building is immediately adjacent to the Secretariat on the Complex's esplanade. It embodies Le Corbusier's "five points" – it is raised on pilotis (concrete columns), has a free facade, an open interior plan, ribbon windows, and a roof terrace. A monumental, upward-thrusting conical roof shelters the circular assembly chamber, giving the building a distinctive silhouette. Inside, a grid of slender columns frees the central floor plan; office spaces ring the exterior so that the central hall remains open and flexible. The building's facades include large brise-soleil screens constructed in golden proportions, and its windows frame views of the Himalayan foothills. The Assembly exemplifies Corbusier's modernist ideals: the exterior façade is divorced from internal structure (rendering it "free"), and a rooftop terrace accessible via ramps provides public access, connecting inhabitants to nature.

=== Punjab and Haryana High Court ===
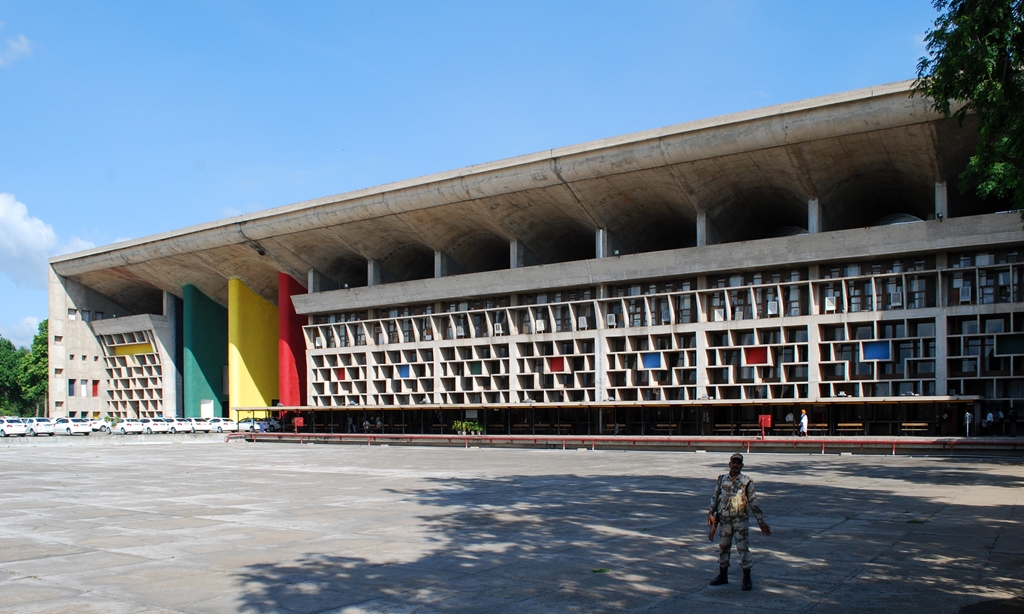
Punjab and Haryana High Court

Located across the esplanade from the Secretariat, the Court building features a grand ceremonial entrance and generous public spaces. Its most striking feature is a deep parasol roof: a wide cantilevered slab that shelters the ground-floor plaza in front of the judges' entrance, casting a continuous rhythmic arcade across the facade. Access for judges is provided by a monumental portico supported on three giant cruciform pylons painted in bright primary colours. Corbusier drew inspiration from Mughal and Indian architecture here, the oversized portico ("Buland Darwaza") and towering pylons symbolize the "Majesty of Law," signaling authority to all who enter. The concrete columns and blank wall sections of the High Court incorporate deliberate cut-outs and niches to relate scale to the human figure. Originally the building featured large brise-soleil fins on the upper levels for sun protection; however, these proved less effective against monsoon rains and have since been supplemented by a low-profile verandah. This building was also the first in Chandigarh constructed entirely of reinforced concrete.

=== Open hand monument ===
Facing the Assemblies, the Open Hand is a 26 m (85 ft)-high metal sculpture conceived by Le Corbusier himself. It features a rotating wind vane in the shape of an open palm. According to Le Corbusier's philosophy, the hand is "open to give" and "open to receive," symbolizing peace and reconciliation. The city's official emblem, it stands for democratic ‘give and take' and India's progressive ideals. Nearby are three other sculptural memorials designed by Corbusier: the Tower of Shadows, a concrete structure that studies sunlight and shade inside; Geometric Hill, an artificial earth mound topped with a concrete sundial diagramming light and darkness cycles; and the Martyrs' Memorial, a concentric ramped enclosure commemorating those who died in Punjab's partition riots.

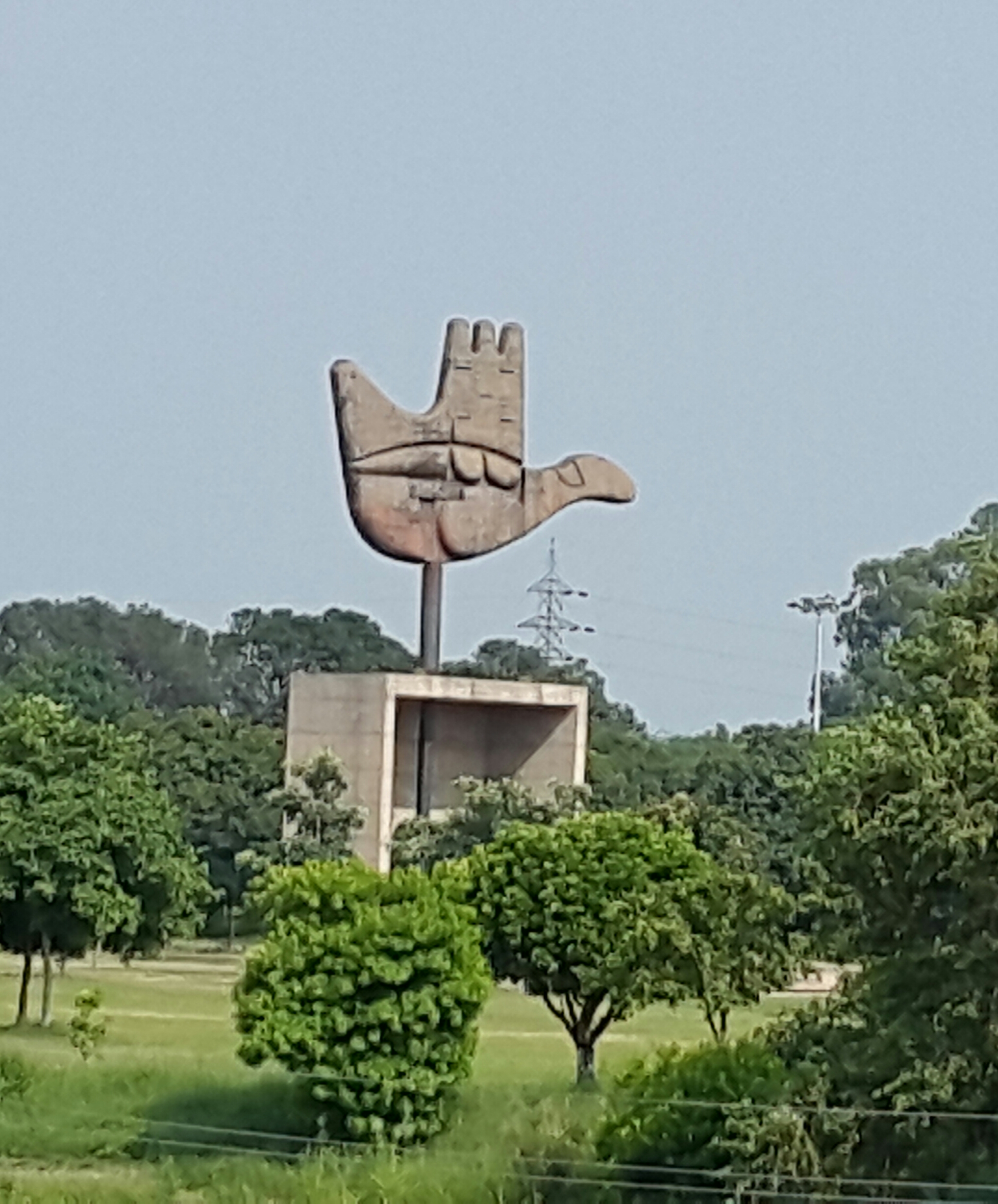
The Open Hand Monument

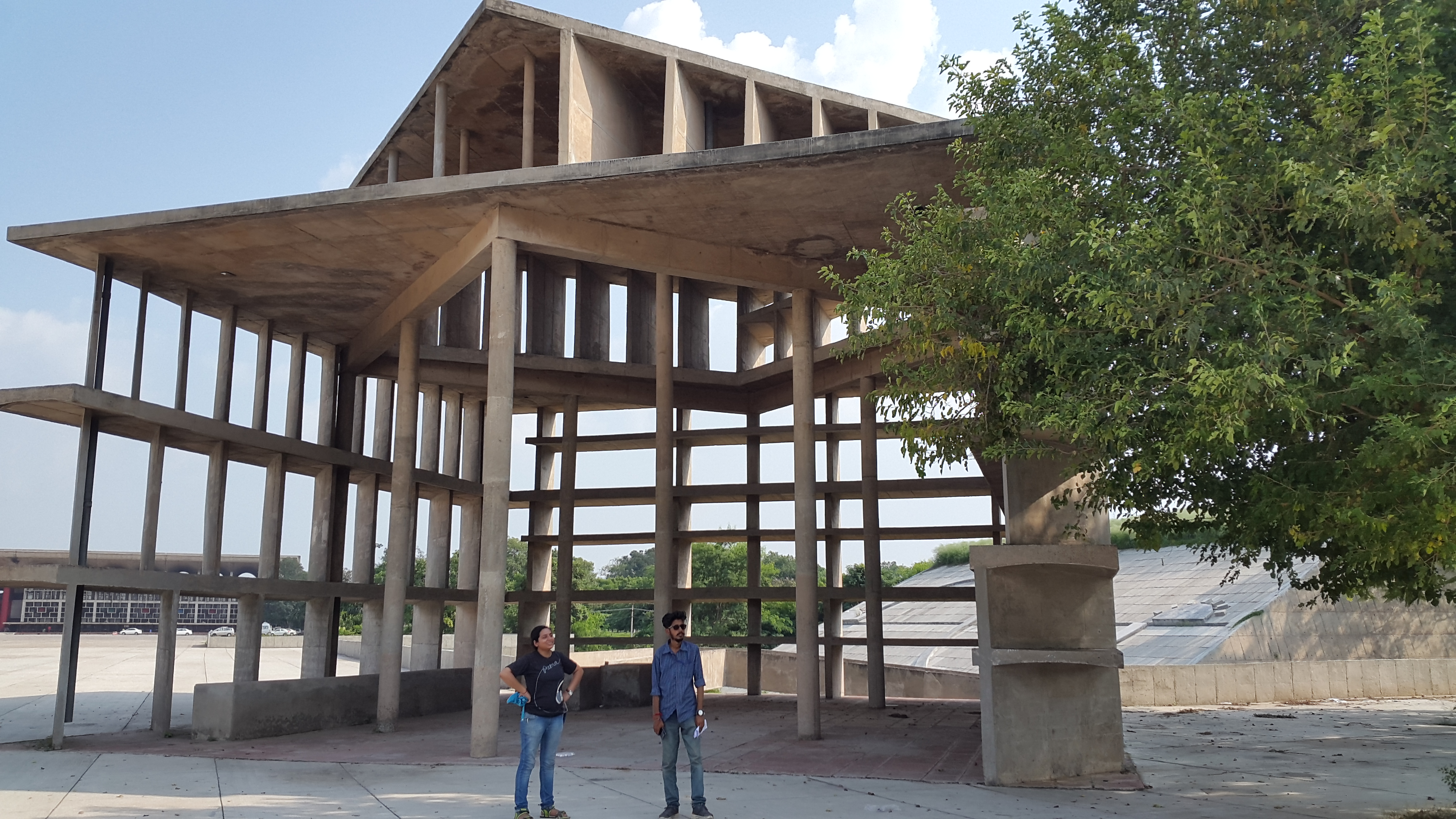
The Tower of Shadows

== Heritage significance ==
The Capitol Complex is widely regarded as one of Le Corbusier's most important works and a masterpiece of 20th-century architecture. In 2016, UNESCO inscribed Chandigarh's Capitol Complex as a World Heritage Site (under the collective listing "The Architectural Work of Le Corbusier, an Outstanding Contribution to the Modern Movement"). The UNESCO World Heritage Committee noted that the Capitol's design solutions – from urban layout to materials and climate adaptation, exemplify the "innovative and experimental spirit" of modern architecture. The Complex was specifically cited as "the focal point" of Chandigarh's plan and the most fully realized embodiment of Corbusier's Radiant City concept. UNESCO praised the Capitol Complex as "one of the most monumental compositions" of modern urban planning and for its emphasis on human proportions and technology.

Within India, the Capitol Complex is protected as a site of national importance under the Ancient Monuments and Archaeological Sites and Remains Act, reflecting its historical significance. It thus holds dual heritage status, legally a national monument and internationally a World Heritage property. UNESCO's evaluation of the Le Corbusier sites emphasized that the Capitol's integrity must be preserved, it warned that unapproved additions (such as a long-proposed governor's palace or new museum) could undermine its authenticity. The site's inclusion in the transnational listing, which spans seven countries – also symbolizes India's role in the global modernist movement, alongside Corbusier's projects in Europe, Japan, and the America.

== Contemporary relevance and conservation efforts ==
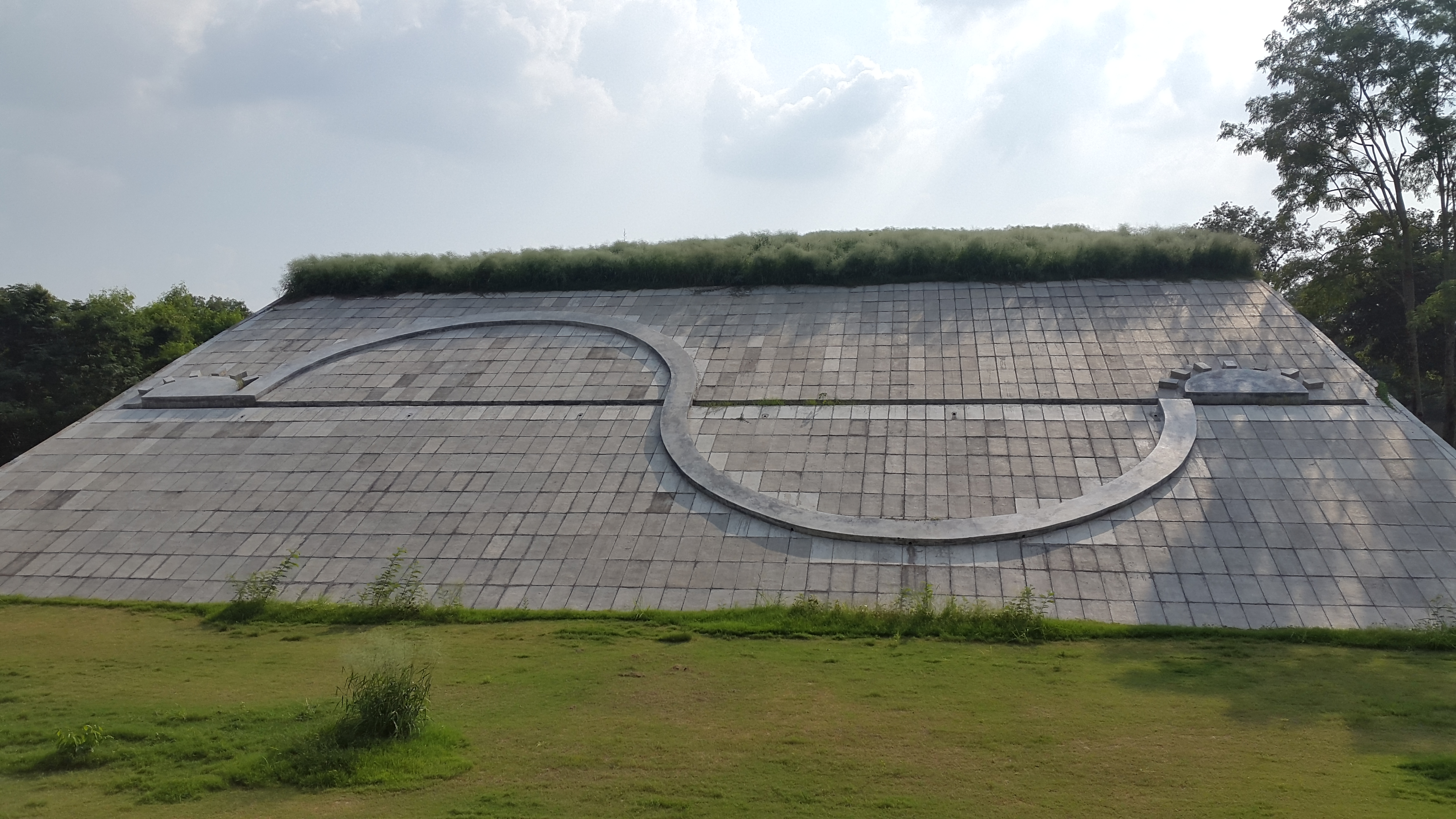
Geometric Hill

Since its World Heritage inscription, there has been heightened attention to conservation. The Chandigarh administration has formed the Chandigarh Heritage Conservation Committee (CHCC) to review alterations in the historic sectors. All major development proposals in and around the Complex now require heritage-clearance. In 2023–2024, for example, the Supreme Court of India intervened to halt unauthorized construction plans (a verandah addition to the High Court) on the grounds that any change might endanger the World Heritage status. The UNESCO dossier explicitly urged the preparation of a formal conservation plan for the Capitol Complex to guide restoration and upkeep.

Architectural critics have likewise lamented insensitive modifications and underuse. The noted historian William J. R. Curtis has pointed out that modern additions (like polished stone flooring and wooden skirting in the Assembly) have "vulgarized" interior spaces. He and others note that security installations – fences, guard posts and gates, interrupt the intended openness of the esplanade, which often lies empty even on national holidays. The imposing scale of the Complex can feel "abandoned" or under-utilized: for instance, during Curtis's 2014 visit the Assembly's reflecting pools were neglected (one drained, one filled only with rainwater). These observers argue that restoration is urgent: "if the buildings in Chandigarh are left to be knocked about further, UNESCO recognition is surely unlikely," Curtis warned.

The British monarch and architecture critic Charles III has been critical of the design of the complex describing it as an "inhuman image of government" in his 2010 book Harmony: A New Way of Looking at Our World.

In recent years the focus has been on balancing growth with preservation. The city's heritage status (though only officially granted for the first 30 sectors) has been cited to pause many development schemes. Former Chief Architect M.N. Sharma (who worked with Corbusier) has noted that Chandigarh was conceived with "big ideas and relatively small sums of money," implying that any future changes require equally visionary thinking. UNESCO and conservationists advocate for comprehensive heritage management involving experts and citizens. Meanwhile, city residents generally pride themselves on Chandigarh's reputation as India's first planned city its architecture taught in local schools and its landmarks a source of civic identity.

== See also ==
- Chandigarh capital region
- List of World Heritage Sites in India
