= Usine Claude et Duval =

French historic factory building

Coordinates: 48°17′26″N 6°57′02″E

The Claude and Duval factory (French: Usine Claude et Duval), is a factory located in Saint-Dié-des-Vosges, in the department of Vosges in France. The building is the only industrial building designed by Le Corbusier. In 2016, it was inscribed on the UNESCO World Heritage along with sixteen other works by Le Corbusier, because of its outstanding contribution to the development of modern architecture.

In 2014, the company had 80 employees.

== History ==
Company manager Jean-Jacques Duval (1913-2009), a fervent admirer of Le Corbusier's town planning theories, with the support of a few industrial friends, had his friend architect appointed town planner-consultant from 19 April 1945. The Deodatian municipality having rejected the reconstruction project of the city, Jean-Jacques Duval then asked Le Corbusier to design the reconstruction project of the family hosiery factory destroyed two-thirds by the fire in November 1944 triggered by the routed occupant.

Studies began in January 1947 and construction began in early April 1948. Construction ended three years later in 1951.

The factory opened in 1952 after its interior was fitted with furniture by Charlotte Perriand and Jean Prouvé.

The factory was classified as a historical monument in 1988. It has belonged to the same family since its construction.

== Architecture ==
The factory is built of reinforced concrete and mounted on stilts. The vertical design of the building, unusual for an industrial building, results both from the limited surface area of the footprint, from the need to store coal reserves, to park the two hundred staff bicycles and, last but not the least, to give the latter a pleasant and bright working space.

The project is also an opportunity for the architect's direct collaborators (Vladimir Bodiansky and André Wogenscky) to experiment with a life-size sunshade which, hung on the facade, would play both an aesthetic and functional role (reducing the diffusion direct light on workstations and protect fabrics with delicate colors).

The “roof terrace” is presented by Le Corbusier as an essential place of conviviality between users of buildings, whether they are residential blocks, offices or, in this case, a factory. The roof terrace must therefore combine traffic, leisure, and meeting uses.

The manufacture, completed before the Unit of Marseille, is also the first building designed using the concept of Modulor. Le Corbusier had defined this as being a range of harmonic dimensions on a human scale, universally applicable to architecture and mechanics. A series of drawings characterizing the space occupied by a 6-foot man then correlated, for illustration, a double series of numbers.

A statue located near the Grand Pont de Saint-Dié des Vosges, at the entrance to rue Thiers, recalls this concept aimed at uniting the golden ratio and modular construction.

The Claude-et-Duval clothing factory remains the only imprint of the Saint-Dié town center reconstruction project led by Le Corbusier in 1945–1946.

This global project affected industrial production activities to a sector of the city; the distance between the workplace and the employees' homes must respect the requirement of a maximum distance of fifteen minutes on foot.

== Bibliography ==
- Le Corbusier an encyclopedia, Center Georges Pompidou, Monographie collection, Paris, Book published on the occasion of the exhibition "The Le Corbusier adventure" October 1987 - January 1988, 1987 ( ISBN 2-85850-398-2 ), "various chapters including in particular pages 76, 119 and 205-206".Document utilisé pour la rédaction de l’article
- Le Corbusier by Willy Boesiger, Les Editions d'Architecture, Studiopaperback collection, Zurich, 1990 ( ISBN 3-7608-8101-7 ), "various chapters including in particular pages 86 and 88".Document utilisé pour la rédaction de l’article
- Le Corbusier by Maurice Besset, Editions d'Art Albert Skira SA, Geneva, 1992 ( ISBN 2-605-00092-3 ), "various chapters including in particular pages 81 and 182".Document utilisé pour la rédaction de l’article
- Le Corbusier, the bark and the flower by Jean-Jacques Duval, Editions du Linteau, Cherbourg, 2006 ( ISBN 2-910342-38-7 ), “memories of the instigator of the architect's visit to St-Dié”.
