= Maison de la Culture de Firminy =

Coordinates: 45.3833°N 4.2892°E

The Maison de la Culture de Firminy is a cultural establishment located in Firminy in the Loire region of France. The site was inscribed on the UNESCO World Heritage List in 2016 for its contribution to the development of modern architecture along with sixteen other works by Le Corbusier.

== History ==
The first project presented by Le Corbusier in 1956 included the Maison de la Culture and the bleachers of the municipal stadium. It was decided to dissociate the sports equipment from the cultural center in order to avoid conflicts of financing by the State, between the two ministries.

Finally, the second version of the cultural center without the bleachers was inaugurated in 1965. It is the only building designed by the architect in Firminy that is not a posthumous achievement.

== Ranking ==
It is classified as a historical monument.

The application of several sites built by Le Corbusier (the cultural center) at World Heritage of UNESCO has already been rejected in 2009 and in 2011 because of too long a list and the absence of the site of Chandigarh in India A new application file taking into account the various remarks was submitted at the end of January 2015 and proposed at the 40th session of the World Heritage Committee held in Istanbul (Turkey) from 10 to 17 July 2016. The whole is finally classified on 17 July 2016.

== Presentation ==
The cultural center was installed on an artificial cliff in the former “Razes” quarry. Its sloping facade dominates the sports complex and faces the municipal stadium.

It measures 110 meters long and 14 meters wide and is organized on 3 levels. On the south gable, Le Corbusier represented a fresco of the arts carried out in this center. The imagined roof was to be sloped and covered with a layer of earth intended to be sown by wind and birds. This technique requires very substantial foundations to support the weight of the roof. Finally, with the Stribick company, Le Corbuisier decided to make a roof suspended by pairs of cables connected to the two facades and on which concrete slabs were placed. This process is much lighter and therefore more economical.

The cultural center made up of a music room, an auditorium, a performance hall, a plastic arts room, a foyer bar to allow everyone to meet, a dance, etc.

Currently the roof is no longer waterproof and many infiltrations are visible. The Saint-Étienne Métropole project is to renovate the roof at a cost of around 8 million euros.

== See also ==
- The Architectural Work of Le Corbusier
- List of World Heritage Sites in France
