= Palace of Assembly =

Building by Le Corbusier in Chandigarh, India

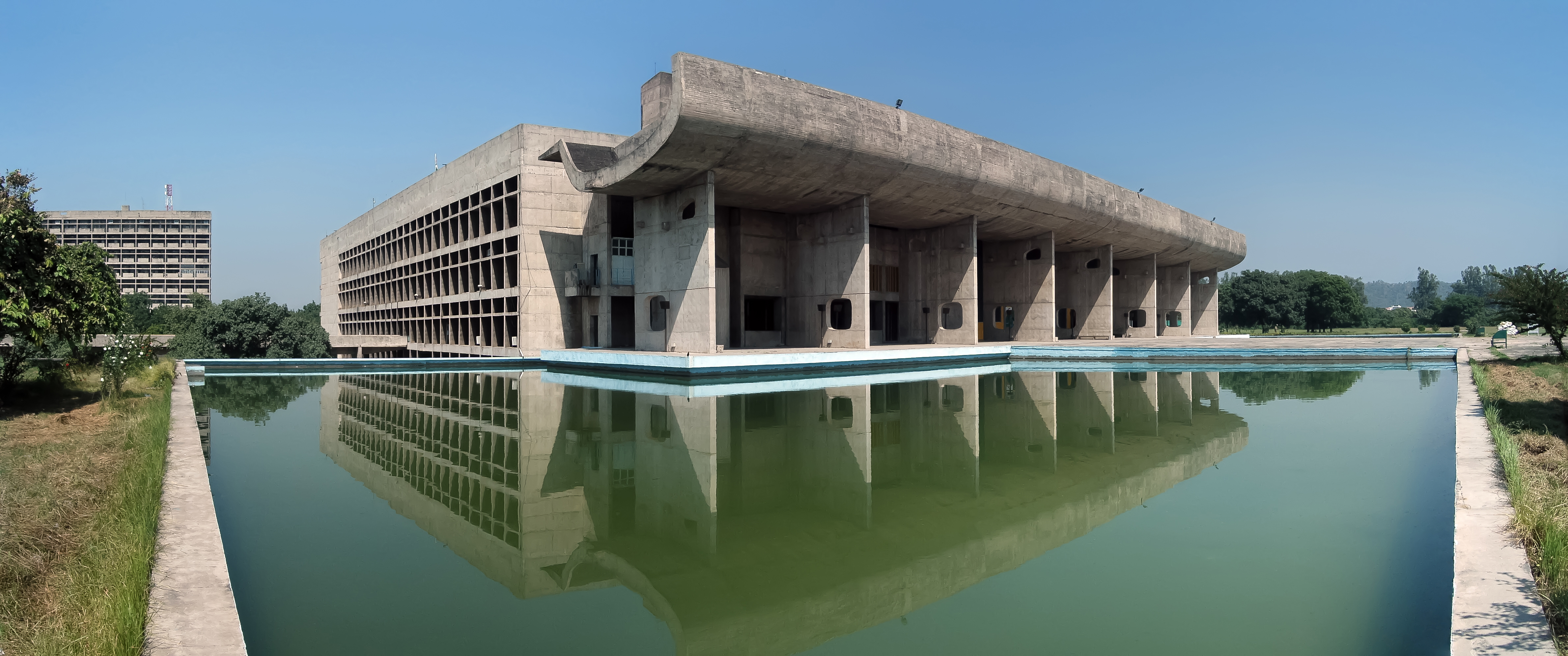

- Location within Chandigarh

General information
- Location: Chandigarh, India
- Coordinates: 30°45′40″N 76°48′11″E
- Construction started: 1951
- Completed: 1962
- Inaugurated: 15 April 1964

Design and construction
- Architect: Le Corbusier

UNESCO World Heritage Site
- Official name: The Architectural Work of Le Corbusier, an Outstanding Contribution to the Modern Movement
- Designated: 17 July 2016
- Reference no.: 1321rev

The Palace of Assembly is a building in Chandigarh, India which houses the Punjab Legislative Assembly and the Haryana Legislative Assembly. It was designed by modernist architect Le Corbusier. It is part of the Chandigarh Capitol Complex, which includes the Legislative Assembly, Secretariat and High Court. The Palace of Assembly features a circular assembly chamber, a forum for conversation and transactions, and stair-free circulation.

The building was designated as a UNESCO World Heritage Site in 2016.

== History ==
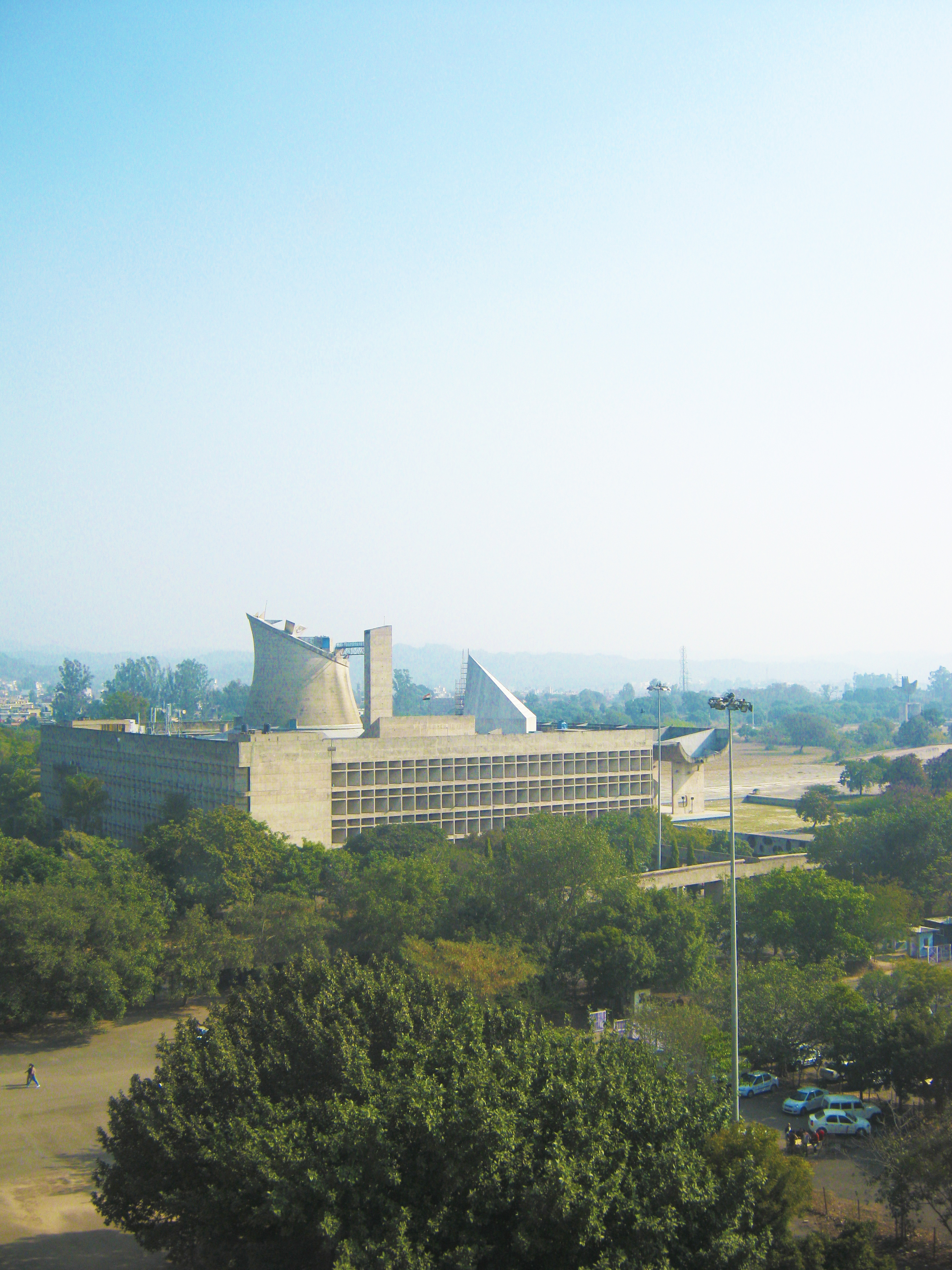
View of the building

After the partition of Punjab in 1947 following the independence of India, the divided Punjab required a new capital to replace Lahore, which was now in Pakistan. Prime Minister Jawaharlal Nehru commissioned Le Corbusier to build a new city for the capital of Punjab. This city would become Chandigarh. Nehru desired that the city's design be "unfettered by the traditions of the past, a symbol of the nation's faith in the future". Subsequently, Corbusier and his team designed not just a large assembly and high court building, but all major buildings in the city, down to the door handles in public offices. Construction of the Palace of Assembly began in 1951 and ended 11 years later in 1962. The building was inaugurated on 15 April 1964. After the Punjab Reorganisation Act, 1966 separated the new state of Haryana from the state of Punjab, Chandigarh remained capital of both states and both legislative assemblies share the same campus.

Today, many of the buildings in Chandigarh are considered modernist masterpieces, though most are in a state of neglect. In 2010, chairs from the assembly building were auctioned in London. A diplomatic attempt to stop the sale failed, as the items were "condemned" and deemed unfit for use.

== Design ==
=== Entrance ===
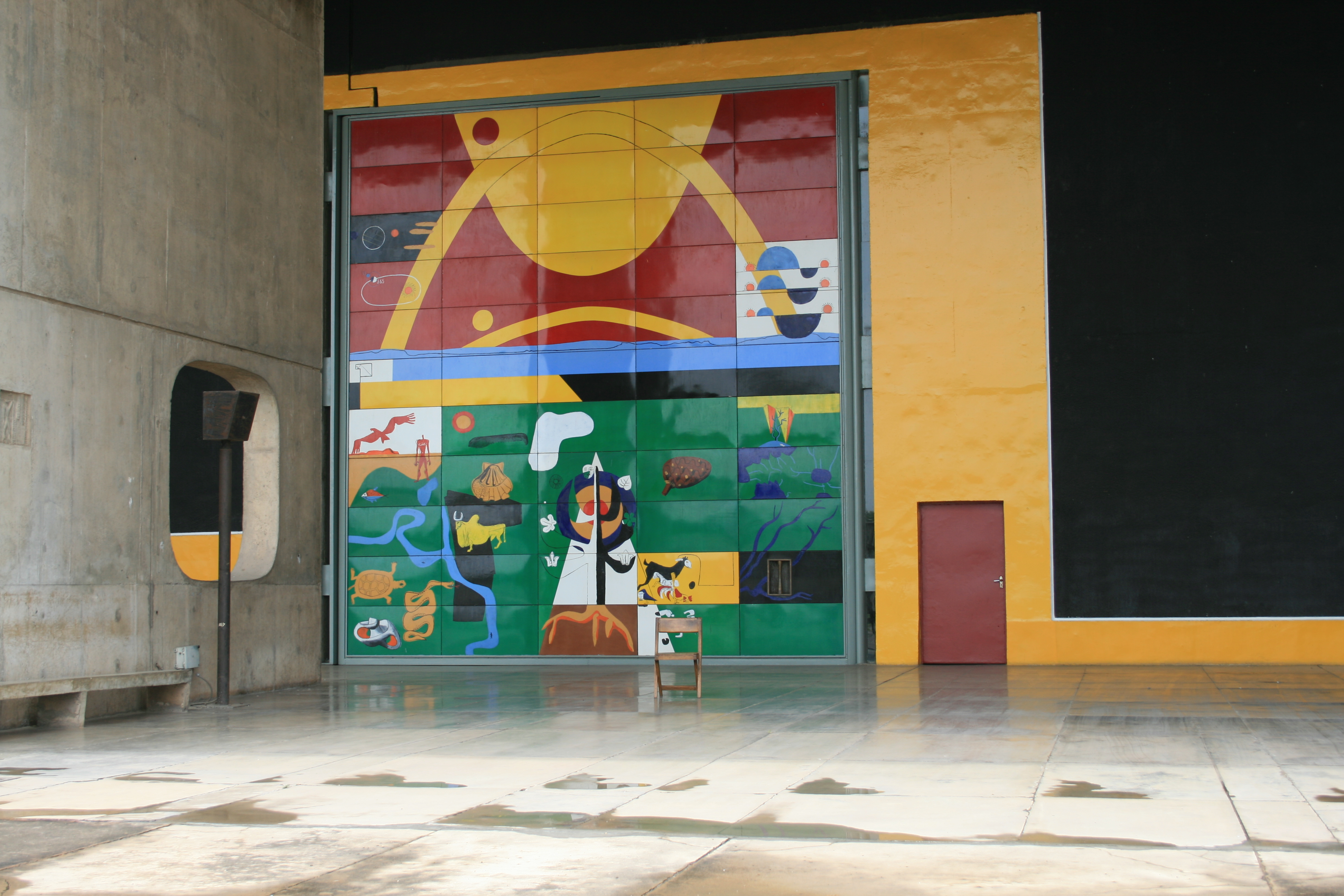
Entrance with set of doors painted by Le Corbusier

Le Corbusier wanted to include an assembly door. He consulted with Prime Minister Nehru for symbols that could be depicted on the door to represent the new India and its modern vision. Nehru, in turn, entrusted Le Corbusier to invent them himself.

The door is adorned with vibrant colours and is divided into upper and lower halves. The upper half depicts man's relationship with the cosmos and includes imagery representing solstices, lunar eclipses and the Equinox. The lower half is populated with animals and natural forms. A desert depicts the original order of the Earth, while greenery represents the Garden Of Eden. The door also displays a river, trees, bulls and turtles, and the proverbial Tree of Knowledge in the centre of the door bears fruits of knowledge. The nearly 2.3 m^{2} (25 ft^{2}) door, with its enamelled panels, was airlifted from Paris.

This entrance is opened on certain ceremonial occasions.

=== Interior layout ===
Le Corbusier believed that "architecture is circulation", and the Palace of Assembly is designed to encourage the movement of people and ideas. High ceilings and narrow columns make the space feel expansive, and ramps replace stairs to provide fluid transitions between levels. The General Assembly itself is circular – a literal interpretation of Le Corbusier's belief – and is off-centre within the space, challenging neoclassical architecture's focus on organization.

== Gallery ==
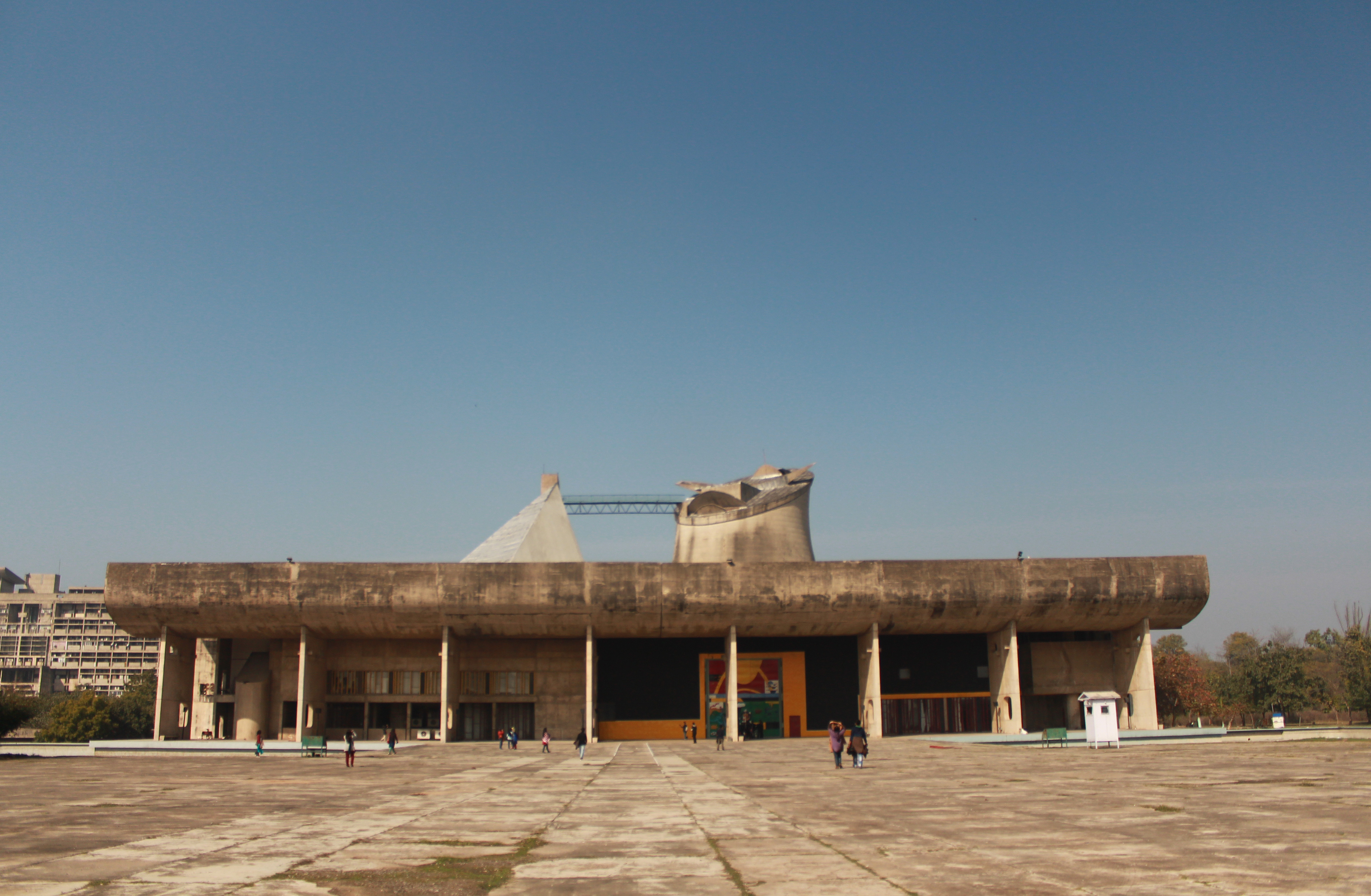
View of the building from the adjacent plaza

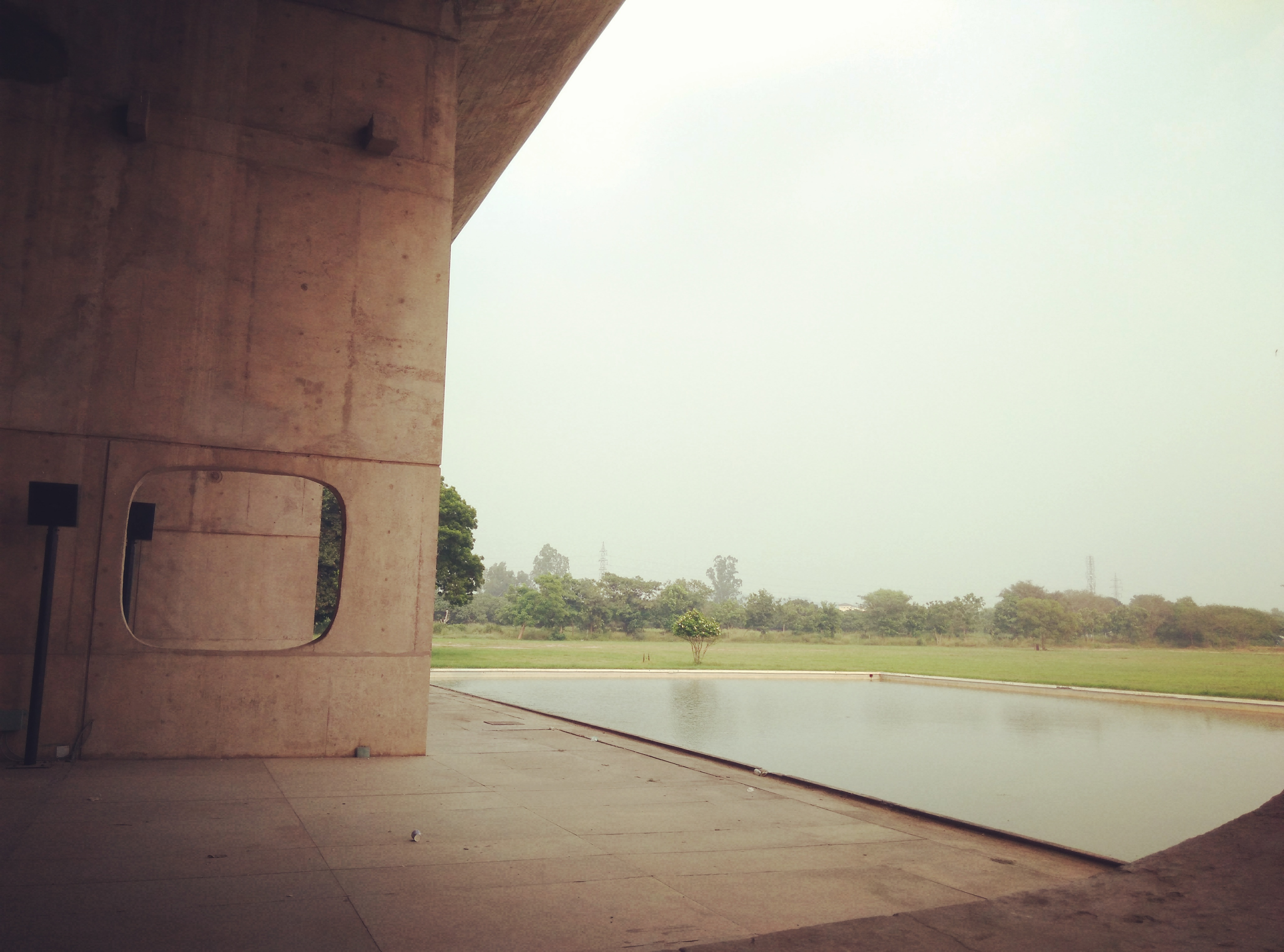
View of the pool from an outdoor corridor

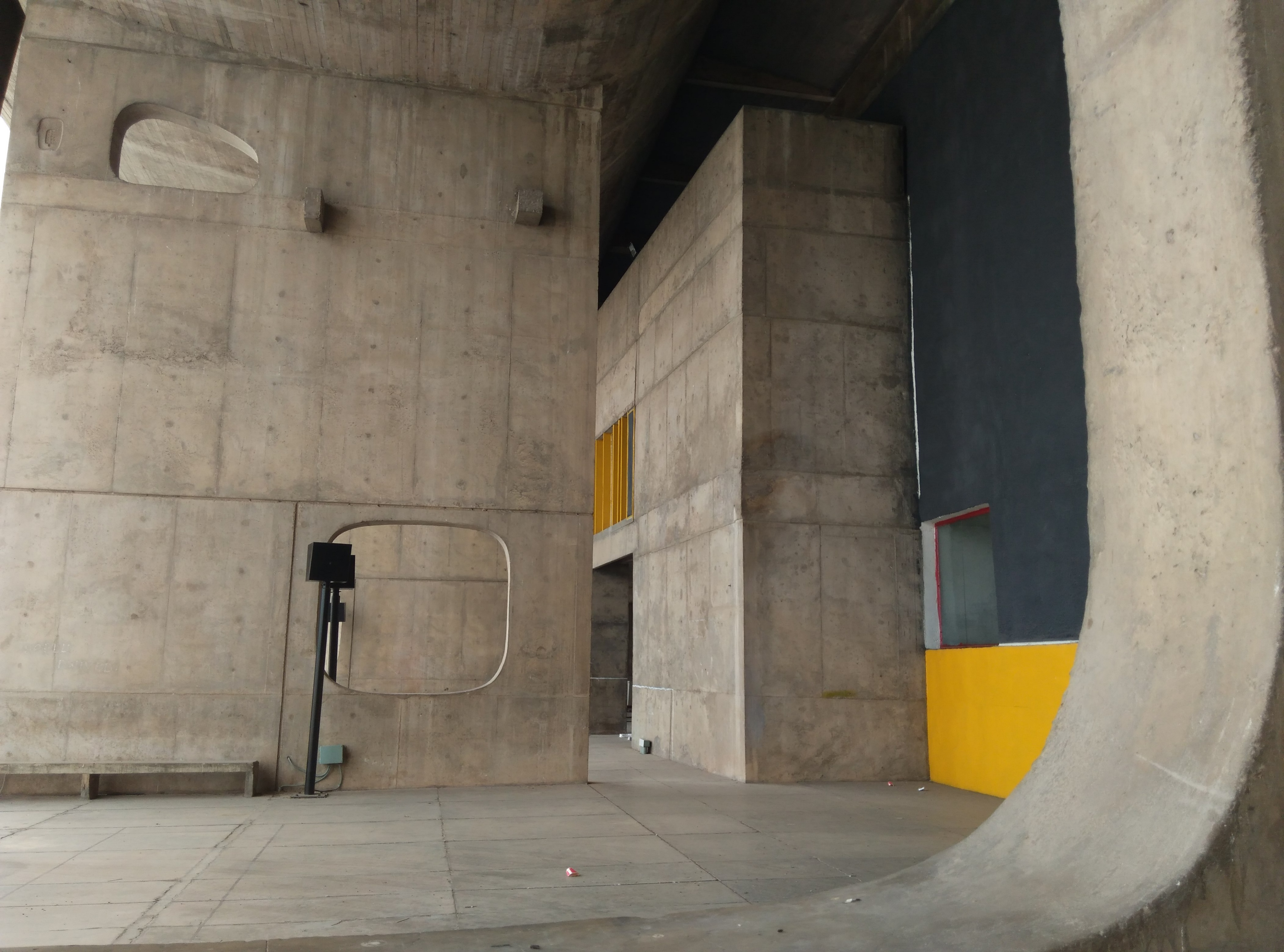
Architectural motifs

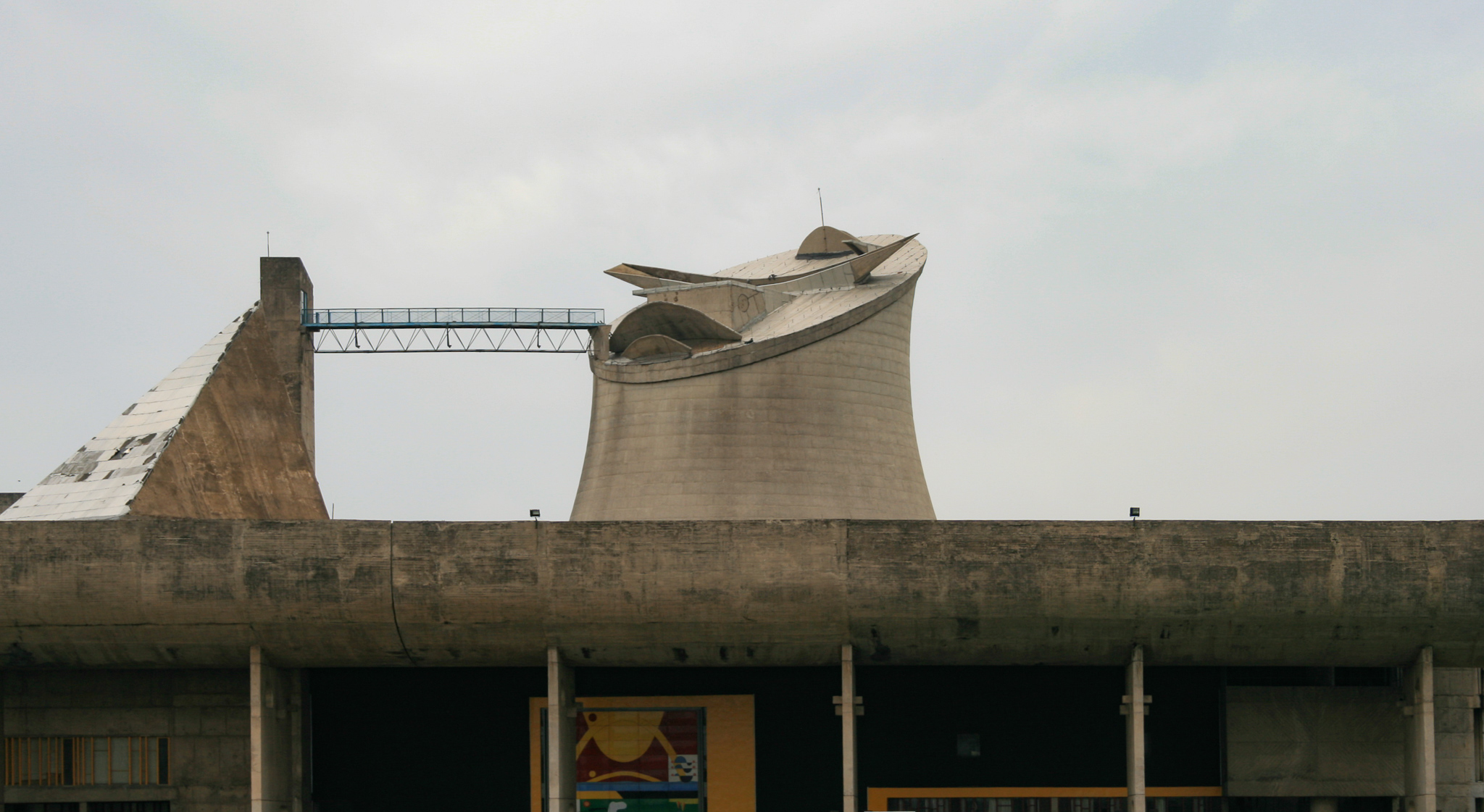
Roofline of building with hyperbolic tower visible

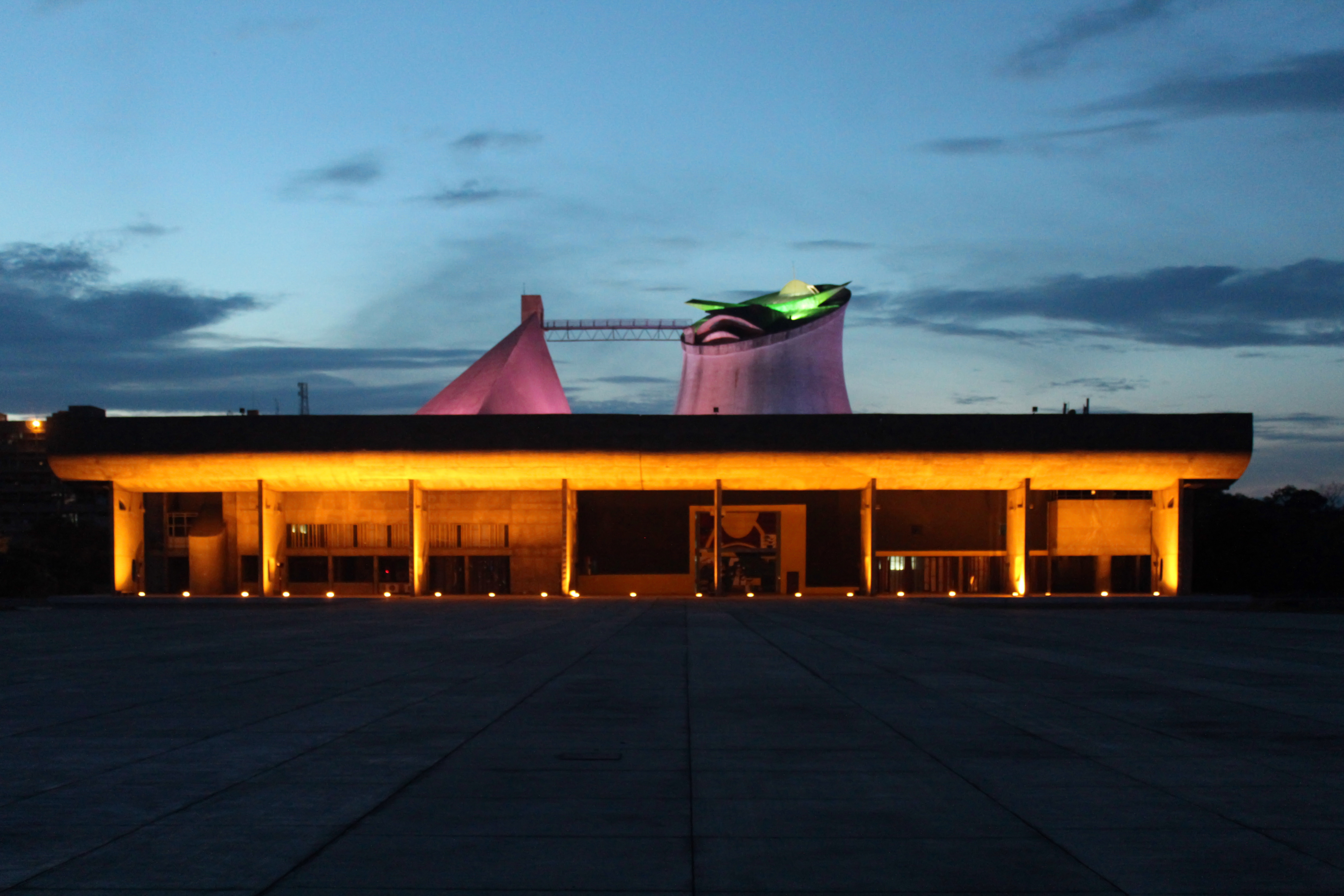
Night view of Assembly

== See also ==
- Jatiya Sangsad Bhaban, similar legislative complex in Dhaka, Bangladesh
