= Manmohan Nath Sharma =

Indian architect (1923–2016)

Manmohan Nath Sharma (4 August 1923 – 30 October 2016) was an Indian architect and a heritage activist.

He was the first chief architect of Chandigarh. He helped legendary Swiss architect, Le Corbusier in designing Chandigarh. He was Le Corbusier's first assistant.
