= Secretariat Building, Chandigarh =

Building in Chandigarh, India

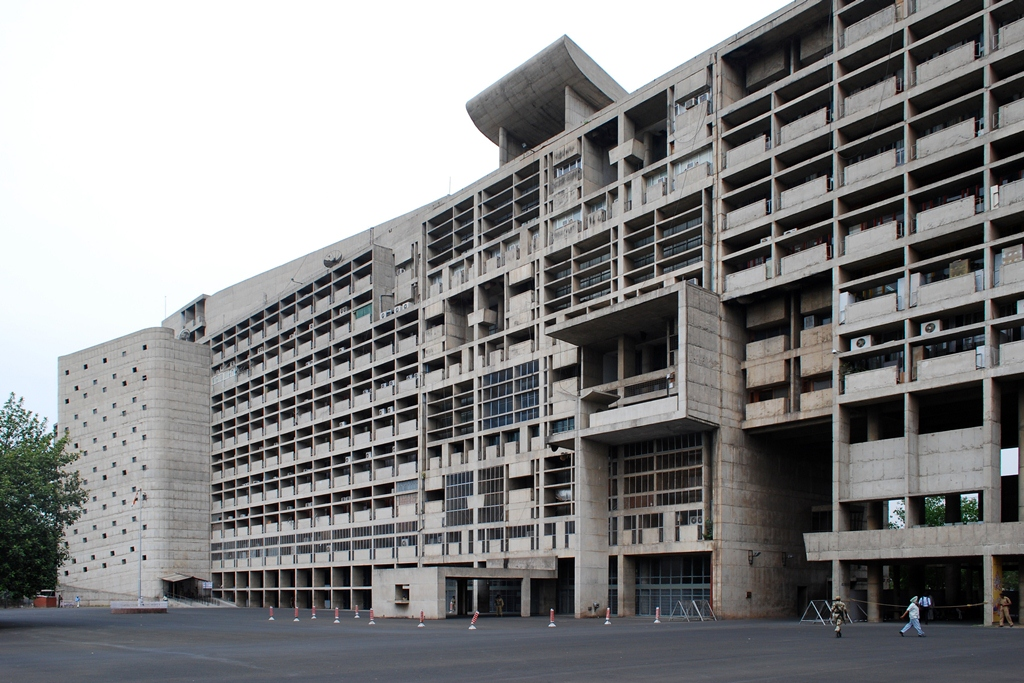
- Facade of the Secretariat building

- Location within Chandigarh

General information
- Coordinates: 30°45′40″N 76°48′02″E
- Completed: 1953

Design and construction
- Architect: Le Corbusier

UNESCO World Heritage Site
- Official name: The Architectural Work of Le Corbusier, an Outstanding Contribution to the Modern Movement
- Designated: 17 July 2016
- Reference no.: 1321rev

Secretariat Building is a Le Corbusier-designed building in Chandigarh completed in 1953 to house the offices of the Chief Secretary of the Indian state of East Punjab. Since the Punjab Reorganisation Act, 1966 split East Punjab into Haryana and Punjab, Chandigarh has been the capital of both states and the Secretariat Building is shared by their respective Chief Secretaries.

The Secretariat Building is one of three buildings and three monuments in the Chandigarh Capitol Complex, which is one of 17 sites dubbed "The Architectural Work of Le Corbusier" inscribed in July 2016 as a World Heritage Site by UNESCO.

== Gallery ==
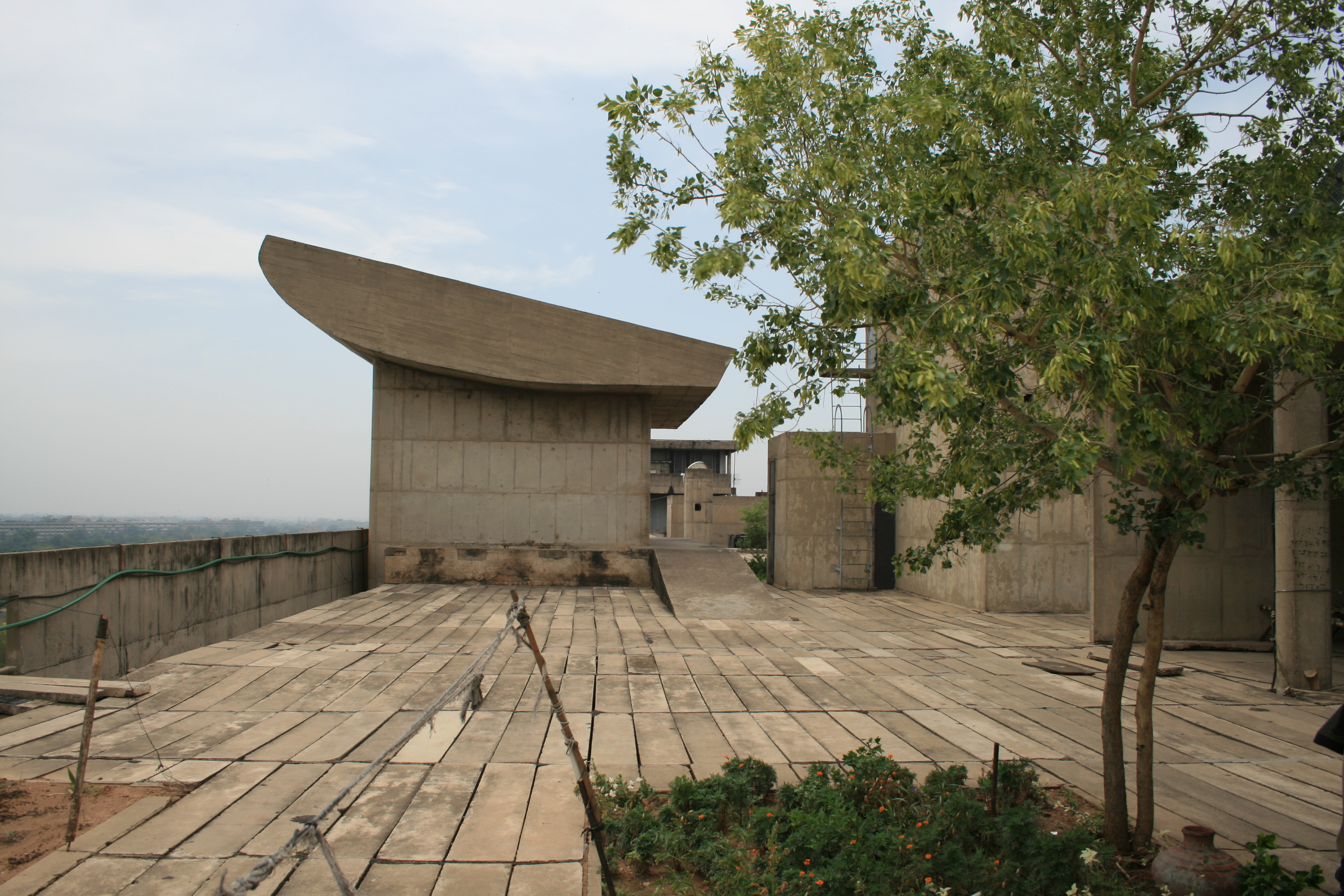
Roof of the building

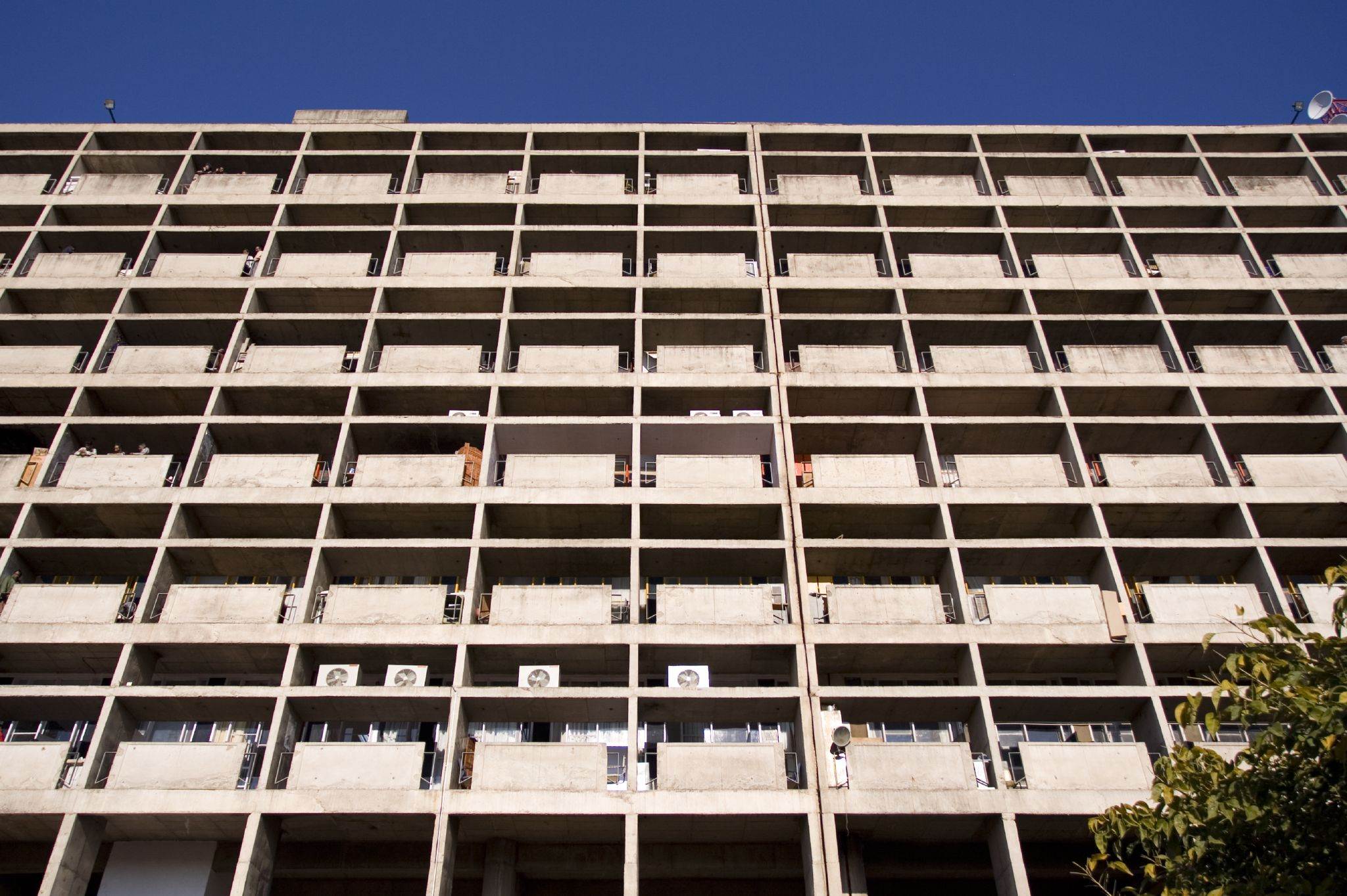
Building facade

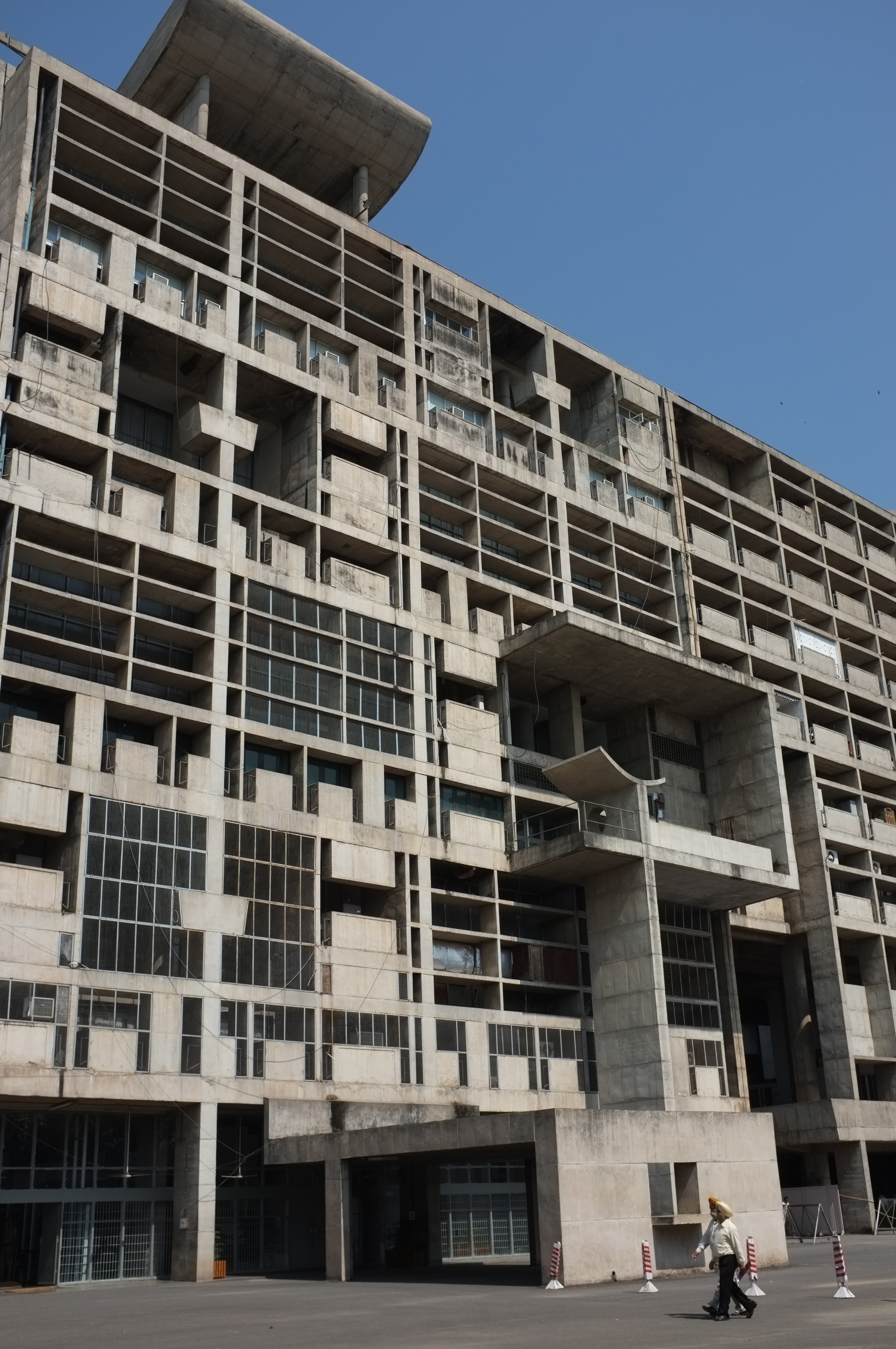
View of the Secretariat Building from ground level

== See also ==
- List of World Heritage Sites in India
- List of Brutalist structures
