= Brise soleil =

Architectural sunshade

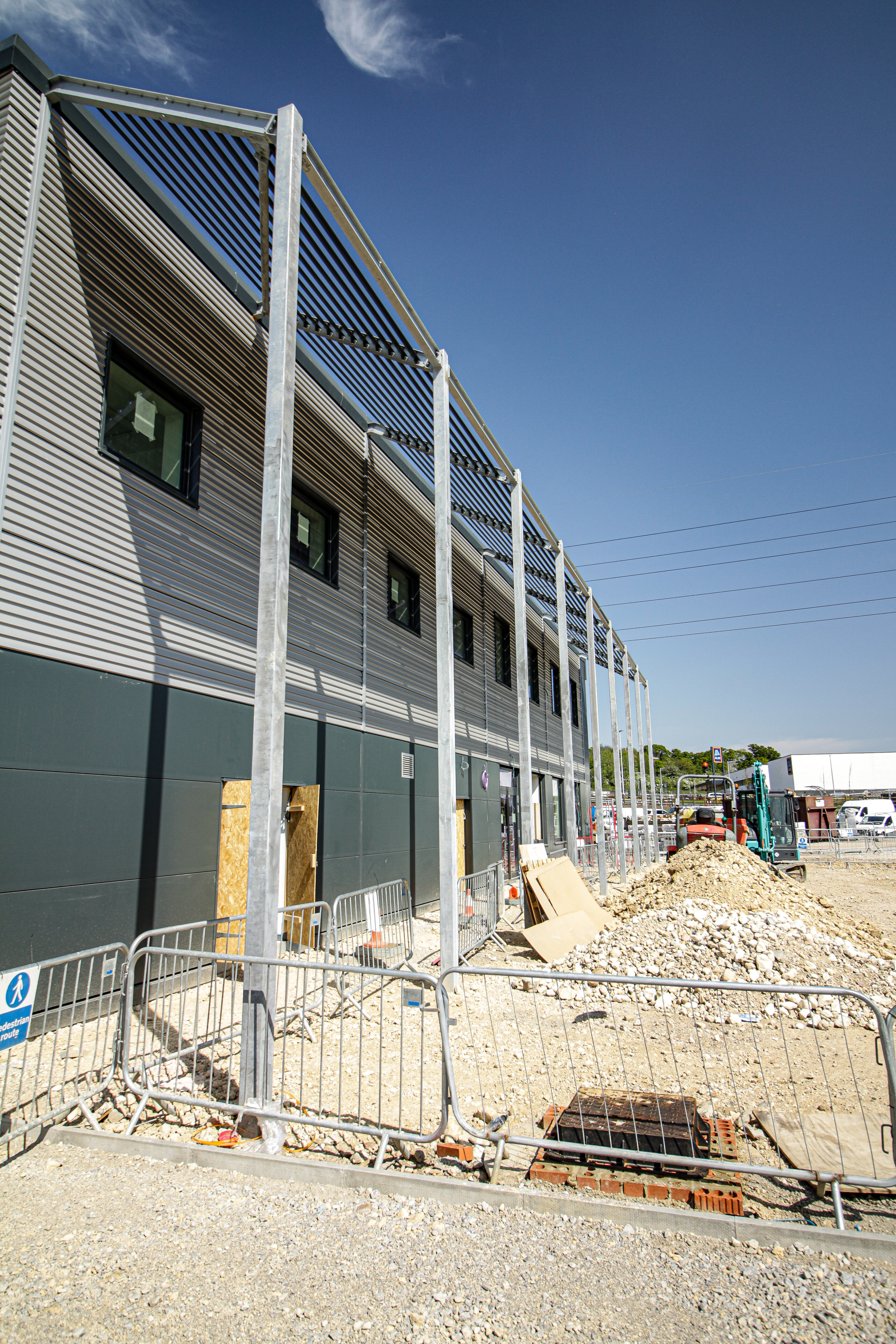
A basic brise soleil at the Charles Wells Brewery for Wells & Co in Bedford, England. This photo was taken of the south facing elevation at noon in December, a little before the winter solstice. Note how all the windows are in the shade.

Brise soleil, sometimes brise-soleil (French: [bʁiz sɔlɛj]; lit. 'sun breaker'), is an architectural feature of a building that reduces its heat gain by deflecting incoming sunlight. The system allows low-level sunlight to enter a building in the mornings, evenings and during winter but cuts out direct light during summer.

== Types ==
Brise-soleil can comprise a variety of permanent sun-shading structures, ranging from the simple patterned concrete walls popularized by Le Corbusier in the Palace of Assembly to the elaborate wing-like mechanism devised by Santiago Calatrava for the Milwaukee Art Museum or the mechanical, pattern-creating devices of the Institut du Monde Arabe by Jean Nouvel.

In the typical form, a horizontal projection extends from the sunside facade of a building. This is most commonly used to prevent facades with a large amount of glass from overheating during the summer. Often louvers are incorporated into the shade to prevent the high-angle summer sun falling on the facade, but also to allow the low-angle winter sun to provide some passive solar heating.

== Gallery ==
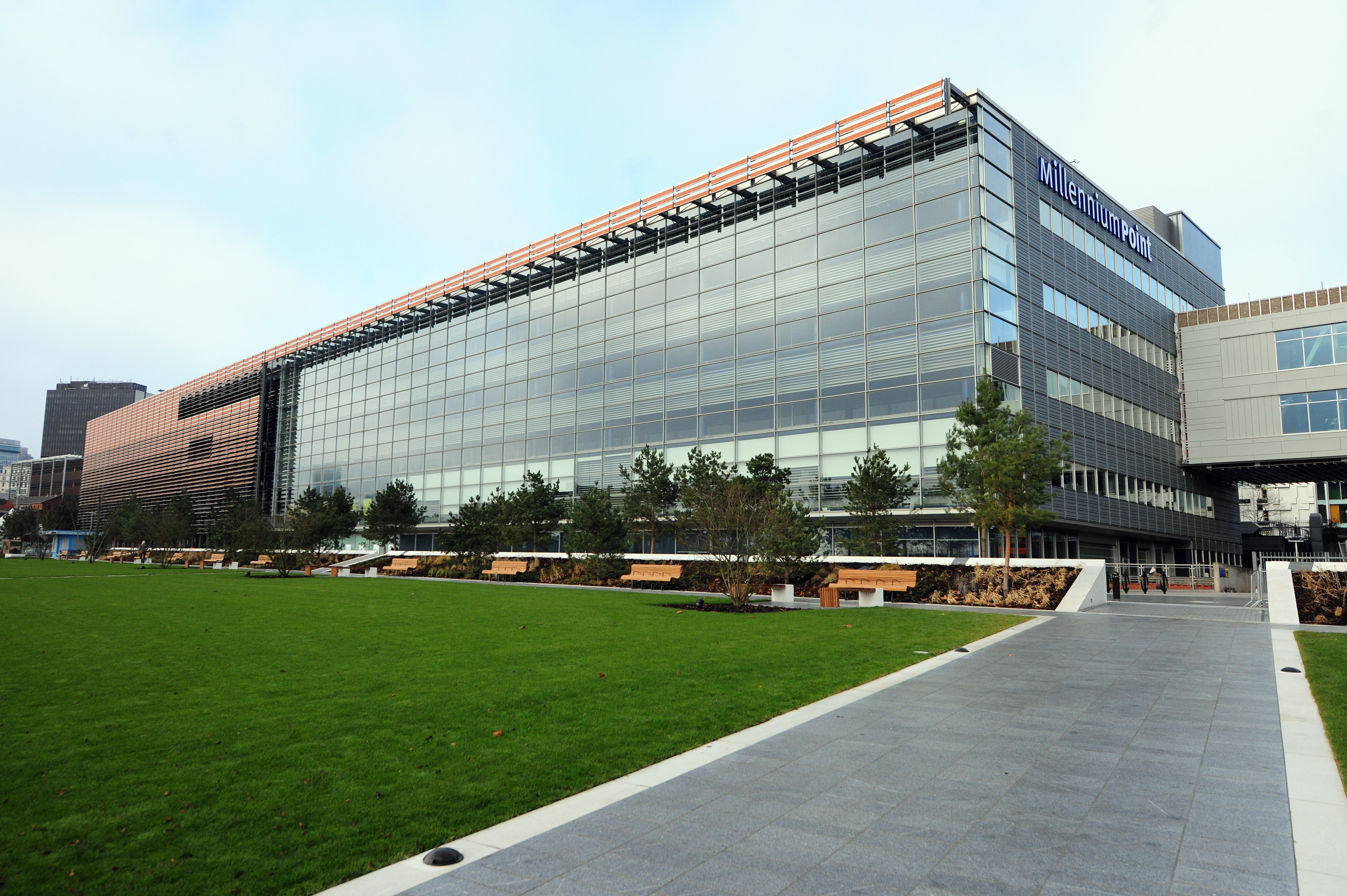
Millennium Point, Birmingham, UK: Half of the facade has exterior blinds

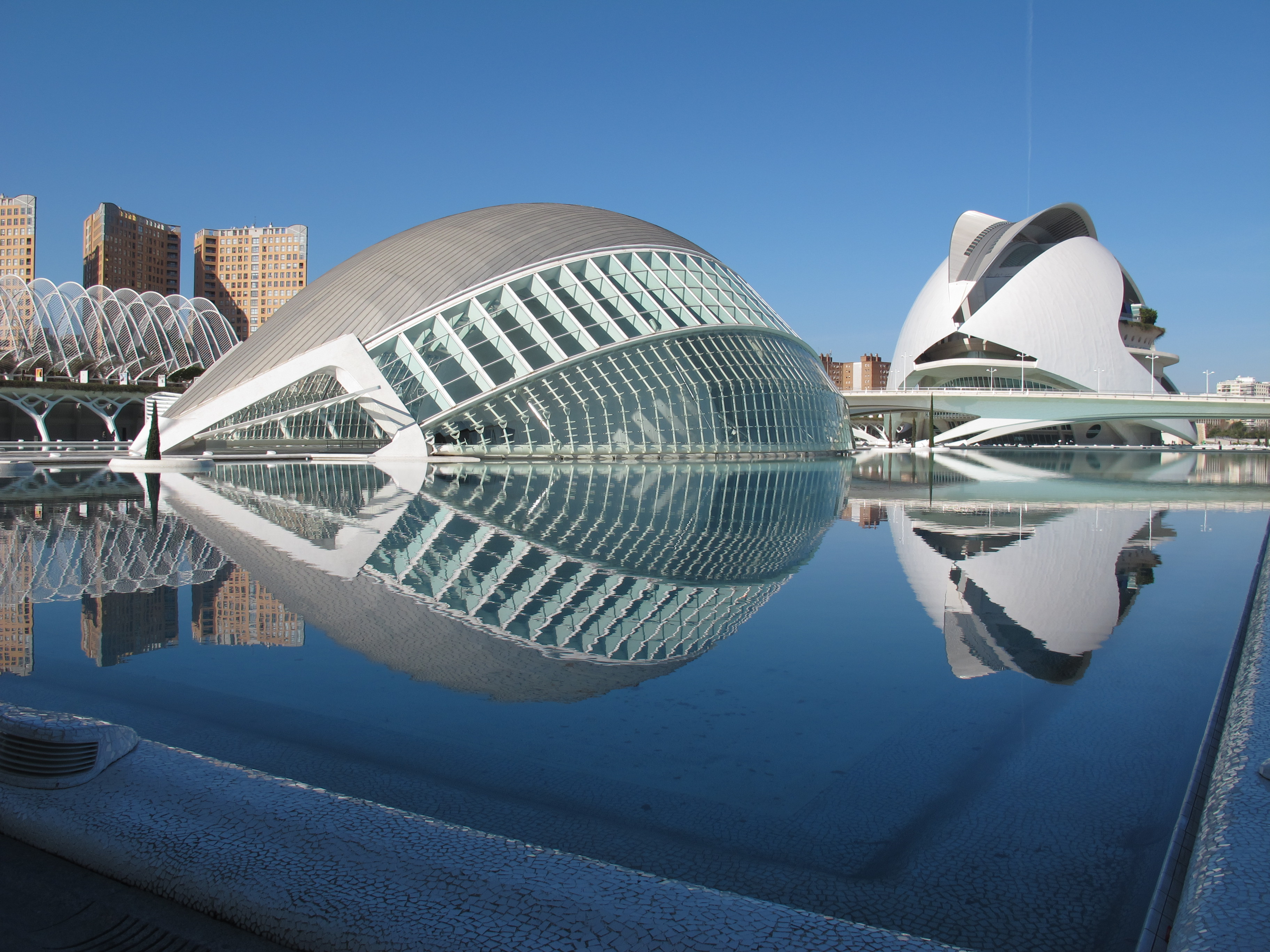
City of Arts and Sciences, Valencia: brise soleil at the L'Hemisfèric

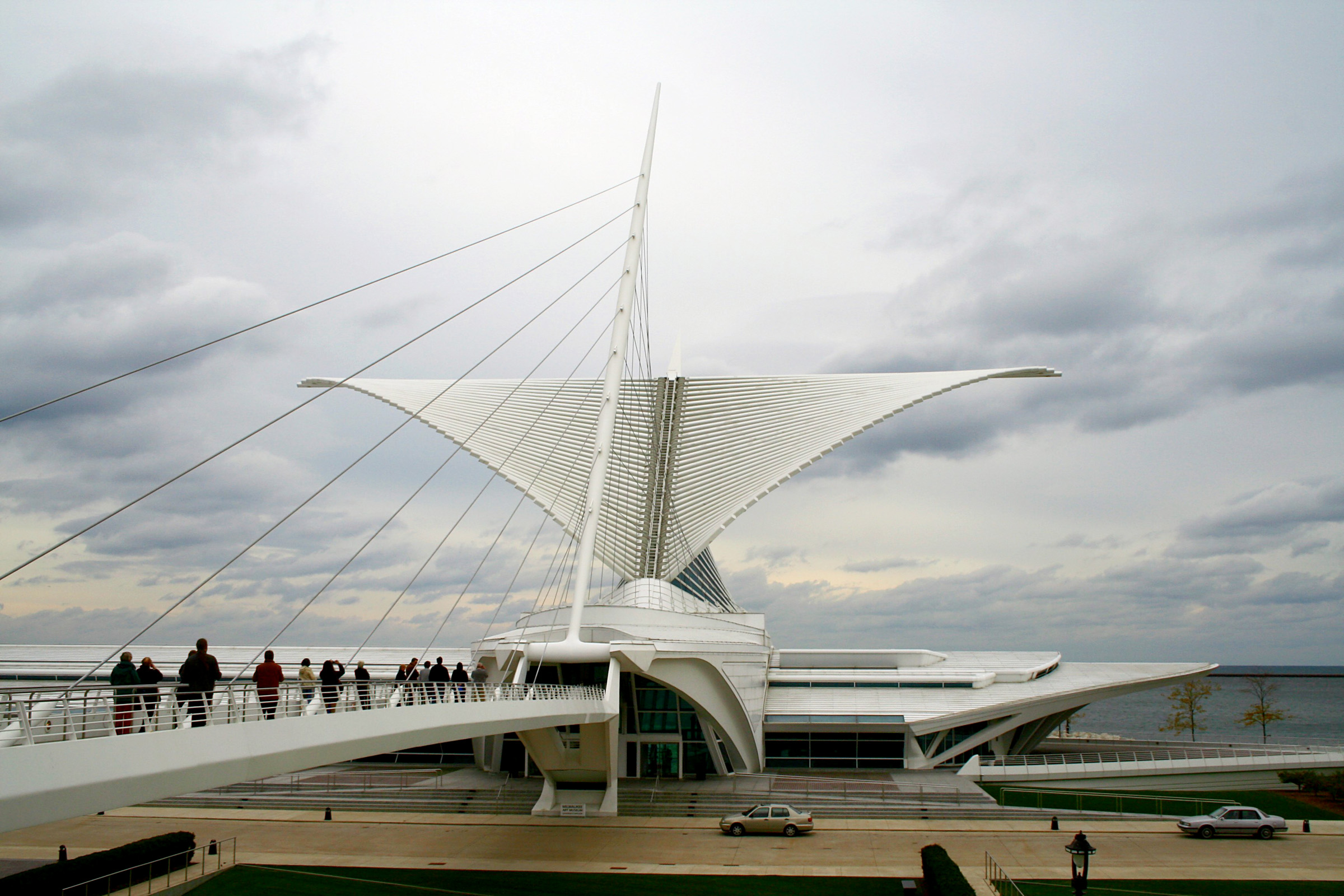
The movable Burke brise soleil on the Quadracci Pavilion of the Milwaukee Art Museum closes at sunset.

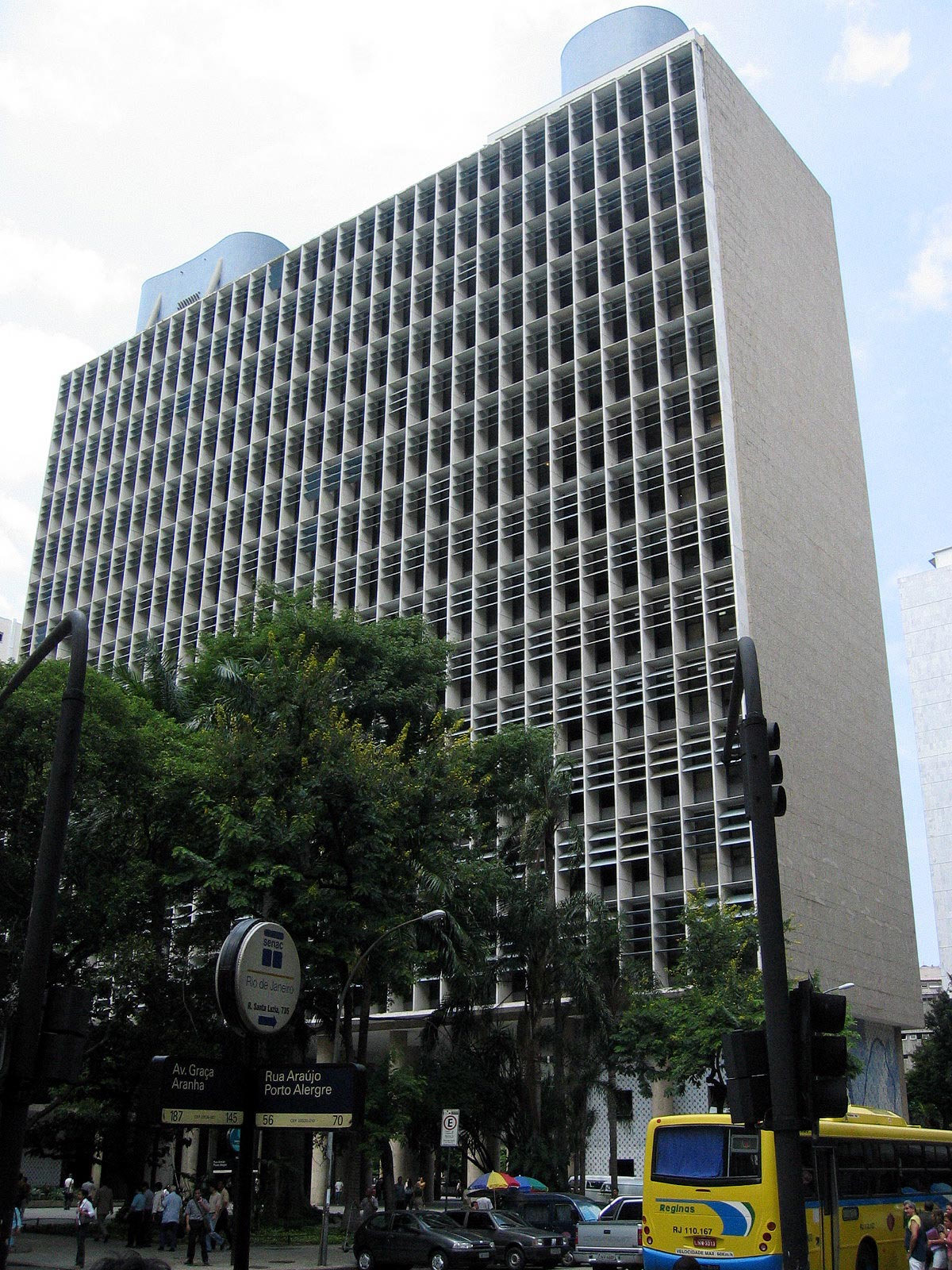
Gustavo Capanema Palace in Rio de Janeiro

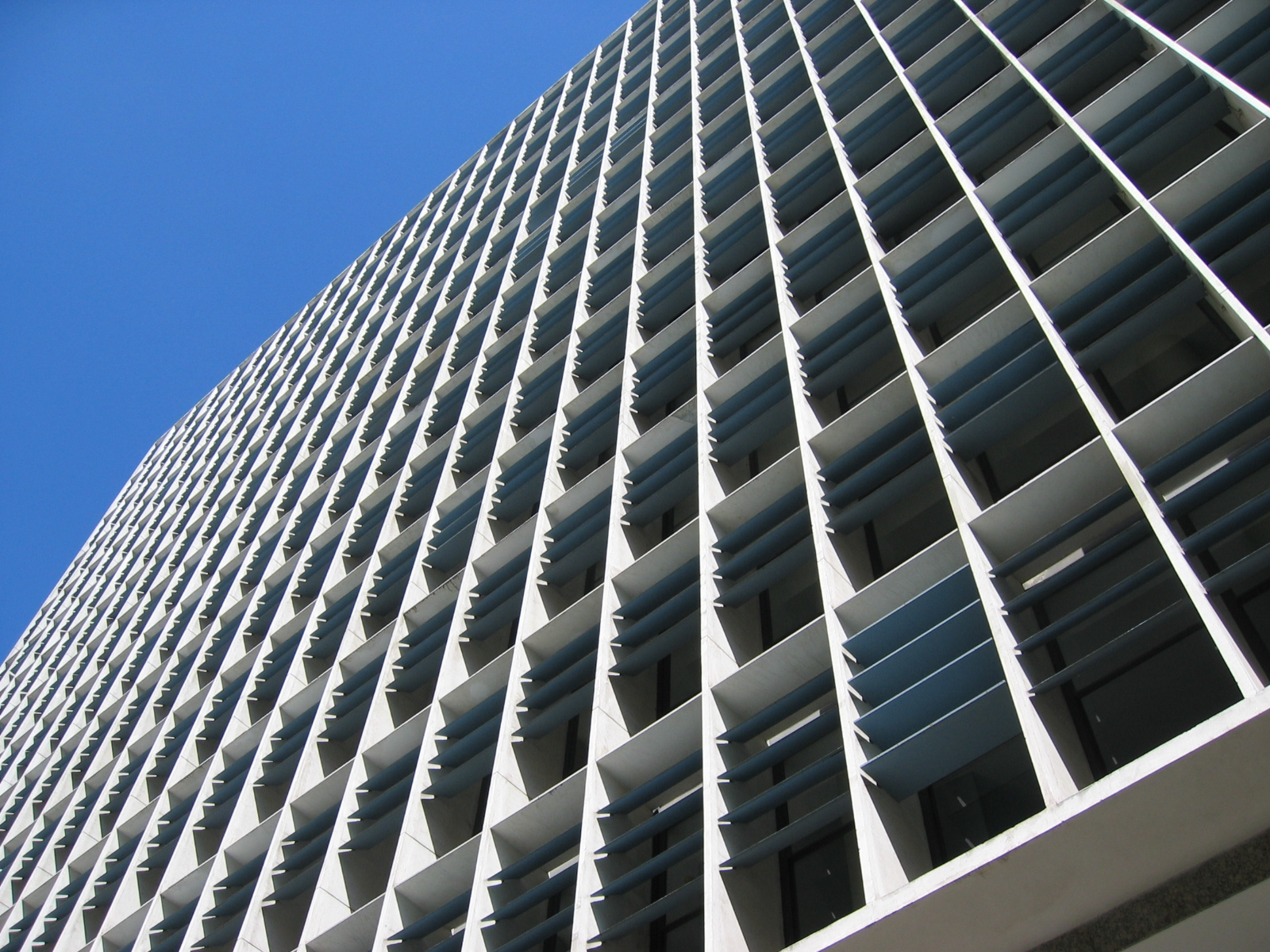
Detail of north facade of Gustavo Capanema Palace

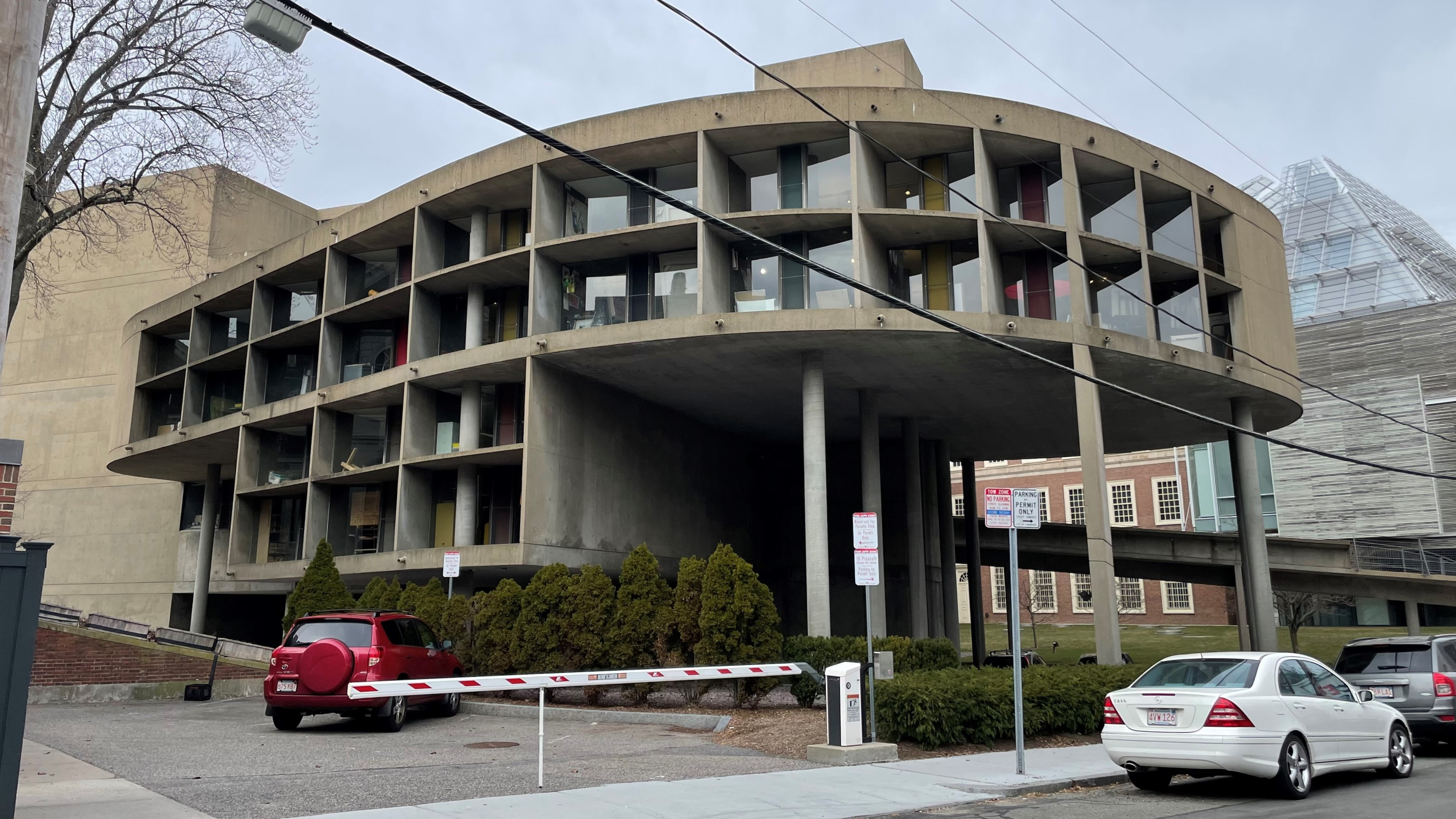
The Carpenter Center for the Visual Arts

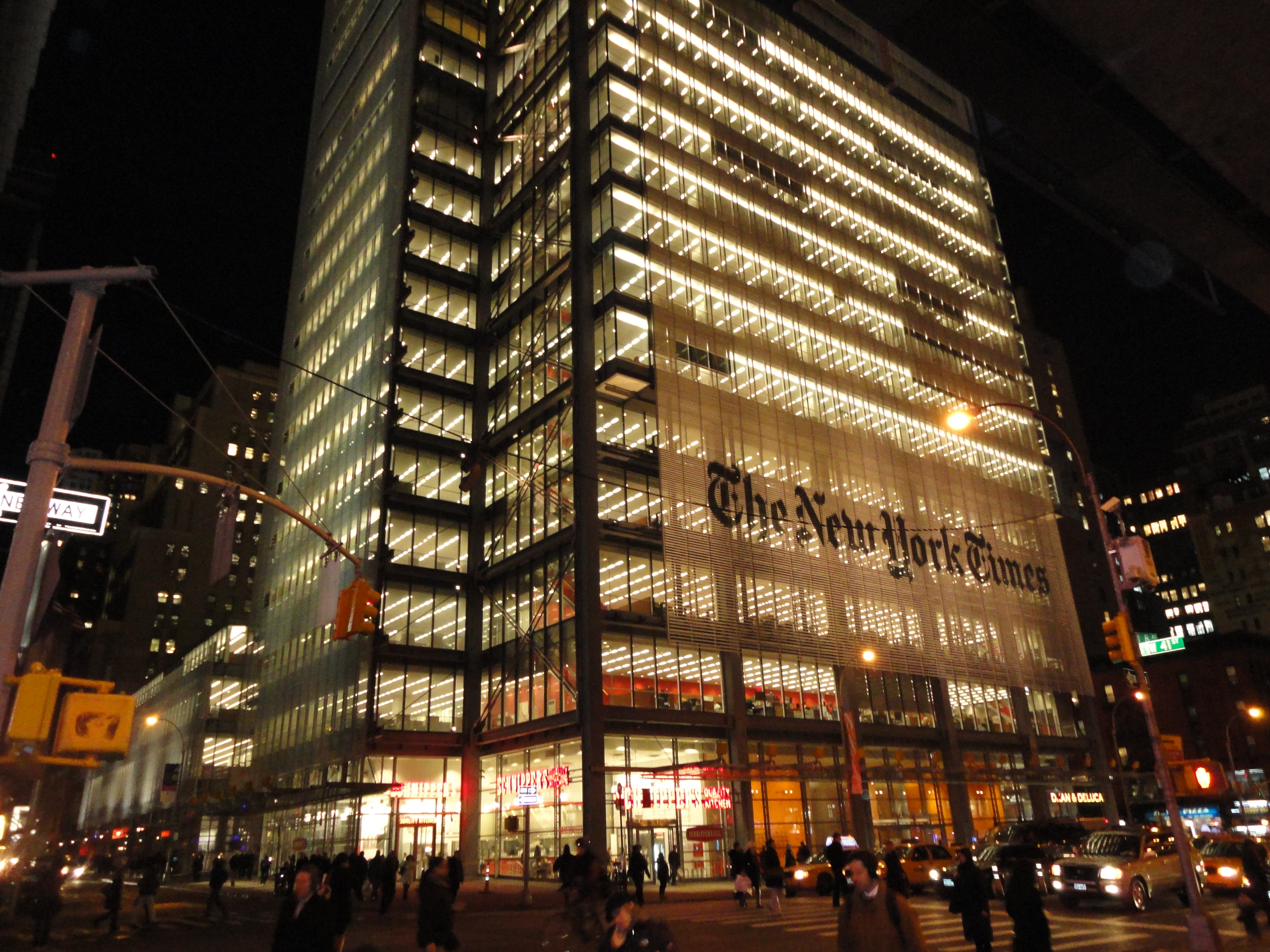
The New York Times Building by Renzo Piano

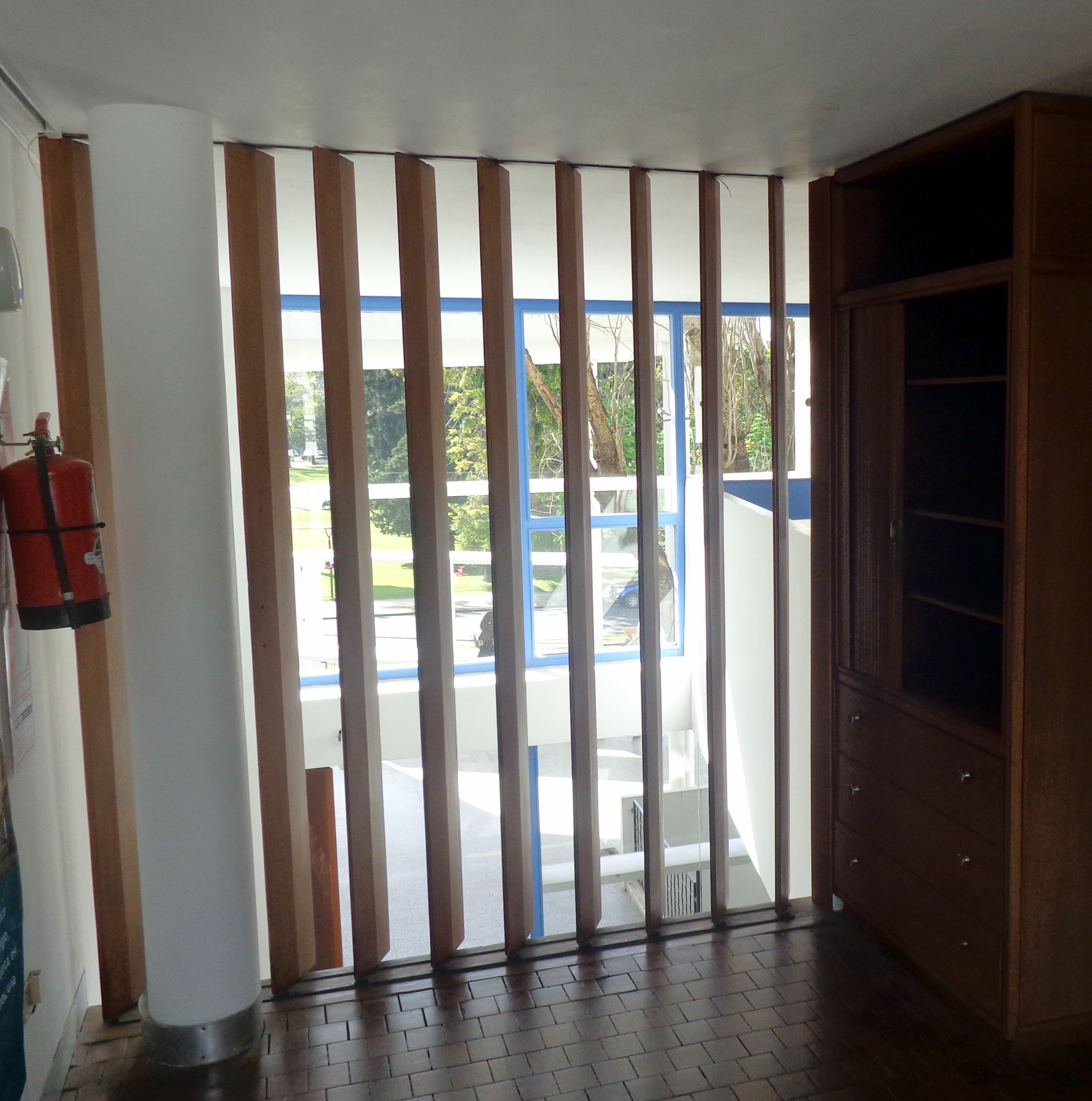
Curutchet House by Le Corbusier, inside view

== See also ==
- Awning
- Green building
- List of low-energy building techniques
- Mashrabiya, a type of latticework covered balcony or window in Islamic architecture
- Pergola
- Sudare
