= Cité de Refuge =

Building in Paris, France

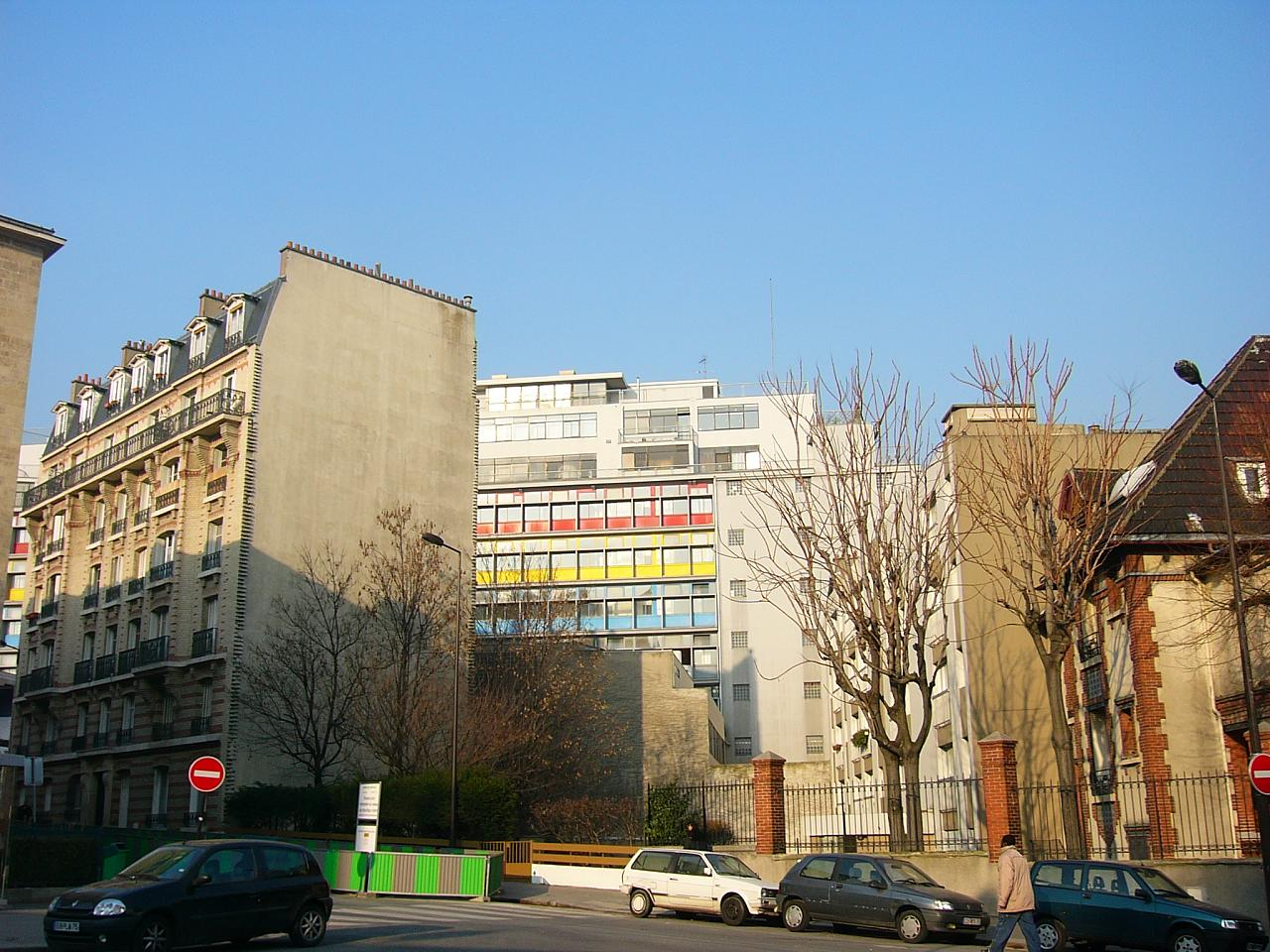
- Partial view of the facade, post 1952.
- Interactive map of the Cité de Refuge area

General information
- Architectural style: Modernist, International
- Location: Île-de-France, 12 rue Cantagrel, Paris
- Coordinates: 48.826667°N 2.376667°E
- Current tenants: Salvation Army
- Construction started: 1929
- Completed: 1933

Design and construction
- Architect: Le Corbusier

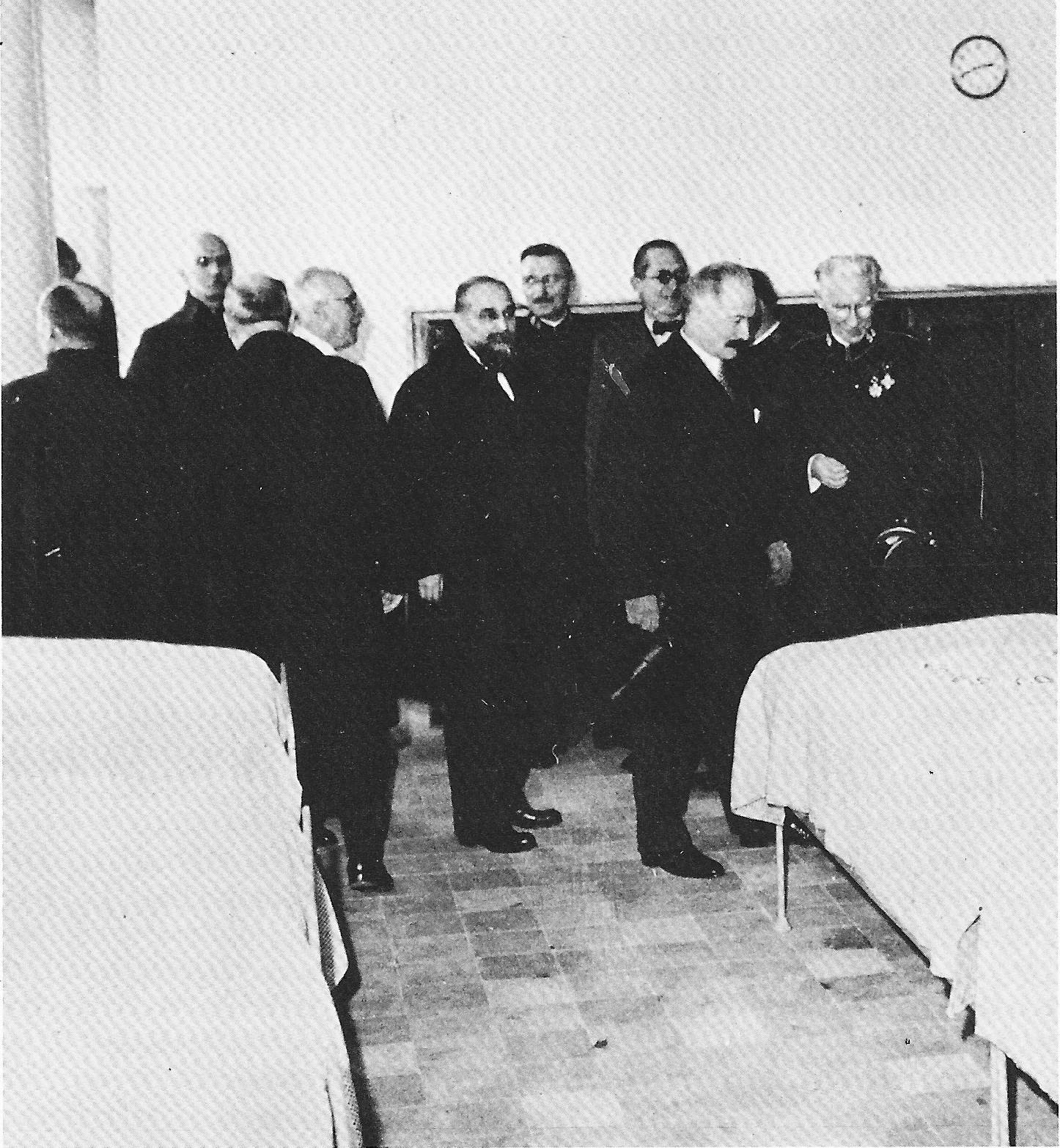
Albin Peyron (at left) with the President of the République Albert Lebrun (2nd left) and the architect Le Corbusier (3rd right) in 1933 during the inauguration of "la Cité de refuge” at 12 rue Cantagrel, Paris

La Cité de Refuge is a building in Paris, France designed by the architect Le Corbusier. It was designed for the Salvation Army and opened in 1933. Since that time it has been occupied by the French Salvation Army. The building, one of Le Corbusier's first urban housing projects, was designated a National Historical Monument of France in 1975.

== History ==
La Cité de Refuge was Le Corbusier's third building for the Salvation Army. It was built between 1929 and 1933 on 12 rue Cantagrel in the 13th arrondissement of Paris. The first design meeting occurred in May 1929, and the cornerstone was laid in June 1930.

This was the most ambitious and complex building to be designed and erected by Le Corbusier at this early stage of his career. In order to register for the night, would-be clients of the Salvation Army have to pass through what Kenneth Frampton describes as a "'Still Life' assembly of Platonic forms," which "affords the possibility of a rite of passage."

The building consists of a single long slab block containing cellular accommodation at an angle to Rue de Cantagrel fronted by the free standing sculptural elements containing communal facilities such as reception hall, dining room, and administrative offices.

The facade of the building was problematic from the beginning. It was designed to be a sealed 10,000 sq.ft glass facade with forced air ventilation. The system never worked correctly and was difficult to control. The facade was severely damaged by bombing during World War II. One bomb in particular, dropped August 25, 1944 in front of the building by the Germans, shattered all of its glass facade. Pierre Jeanneret oversaw repairs to the facade, the addition of a brise soleil between 1948 and 1952 and the replacement of the windows to the roof pavilions.

The building was partially restored in 1975.

Cité de Refuge in 2019

The building underwent extensive renovations beginning in 2007, with the work completed in 2016.
