= Le Corbusier's Architectural Polychromy =

Color system developed by Le Corbusier

Le Corbusier’s Palette or Le Corbusier's Architectural Polychromy is a color scheme created by the Swiss-French architect Le Corbusier in 1931 and 1959 for use in architecture and interior design. This palette includes 63 carefully selected colors based on principles of spatial perception, light, and harmony.

== History ==
Le Corbusier paid great attention to color in architecture and its impact on human perception. He believed that color could shape space by creating depth, light effects, and emotional states. Le Corbusier considered color essential for evoking emotions and creating spatial illusions. His color theory was published in 1931. In it, he introduced his concept and a carefully selected palette of 43 colors intended for specific architectural contexts, and in 1959, he expanded it with 20 new shades, bringing the total number of colors to 63.

== Structure of the Palette ==
Le Corbusier’s palette is based on principles of harmonious color combinations and their impact on spatial perception.

=== 1931 Palette ===
The first version of the palette consisted of 43 colors, grouped by functional purpose:

- Neutral and natural shades — gray, beige, and sandy colors creating a calm background.
- Earthy tones — ochre, terracotta, and brown, resembling natural materials.
- Bright accent colors — intense red, blue, and green shades used for dynamic effects.

=== 1959 Palette ===
The second version was expanded to 63 colors. The new shades included:

- Deep and rich colors — dark blue, burgundy, and deep green.
- Shades enhancing light effects — brighter variations of yellow and orange.
- Additional gray and pastel tones for architectural solutions.

== Principles of Use ==
Le Corbusier developed three main principles for using his color palette:

1. Creating atmosphere — color choice should correspond to the function of the space (e.g., calm tones for relaxation, active tones for work).
2. Harmony and contrast — neutral colors combined with bright accents.
3. Optical effects — light colors expand space, while dark colors create depth and focus.

== Influence on Architecture ==
Le Corbusier’s palette found widespread application in architecture and interior design. It was used in projects such as "Unité d’Habitation," "Villa Savoye," and other iconic buildings. Architects and designers continue to use his color schemes due to their versatility and aesthetic appeal.

== Modern Applications ==
Today, Le Corbusier’s palette remains relevant. The company "Les Couleurs Le Corbusier" produces paints and finishing materials that match the architect’s original color solutions. These colors are actively used in contemporary residential and commercial projects.

== See also ==
- Le Corbusier
- Functionalism (architecture)
