= Villa Baizeau =

1928 villa by Le Corbusier in Carthage

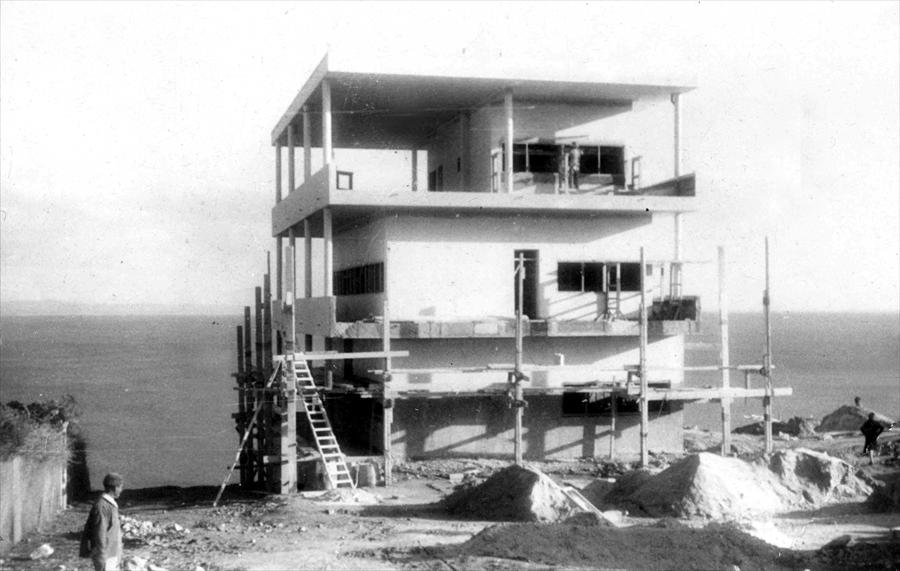

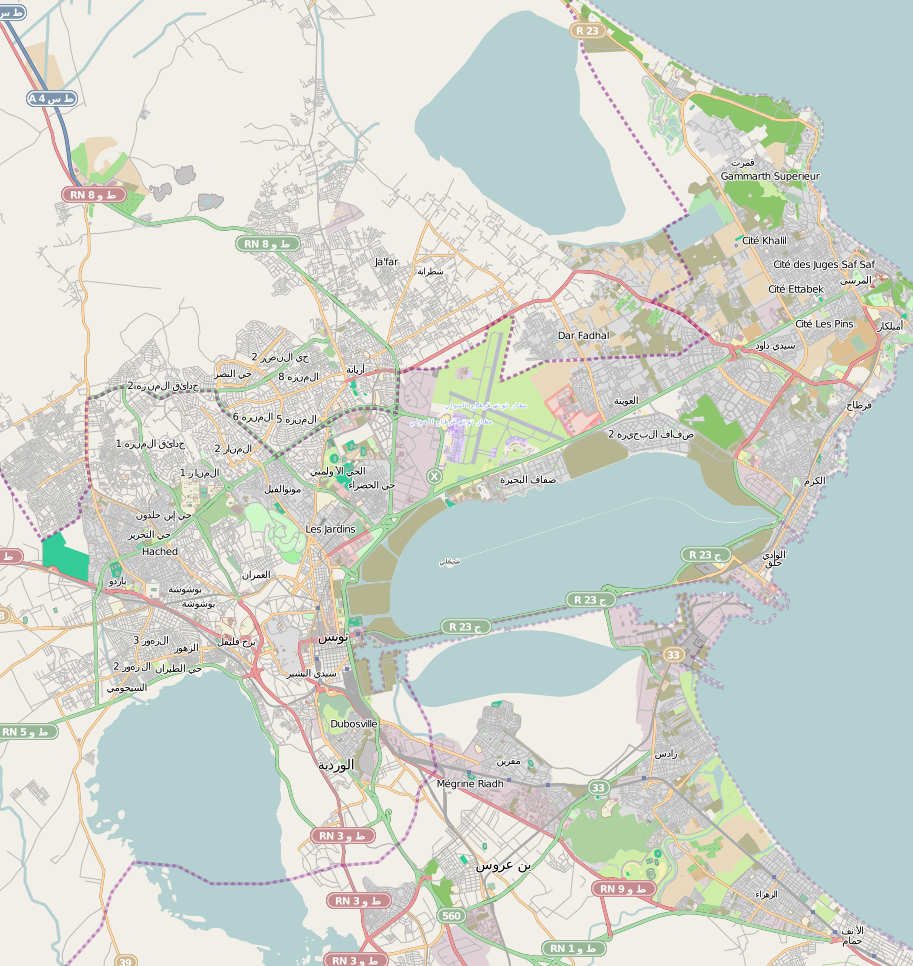
- Location within Greater Tunis

General information
- Coordinates: 36.85825°N 10.33908°E
- Groundbreaking: 1930
- Construction started: 1928

Villa Baizeau is a residential home in the Carthage Palace, Tunis, Tunisia designed by Swiss modernist architect Le Corbusier in 1928. The building is the only work in Tunisia by the architect.

Le Corbusier designed the entire project remotely; neither he nor any member of his staff visited the site before, during, or following construction of the building.
