= Maison Planeix =

House by Le Corbusier in Paris

Coordinates: 48°49′24″N 2°22′26″E

- Interactive map of the Maison Planeix area

General information
- Location: France, 24bis - 26bis boulevard Masséna, Paris
- Completed: 1928
- Owner: Antonin Planeix

Design and construction
- Architect: Le Corbusier

Maison Planeix is a villa located in the 13th arrondissement of Paris, France. It was designed by Le Corbusier and Pierre Jeanneret for the sculptor Antonin Planeix. It was completed in 1928. In 1976 it was listed as a monument historique.
