= Avenida Figueroa Alcorta =

Street in Buenos Aires, Argentina

Coordinates: 34.58103°S 58.39737°W

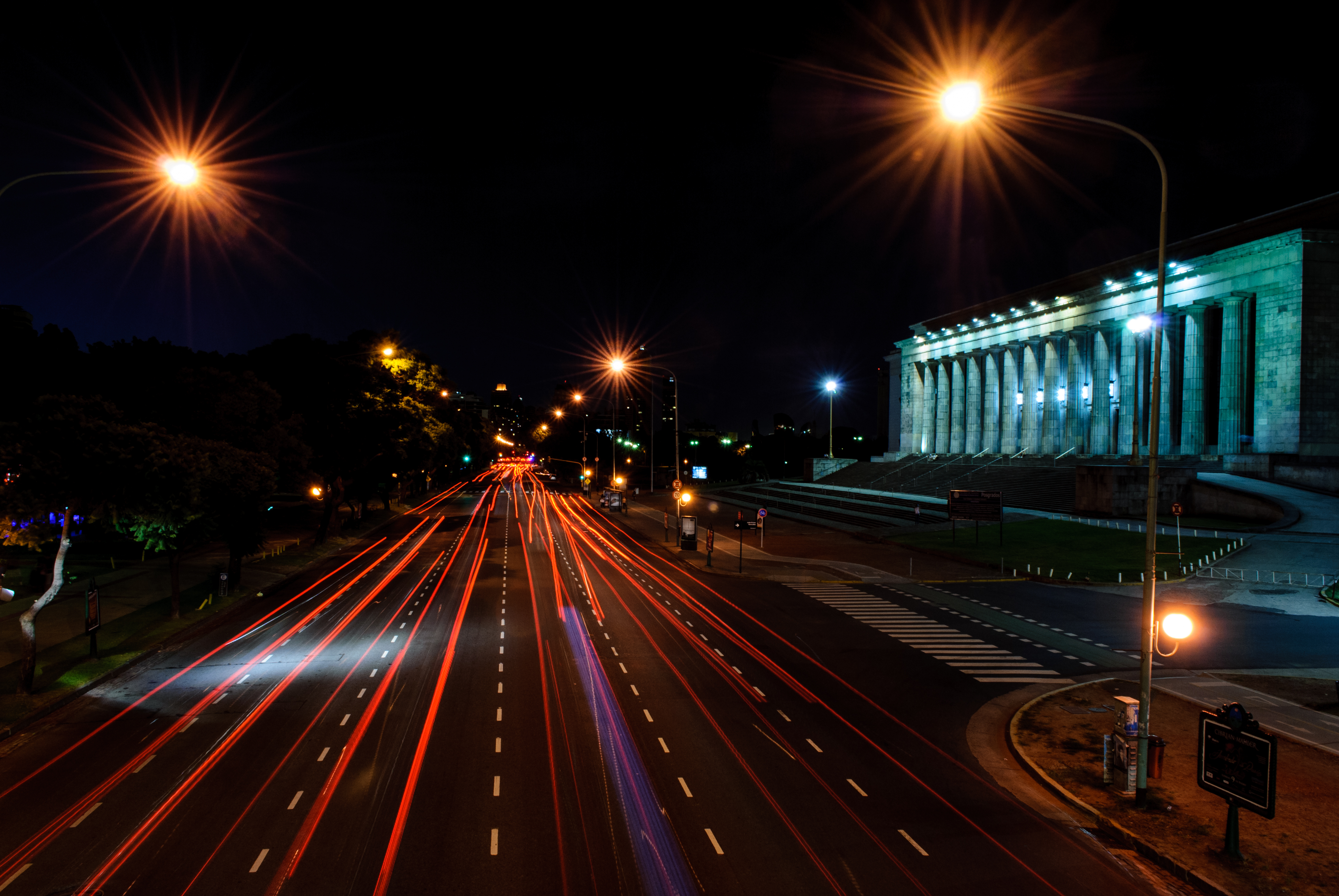
Night shot of Figueroa Alcorta Avenue with the UBA Faculty of Law to the right

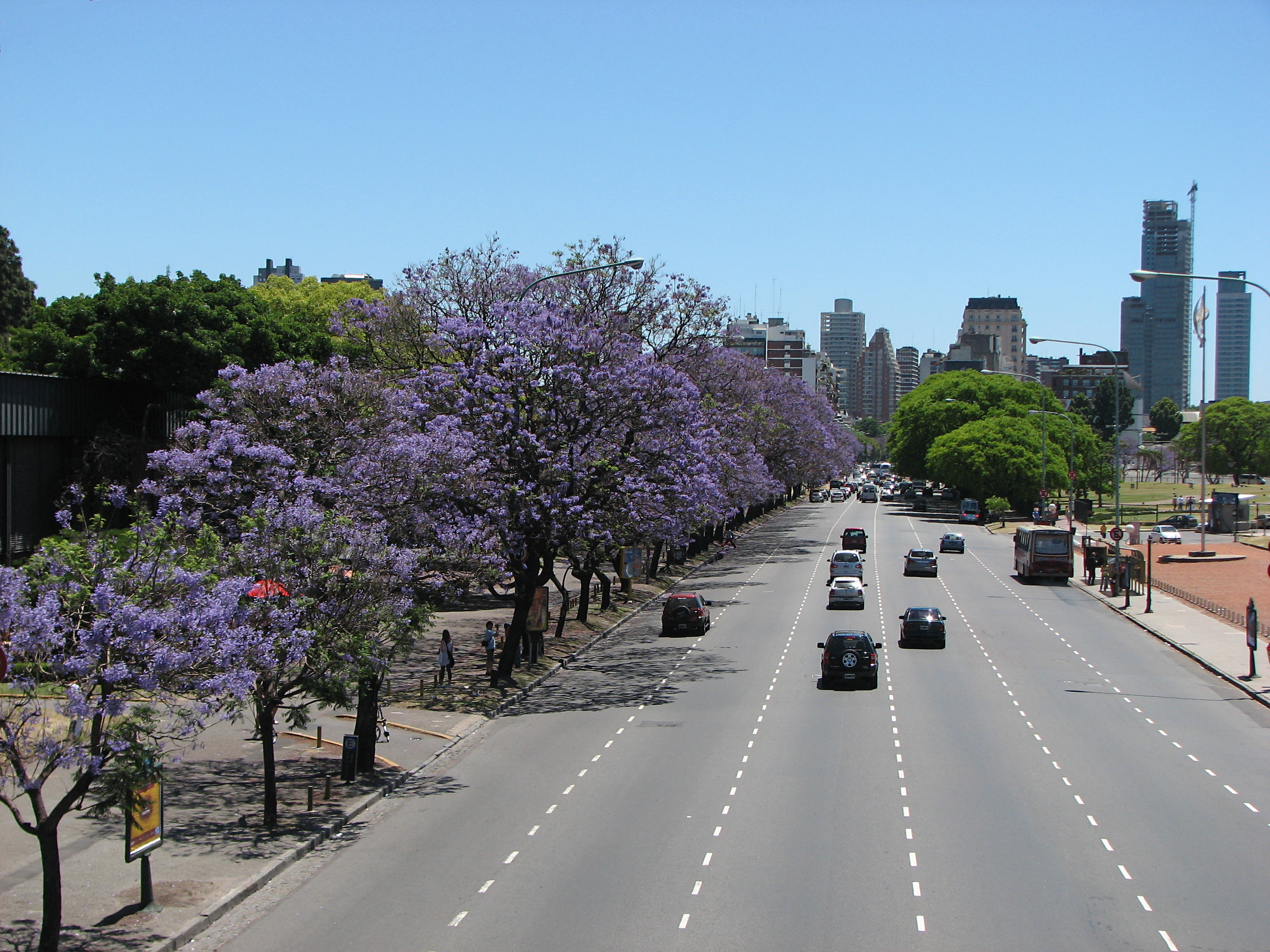
The avenue on its route towards the Barrio Parque area.

Avenida Figueroa Alcorta is a major thoroughfare street in Buenos Aires, Argentina, with a length of over 7 km (4.3 mi) along the city's northside.

== History ==
The rapid northward growth of the city of Buenos Aires during the late nineteenth century was facilitated by plans for a number of boulevards in the area by Mayor Torcuato de Alvear. Shortly after the opening of Viceroy Vértiz Avenue (today Avenida del Libertador) in 1906, a parallel boulevard was begun to serve the numerous upscale neighborhoods planned for the largely undeveloped northside.

Planned with the assistance of French Argentine urbanist Carlos Thays and around his recent remodeling of Parque Tres de Febrero, the thoroughfare was opened on the 1910 centennial of the May Revolution that led to independence and was, accordingly, named Avenida Centenario. Thays also designed a new residential neighborhood anchored around the new avenue: Barrio Parque, opened for development in 1912. The Sanitation Works Commission's massive water reclamation plant was subsequently built along the avenue's northern stretch.

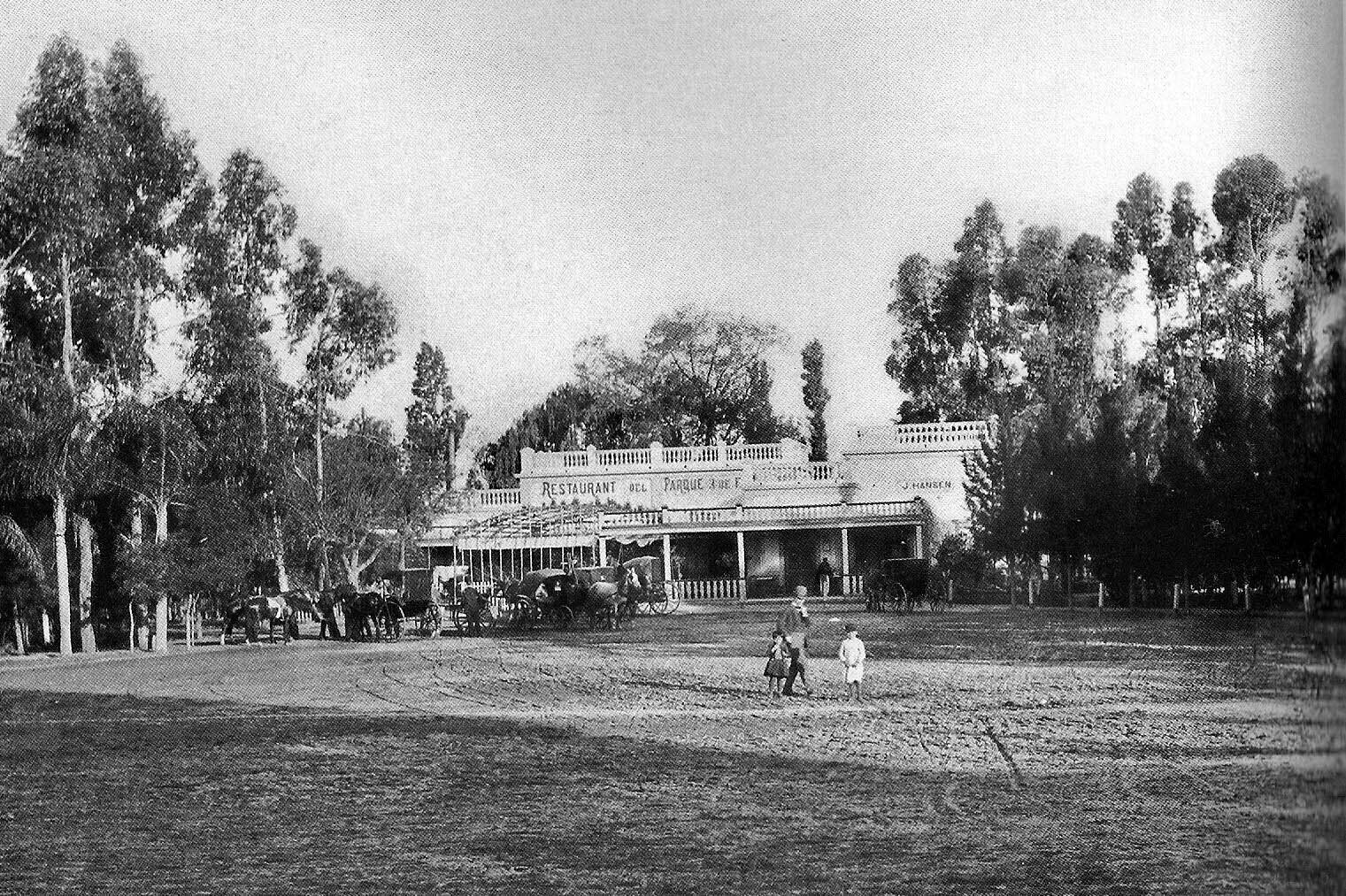
Excavations along the avenue in 2008 uncovered remains of the former Hansen's Café.

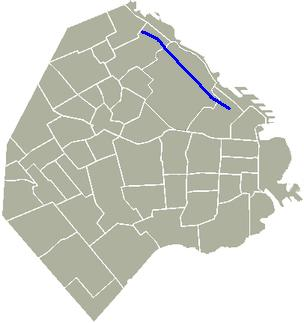
Location of Avenida Figueroa Alcorta in Buenos Aires.

Chrysler Motors opened an assembly plant on the avenue in 1932 (since demolished), an investment complemented by a testing facility housed in an ornate structure north of Barrio Parque (the former facility today houses condominiums and an automobile museum). The northern end of the avenue became home to the River Plate Football Club's monumental stadium, finished in 1938. The avenue was later graced by tennis and country clubs, parks and a number of monumental public buildings, though its boulevard medians were removed around 1970 to accommodate growing traffic. Excavations along the avenue in 2008 uncovered remains of the former Hansen's Café, among the city's first and most popular tango redoubts until its demolition in 1912.

== Itinerary ==
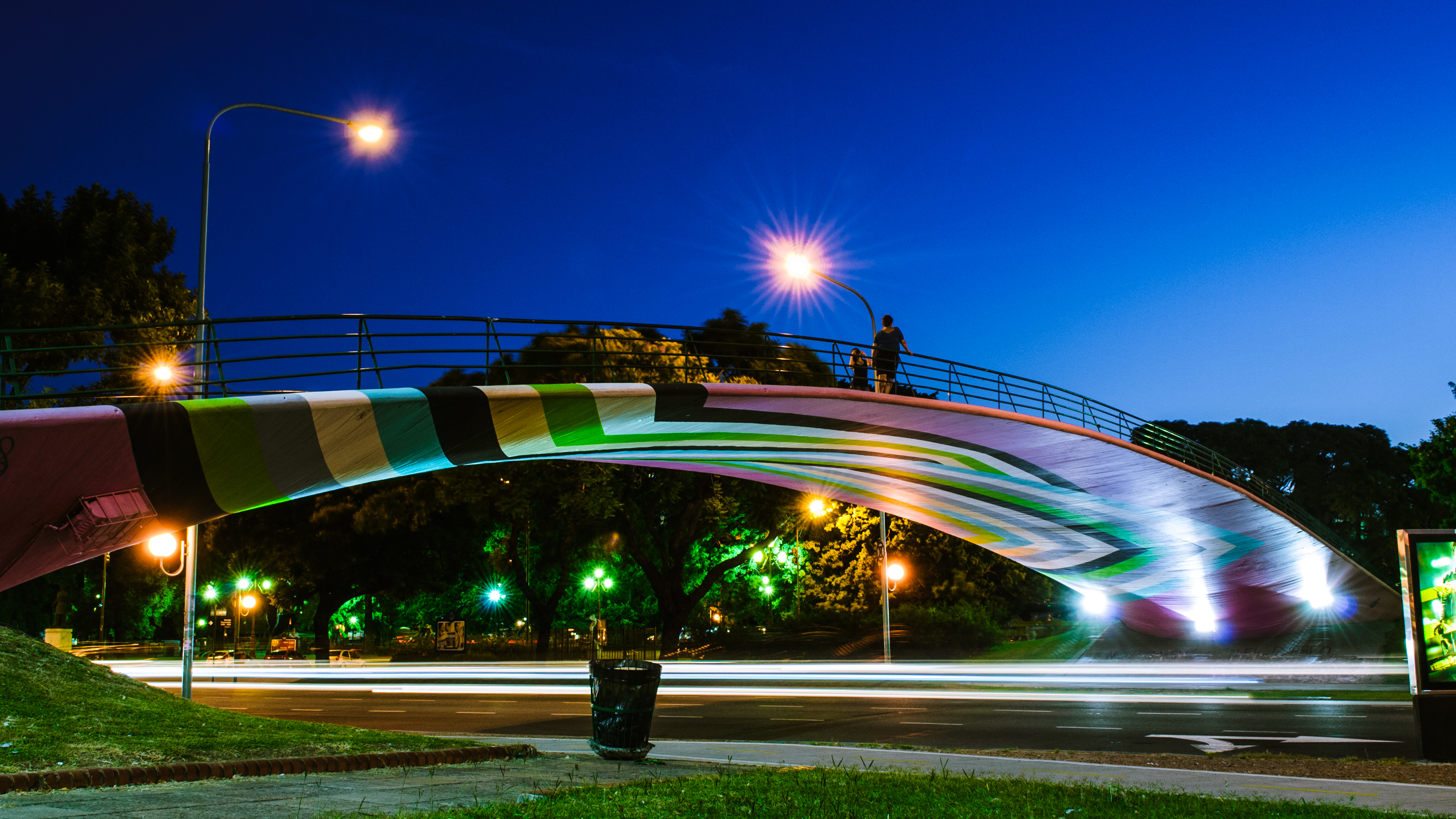
Bridge over Figueroa Alcorta Avenue (2013)

A one way thoroughfare, the avenue begins at its eastern end past the Buenos Aires Palais de Glace in the upscale Recoleta section. Passing by the University of Buenos Aires Faculty of Law, the monumental Neoclassic structure dating from the administration of President Juan Perón (who had it built in the early 1950s as the future headquarters of the CGT, Argentina's largest labor union), the avenue also travels behind the National Fine Arts Museum and past United Nations Plaza. There, architect Eduardo Catalano installed the iconic Floralis Genérica in 2001. Past UN Plaza, the avenue passes by Argentine Public Television Studios, an extensive Modernist structure opened in 1978 and known locally for its roof garden. The studios are visually complemented by the reflecting pools in Rubén Darío Plaza and by the Chilean Embassy, a smaller, modernist building built in 1969. Behind the adjoining Chile Plaza, the San Martín National Institute and monument to José de San Martín anchor the leafy Barrio Parque neighborhood. The Institute is housed in a 1946 replica of the Liberator's Boulogne-sur-Mer residence in his later years. Along the other side of the avenue, businessman Eduardo Constantini opened his Latin American Art Museum of Buenos Aires (MALBA) in 2001.

Passing by the Buenos Aires Japanese Gardens in the Palermo section of the city, the avenue leaves its residential surroundings, traveling through parks and other public areas for the remaining stretches. Cutting through urbanist Carlos Thays' vast Parque Tres de Febrero, it affords a view of his extensive rose garden and of the Galileo Galilei planetarium, opened in 1966. The intersection with Sarmiento Avenue features Renzo Baldi and Héctor Rocha's Monument to General Justo José de Urquiza. Passing by the Buenos Aires Lawn Tennis Club, the City Velodrome and the Regata Lake, it enters the Belgrano neighborhood, where it ends at Guillermo Udaondo Avenue, past the River Plate football stadium.

== Gallery ==
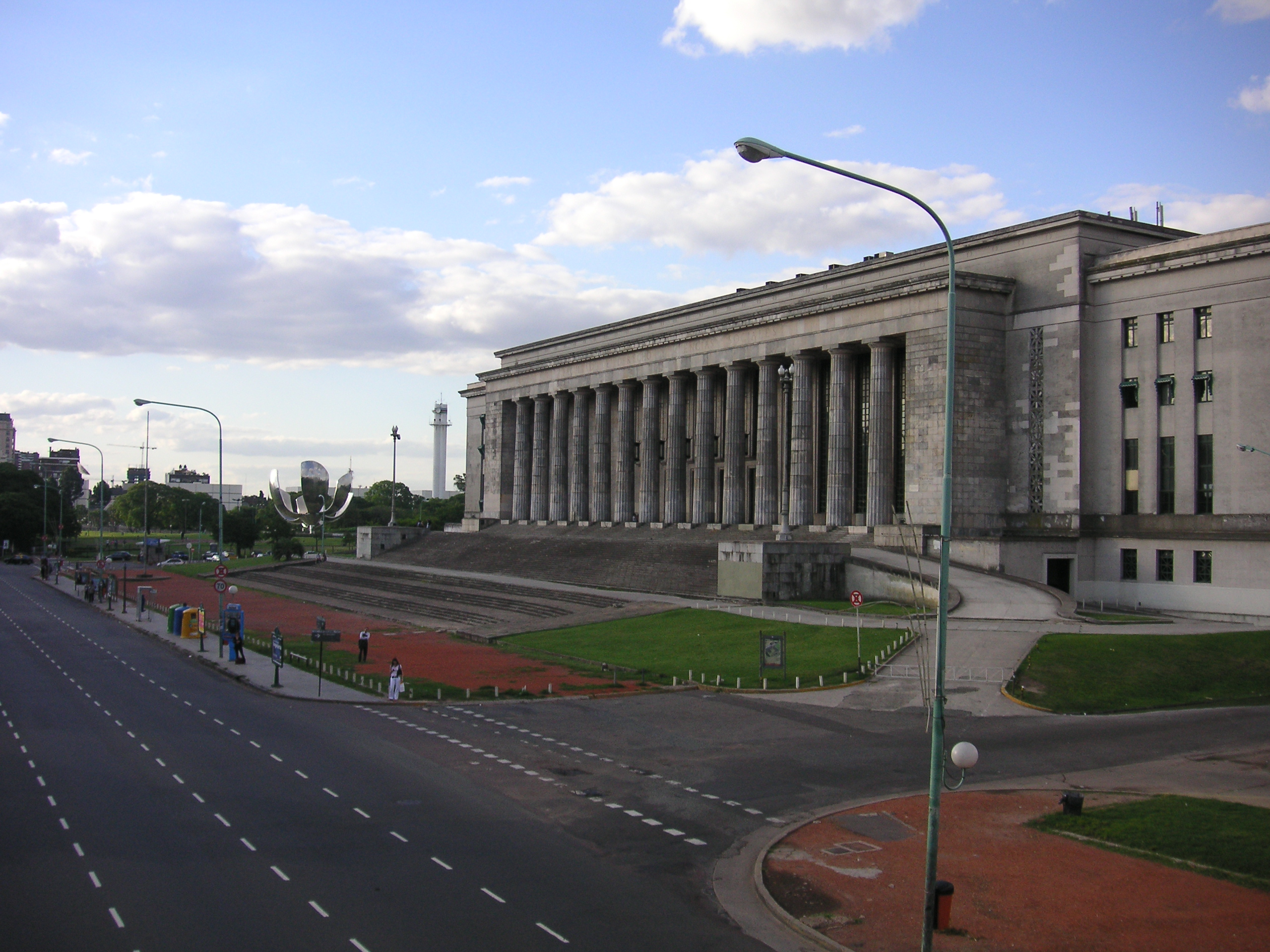
The University of Buenos Aires Faculty of Law, Floralis Genérica in background.

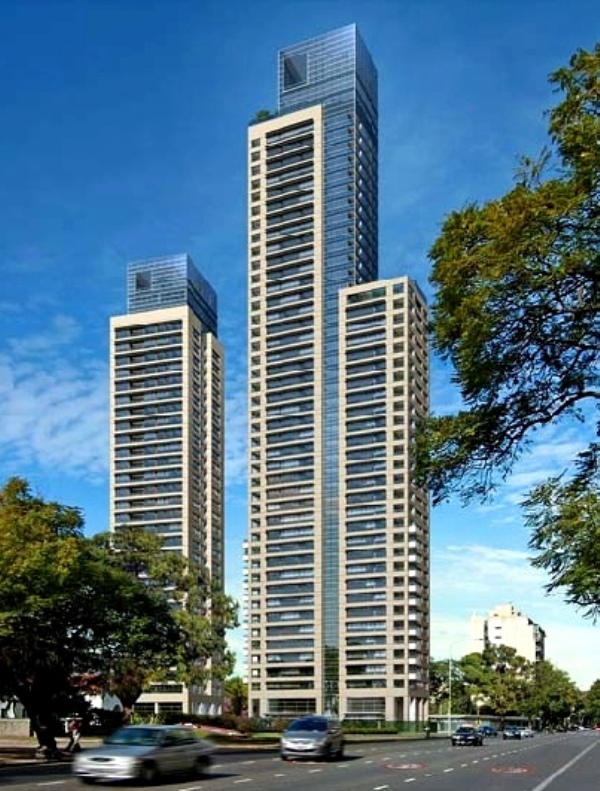
The Le Parc Figueroa Alcorta condominium towers.

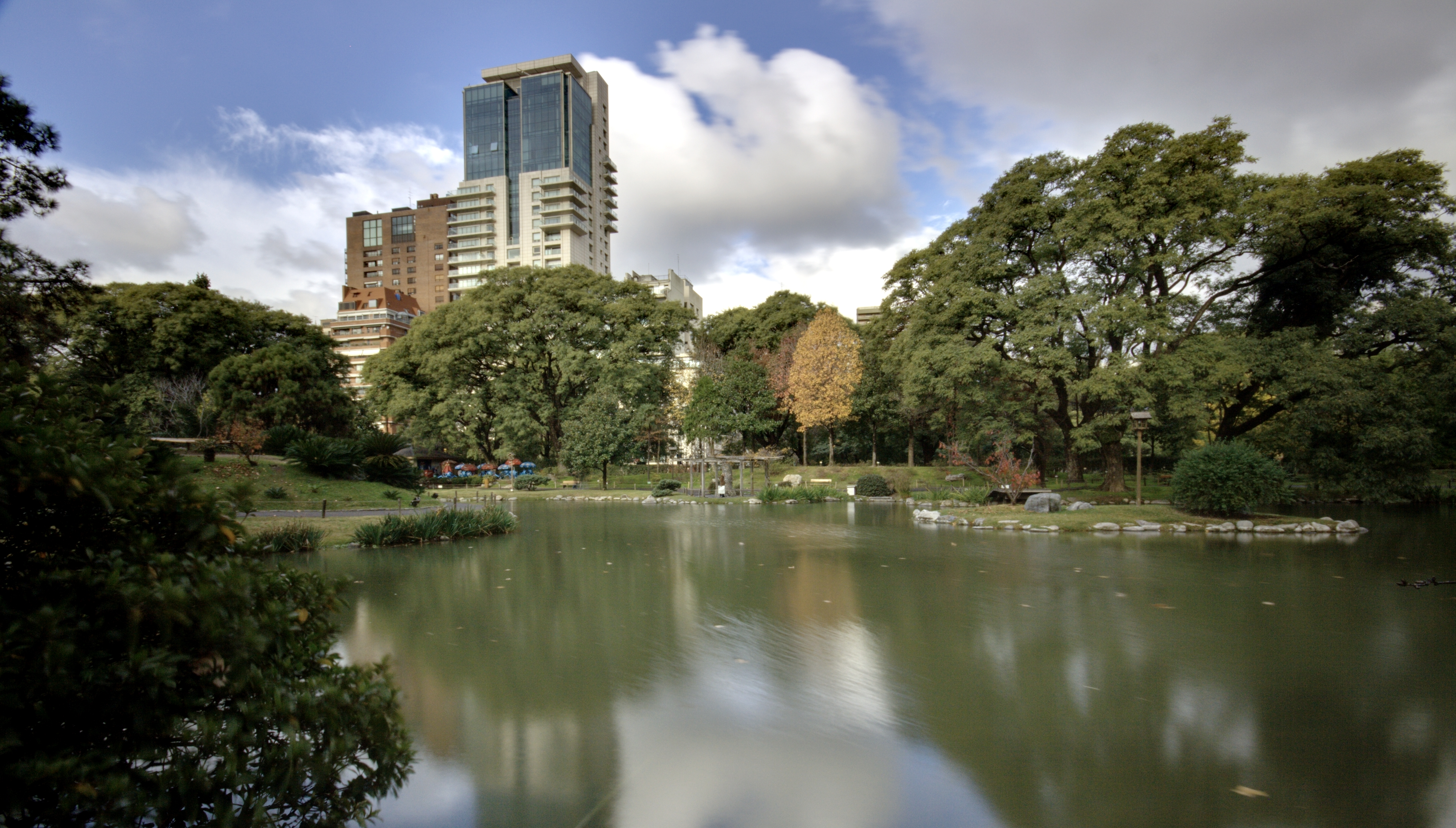
The Japanese Gardens and architecture overlooking the avenue.

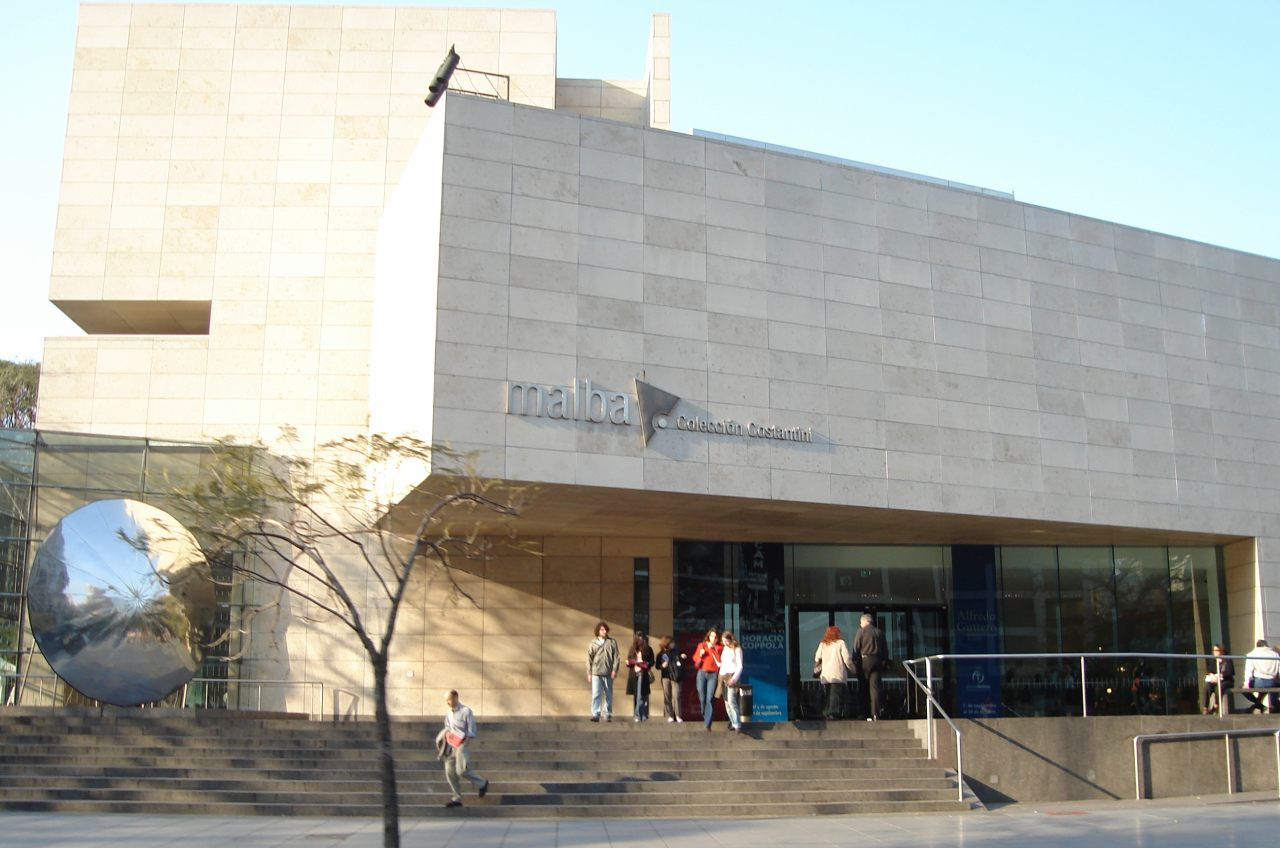
The Latin American Art Museum of Buenos Aires (MALBA).

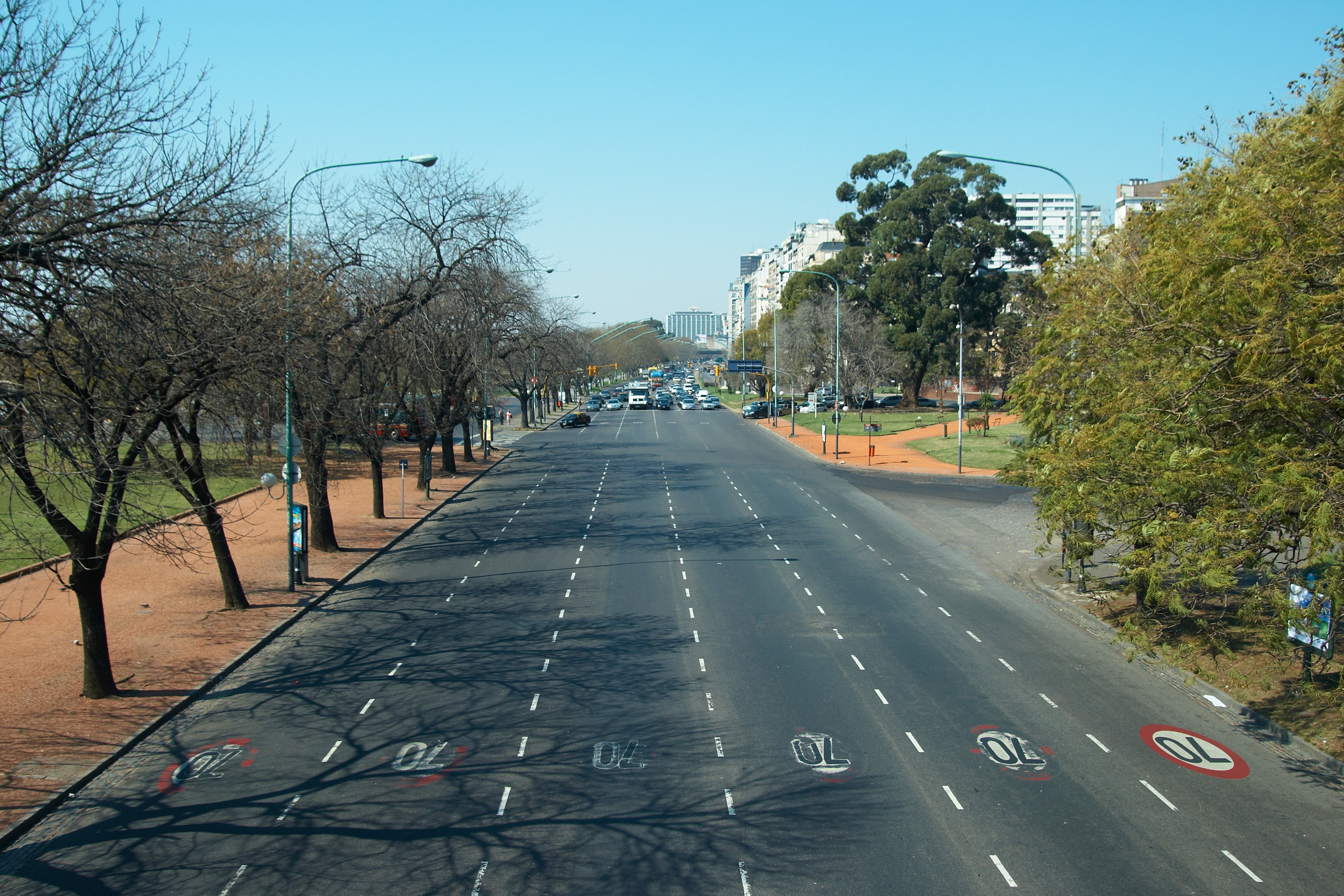
Cars on Avenida Figueroa Alcorta during noon.
