= Space (architecture) =

Design element in architecture

Space is one of the elements of design of architecture, as space is continuously studied for its usage. Architectural designs are created by carving space out of space, creating space out of space, and designing spaces by dividing this space using various tools, such as geometry, colours, and shapes. Architectural space is a portion of the surrounding world artificially isolated through architectural means. Space is the primary object of an architect's artistic work.

With the development of architecture, the concept of architectural space has undergone significant changes. If in medieval architecture the basis of spatial work was the observance of a certain order in the arrangement of buildings and their proportions, in the Renaissance era the idea of "visibility" emerged; an important aspect of spatial organization became the arrangement of structures so as to offer the best possible view. In the Modern Era, architects began to give great importance to the organization of large architectural spaces under integrated urban planning and axial composition. In the 20th century, the conception of architectural space as the human habitat became widespread. The task of organizing space came to be understood as the "provision of certain opportunities for human life." The prominent contemporary architect Bernard Tschumi states that the essence of space lies in its descriptive dimension, being a central theme for philosophical, mathematical, and physical discussions. For him, space is the essence of both architecture and urbanism.

A clear and technical definition of space is presented by Jörg Kurt Grütter, who describes it as a vacuum (void) that can contain an object or be filled by something. According to the author, although space does not possess an exact and specific definition as an entity, it can be fully measurable through perception.

== Human Dimension ==
Every pictorial form begins with the point that sets itself in motion [...] The point moves [...] and the line is born – the first dimension. When the line shifts to form a plane, we obtain a two-dimensional element. In the movement from plane to spaces, the meeting of planes gives rise to the body (three-dimensional). A synthesis of kinetic energies that move the point converting it into a line, the line that converts into a plane and the plane that converts into a spatial dimension.

Architectural space can be divided into hierarchical levels: compartment, building, architectural ensemble, settlement. Subsequent generalizations extrapolate the limits of human "sensory perception" and are not considered architectural spaces. Furthermore, space can be divided into internal (contained within the volume of the building) and external. Space in architecture is the fundamental element that protects the human being from natural factors and encompasses the totality of their individual and social activities. In physical space, the human being satisfies their material and spiritual needs; the core essence of architecture is space, being the medium where man moves and lives. There are several types of spaces in architecture, which can be classified in various ways, depending on function or perception.

Space, in its absolute concept, does not present intrinsic characteristics by itself; however, as soon as a human group establishes an activity in a certain location, the symbolic meaning of space emerges. From that moment on, space becomes a stage for the expression of human activities and behaviors, transforming into a place of intersection between imagination and reality.

== Spatial Interpretation ==
In historiography, it is possible to perceive different "ways of seeing" architecture presented by Bruno Zevi. According to him, such interpretations are grouped into content-based, formalist, physio-psychological, and finally, spatial—the most complete, as it would involve a "living experience," suggesting a real three-dimensional movement influenced by distances, volumes, lights, and colors. Interpreting only one aspect of space would be to limit it, because, as Zevi points out:

...social content, psychological effect and formal values all materialize in space. To interpret space means therefore to include all the realities of a building (...) Who reasons about man (...) without passing from the useful theoretical distinction to the living and organic unity (...) would not have an integrated and comprehensive view of architecture.

The discussion of what constitutes architectural form and space dates back to classical antiquity with Vitruvius, but the fundamental outlines were defined in the 15th century by Leon Battista Alberti. Alberti sought to gather all knowledge into a normative theory, establishing the three basic conditions for architecture: firmness, commodity, and delight (solidity, utility, and beauty).

=== Volume and architectural space ===
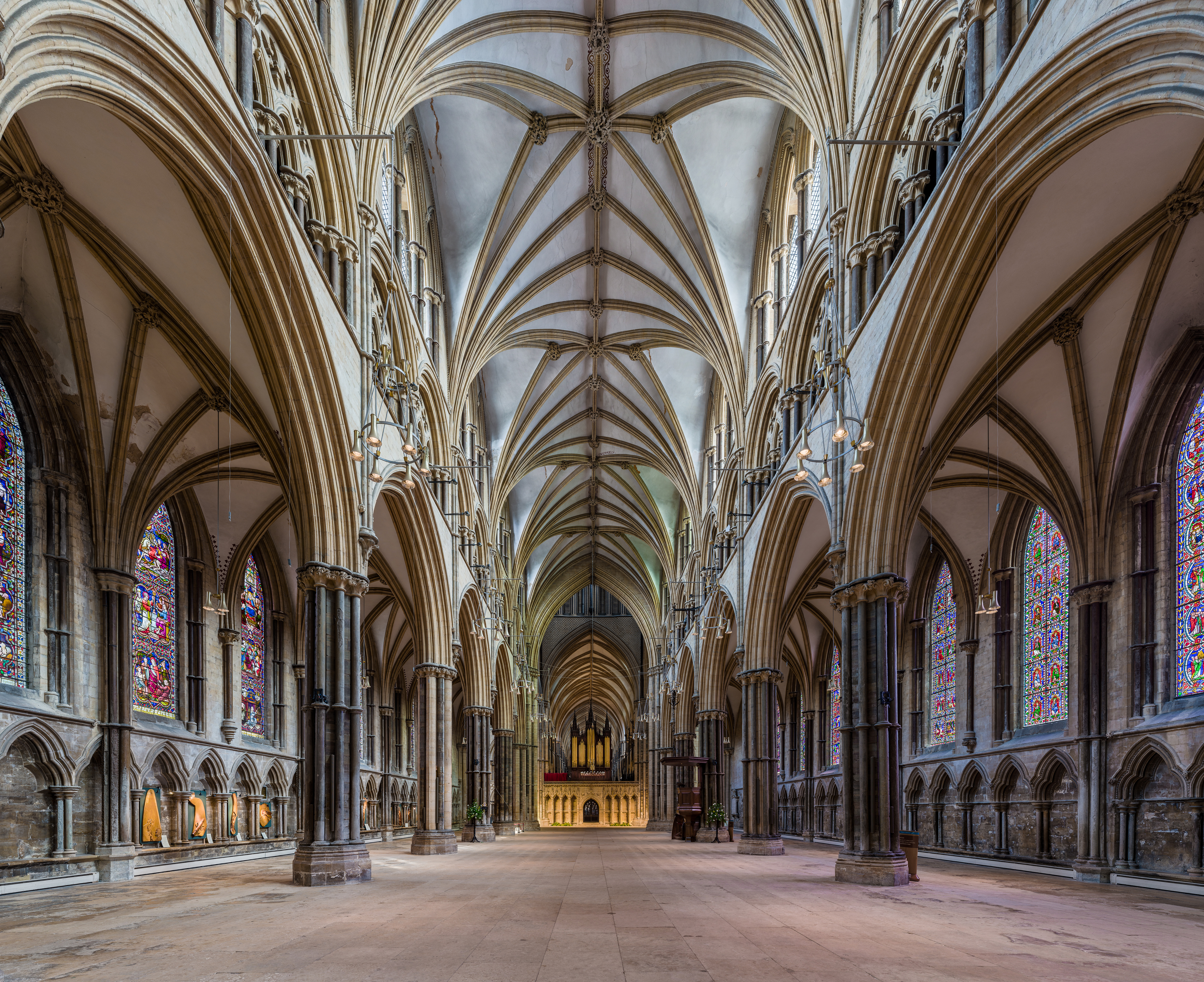
An intercolumniation of a colonnade, in this case that of Lincoln Cathedral, defines the rhythm, and is therefore the "tempo" that regulates the visual music of a temple. The way the size, shape, and location of openings or voids within the forms that delimit a space influence the form of the space, the focus of the space, and the lighting of its surfaces and forms.

The point indicates a position in space. Conceptually, it has no length, width, or depth, and is therefore static, centralized, and without direction. Translating a point yields the line with properties: length, direction, and sense, but it has no width. It expresses direction, movement, and development. Translating a line yields a plane with properties: length, width, shape, surface, orientation, and position. But it has no depth. Translating a plane yields a volume with properties: length, width, depth, form, space, surface, orientation, and position.

Architecture has space as its primordial element, detailing and delimiting it through volume. Architectural volume and architectural space are independent and, at times, their sensation and perception do not coincide. The volume does not always coincide with the material form that delimits it, as these vary according to the proportion of the interior levels; the visual dimension of color and texture; and the placement and orientation of windows and other transparent architectural elements.

The conception of "space" must be considered the distinctive quality of architecture, differentiating it from the plastic arts, such as painting or sculpture. According to Pevsner, "a bicycle shed is a building; Lincoln Cathedral is a work of architecture. [...] the architect creates a three-dimensional volume of air. This is the quality that distinguishes architecture from the art of the painter or sculptor." Our perception of the architectural work transcends the mere sensation produced by the two-dimensional treatment of the elevations of the surfaces—the facades and vertical planes—or even by the plastic modeling of the mass in its external form.

The uniqueness of architecture resides in the experience of the space it delimits. Unlike other forms of art, architecture requires penetration into the void; it is a phenomenon that reveals itself through the movement of the subject, who traverses the interior space of the work in a succession of multiple visual and physical impressions. It is in this synthesis between the body, time, and the enclosed volume that architecture fulfills its artistic and functional purpose.

According to Paul Frankl (1914), the visual impression, the image produced by differences in light and color, is primary in our perception of a building. Empirically, we reinterpret this image into a conception of physicality, which defines the form of the interior space... Once the optical image is interpreted into a conception of enclosed space within a mass, we read its purpose from the spatial form. According to Ching, form and space are the essential means of architecture, constituting a vocabulary of design elements; Alexander complements: Architecture represents a means of providing man with an existential foothold to create places charged with meaning

The concept of Space is used comprehensively in numerous fields and disciplines, such as philosophy, sociology, architecture, and urbanism. However, the multiplicity of the use of the term does not imply an identical understanding of the concept; studies indicate that there is almost no absolute consensus on its definition in scientific discussions, presenting high polysemy without a single definition that encompasses all its aspects.

Space is a general category that fills the universe and gives the environment a sense of comfort and security. Any human action has a spatial dimension, as every act performed requires space; this attachment derives from the need to establish communication, whether between humans or between man and the environment.

=== Perception ===
Space has a fluid nature and its definition is complex. It can seem subtle and vast, where the sense of dimension is lost, or so full of three-dimensional existence that it confers a special meaning on everything within its reach (visualizable, see: perspective). Although precise definition is difficult, space is measurable; the closest definition is to consider it as a vacuum that can contain an object or be filled. There is always a relationship between the observer and the space: the physical position of the person defines the space, which is perceived in different ways depending on the point of view.

In the modern era, the concept of space frequently replaced that of "place." Some consider "form" as its most important characteristic, but the meaning that the human being finds in physical elements depends on the cultural and ideological context. Edward T. Hall emphasizes the perception of space through the senses, recognizing that factors such as culture and language influence this experience, as in the case of the "audio-olfactory" space of the Eskimos.

Architecture is not the wall, but the space that the wall encloses. Space functions as the "negative" of the physical mass, and it is in this void, of the enclosed space, of the interior space in which men walk and live, that architecture really happens. As Nikolaus Pevsner argues, the difference between architecture and mere construction resides precisely in this manipulation of internal volume as an entity to be lived in.

Architectural space is not static; it is something "through which we can pass." Its apprehension requires the movement of the body in time, resulting in a multiple series of visual and physical impressions. Paul Frankl describes this phenomenon as the genesis of "spatial form" (Raumform), which is revealed through the succession of perspectives captured by the observer in motion. Space is considered "indefinable" because it has no form of its own; it assumes the form of its limits. At the moment we try to define space, we end up describing the surfaces that surround it—space and mass—and not space itself. This intrinsic nature makes space the most critical and, simultaneously, the most elusive element of architectural theory.

Contemporary theoretical thought criticizes the view that reduces architecture to the "graphism" of facades or the "elevations of the surface." True architecture begins where the optical vision ends and the spatial experience begins. Jörg Kurt Grütter stresses that full architectural perception requires the visual stimulus of the surface to be transcended in favor of the phenomenological experience of volume.

=== Genius loci ===
Historically, the Islamic intellectual tradition, through thinkers like Avicenna (Ibn Sina), rejected the view of space as an absolute void (vacuum), proposing instead that "place" (makan) is the contact surface that involves and sustains bodies, giving it an essentially qualitative and relational dimension.

In the tectonic and geometric dimension, physical and material organization defines the limits of space. Geometry is not treated as abstract data, but as the tool that establishes the morphology and metric through which the void becomes tangible. It represents the dialectical relationship between the built mass and the volume of air it encloses, defining the base structure of perception. A stylistic resource is the amor vacui (love of the void), and it is the philosophical basis that allows the transition from architecture as a "built object" to architecture as "lived space."

According to Jörg Kurt Grütter, space is not a neutral given, but an entity that emanates phenomenological qualities through its proportions, textures, and the incidence of light. These qualities act directly on the user's cognitive and emotional state. Aesthetic perception, in this view, is inseparable from the sensory and bodily experience of the subject in space, where physical stimulus transforms into a psychological response. According to Christian Norberg-Schulz, architectural space transcends geometry to constitute a place (Genius Loci). This dimension involves the transmission of metaphysical and cultural meanings that reflect the designer's world view. The truth of space is achieved when there is symmetry between the system of thought and the intentions of the creator and the interpretative code of the enjoyer. For the author, architecture fulfills its function when it allows the human being to orient and identify with the environment that surrounds them.

The analysis of urban space (open space) requires the development of a theoretical framework that relates places to people's lives and experiences and that examines the relationship between people, their activities and the spaces they create or inhabit

== Philosophical of space ==
The conception of space in classical antiquity was based on two main strands that shaped Western thought. Lucretius, supporting Aristotle's theory, described space through the concept of the vacuum, stating that the universe is based on two fundamental pillars: bodies and the void. According to this view, bodies have specific locations in the vacuum and move within it. Subsequently, spatial theories evolved under the influence of Euclidean geometry, establishing a system based on mental abstraction. Euclidean space was defined as a uniform, homogeneous, continuous, and fully measurable entity, characterized by the absence of physical curvatures or irregularities.

Historically, two fundamental definitions stood out that competed over the centuries. The Platonic definition visualizes space as a fixed and indestructible entity, functioning as a receptacle for everything that is generated. This perspective obtained greater historical success, being integrated into the Renaissance and complemented by the theories of Isaac Newton, culminating in the idea of an absolute and three-dimensional space. In contrast, the Aristotelian definition presents space as Topos or place, understanding it as a part of a larger system where the limit of space coincides strictly with the volume of the body that occupies it.

In the sixteenth century, Giordano Bruno challenged the Aristotelian tradition by suggesting that space is perceived through the relationships between objects and the surfaces or walls that delimit it. In the field of arts, Giotto played a crucial role by introducing perspective based on Euclidean space, creating a new methodology of spatial organization. With the advent of the Renaissance, three-dimensionality became a function of linear perspective, which deepened the distinction between the visual world perceived by man and the reality of the visual field.

== Modern and contemporary perspectives ==
During the seventeenth and eighteenth centuries, spatial thought bifurcated between rationalism and empiricism. Descartes gave space a quantitative dimension by introducing the system of Cartesian coordinates, allowing the metric identification of distances. On the other hand, Leibniz defended the theory of relative space, interpreting it as a system of relationships between coexisting elements. Simultaneously, Isaac Newton postulated the existence of absolute space and time, real and infinite recipients where natural events occur independently of objects and phenomena.

In contemporary phenomenology, the contributions of Watsuji Tetsuro and Martin Heidegger were decisive. Tetsuro rejected the abstraction of pure geometry, focusing on the relationship between man and the environment through subjectivity and social interaction. For this author, space materializes through streets and the presence of the other. Heidegger defined space as something that gives way to a freed horizon, suggesting that the essence of space resides in the preparation of a place for the positioning and realization of the being.

== Theory of architecture ==
The reality of architecture is shaped by the interaction between form and space, operating through a unity of opposites. Our visual field organizes heterogeneous elements into two fundamental groups: positive elements, perceived as figure, and negative elements, which act as background. In architecture, these relationships are dynamic; depending on perception, a building can be the positive figure that defines the void of the street, or an urban square can emerge as the positive element against the background of the surrounding built mass.

Bruno Zevi, in his work Saber Ver a Arquitetura, 1948, establishes that the essence of architecture is interior space, which can only be properly defined through the movement and kinesthesia of the observer. Zevi analyzes the history of architecture based on this premise, contrasting the static mass of Egyptian pyramids or Greek temples with the spatial revolution of Christian churches, where the space turns into a fluid path that liberates the observer from the limitations of classical architecture.

Several thinkers expanded the sociocultural dimension of this concept. Lewis Mumford argues that urban space is the manifestation of human goals and the vehicle for transmitting cultural heritage. Kenzo Tange visualizes the city as a living organism where space serves the formation of the human being. Amos Rapoport defines space as a system of inter-relations that protects man, while Manuel Castells states that space is the material dimension of society itself, shaped by human action. Finally, Bernard Tschumi and Jörg Kurt Grütter reinforce that, although space is a vacuum without intrinsic form, it is fully measurable through perception and constitutes the essence of both architecture and urbanism.

According to the foundations of Francis D. K. Ching, the definition of space is operated through the manipulation of horizontal and vertical planes. An elevated base plane establishes a domain of hierarchy and prominence, while a lowered base plane isolates a field of space; if the level change is deep, visual continuity is interrupted, transforming the field into an autonomous enclosure.

Vertical elements are fundamental for providing enclosure and privacy. L-shaped planes stand out, generating a corner and a diagonal spatial field of shelter; parallel planes, which define a strong directional quality; and the configuration of four planes, which constitutes the most typical type of spatial definition, resulting in a fully enclosed space.

The relationship between the form and the surrounding space allows for various configurations of dominance over the terrain. An architectural volume can form a wall to define a positive external space, surround and delimit an interior courtyard, or merge its interior with the exterior through walled grounds. These strategies allow the building to be situated as a distinct form that dominates the site or, conversely, that the external spaces function as a natural extension of the internal spaces.

Architectural space has evolved from a geometric abstraction to a lived and symbolic reality. It transforms from an absolute vacuum into a place where imagination and reality intersect as soon as a human activity is established in it. Architecture thus fulfills its primary purpose by organizing the void to be inhabited, integrating movement and social relations in the construction of the human habitat. As Faramarz Parsi emphasizes, the understanding of urban space requires a theoretical framework that links places to people's experiences and lives.

The concept of architectural space throughout history has been subject to continuous reflection and revision by professionals such as architects and art historians, noting their various forms of thought, based on the tradition, theory, and architectural culture of the moment of the development of the work. The four spaces are functionality, technique, costs, and comfort. Also influencing the political and cultural uses of the moment and all at the same time influenced by many attempts at the definition of space within the scope of philosophy, science, and art throughout history.

Spatial organizations articulate these elements into coherent patterns. According to Ching, these can be centralized (focused on a dominant space), linear (a sequence that expresses direction), radial, clustered, or in a grid, the latter organizing space within a three-dimensional structural field.

The concept of space has become a historical creation, and as far as the Modern Age is concerned, the building and its surrounding environment have intervened in a very special way in its concept. That is, in its dual architectural and urban dimension. The relationships established between them and with their surrounding environment are important, acting as a decisive element in the Modern Age for architects and urban planners when designing their works. This was already recognized in the Quattrocento by Leon Battista Alberti, the first great theorist of the Renaissance, when he indicated that "the street would result more beautiful if all the porticoes were made in the same way and the buildings intended for housing, well aligned on one side and the other, and not one more than the other..." (De Re Aedificatoria, 1450). Alberti also claimed a link between the building and its exterior space upon which the creation of urban space depended. And this idea ended up being part of a new idea of city construction from the 15th and 18th centuries.

The transition to the spatial consciousness that architecture is distinguished from other plastic arts by possessing space as its primary and defining element, consolidated at the turn of the 19th to the 20th century, when German historiography shifted the focus from physical construction to the void created by it. The concepts of space and spatiality presented fit into the line of research initiated by late 19th-century German scholars, known as historians of Einfühlung—a line whose assumptions are incorporated a few years later in the theoretical foundation of the modern movement. These assumptions consist of the understanding of the spatial condition based on the body in motion; space being conceptualized and evaluated based on the architectural promenade, the quality of the walk, the way in which the relationship between the body in motion, walls, and furniture is established, whether on the scale of the building or on the scale of the city.

== Historical paradigms and modernity ==
A major paradigm shift occurred when theorists, notably German, began to define architecture not by "mass" (walls, columns) but by the "void" (interior space). For August Schmarsow, who emerges as a central figure in this transition, architecture is the configurator of space, according to the sense of the term we created, and its history is the history of spatial feeling. For Schmarsow, architecture is the objectification of the human spatial sense; it is born from the need to create an envelope for the body, becoming the "art of space." Alois Riegl introduces the idea that the history of architecture is the history of the "conquest of space." According to Riegl, human perception evolved from a "tactile-monumental" phase (where the building is a solid and impenetrable object, like the pyramids) to an "optical-spatial" phase, where the void becomes the protagonist of the composition. For Riegl, architecture is the only art that manages to "give body to space," transforming the void into something that vision and touch can apprehend through light and surface.

Three great cycles can be identified, according to some authors such as Sigfried Giedion: The first phase (space as volume), which reaches its peak in Egypt, Sumeria and Ancient Greece, where space was constituted by the "interaction between volumes" and where interior space was not considered with importance, the building is understood as a plastic object placed in a scenario. According to the author, in this age interior space is practically non-existent or secondary; the essence of the architectural fact resides in the interaction of volumes in the outer space. The Greek temple, for example, is a sculpture on an urban scale where spatiality is experienced "from the outside," through the radiation of the built mass in the surrounding void.

Second phase (space as interior), from the late Roman period to the 19th century, with the Pantheon of Rome as its fundamental landmark. Architecture ceases to be an external object to become the art of delimiting the interior. The concept of "container-space" or "box-space" emerges. In this phase there is an absolute separation between the interior and the exterior.

The third phase (space-time) emerges with the Industrial Revolution and the introduction of new materials such as steel and reinforced concrete. The technique finally allows the release of space from the dictatorship of the wall as a support. It is considered that it is in this phase that the concept of the "fourth dimension" in architecture arises. The architectural box is broken; surfaces cease to be static limits and become fluid planes. Through transparency and the free plan, the interior and the exterior merge into a spatial continuous. Modern space is dynamic. Influenced by cubism and futurism, modern architecture abandons the static and centralized perspective inherited from the Renaissance.. One of the spaces that initially embodies this conception of space in the modern movement is the interior of the Crystal Palace in London, by Joseph Paxton (1803-1865).

Modern space is presented as essentially dynamic: it cannot be captured through a single static point of view. On the contrary, it requires the movement of the observer through time to be captured in its totality. The simultaneity of visions, the overlap of planes and transparency are the tools that allow modern architecture to express this new physical and conceptual reality, where the fourth dimension—time—becomes inseparable from the spatial experience. Although the Modern Movement has released space through the free plan, it often resulted in an abstract space and dehumanization resulting from the loss of the notion of "place" in favor of an "abstract space" and universal that did not consider the cultural or affective specificities of individuals. The concept of in-between space emerges to recover the human and social dimension that had been lost in the "rigidity" of radical functionalism. The radical modern space is criticized for being "cold" and for ignoring the human scale. Aldo Van Eyck, argued that modern architecture had failed by not offering what he called "configuration for human encounter." From the point of view of some critics, by destroying the "box" and creating total transparency and the absolute free plan, the feeling of protection, intimacy and identity that the human being needs in their habitat was sometimes eliminated. The "in-between space" emerges precisely as the antidote to this scenario, trying to reintroduce the scale of man and social relations in architecture.

=== Frank Lloyd Wright ===
Frank Lloyd Wright is fundamentally credited with "breaking the box" of Victorian architecture. He saw the traditional closed room as a limitation to human freedom, stating that "the box was a coffin for the human spirit." By moving structural supports away from the corners, he allowed the space to "leak" to the outside, creating a continuity between man and nature. For Wright, the elimination of the corner was the source of spatial liberation.

=== Adolf Loos ===
Different from horizontal fluidity, Adolf Loos developed the 'Raumplan' (Spatial Plan). This concept dictates that each environment of a house must have a ceiling height proportional to its social importance or technical function. As he did not design in two-dimensional planes, but in volumes, Loos created complex sections where rooms fitted into different levels. This approach prioritized volume economy and the richness of internal experience at the expense of external ornamentation.

=== Le Corbusier ===
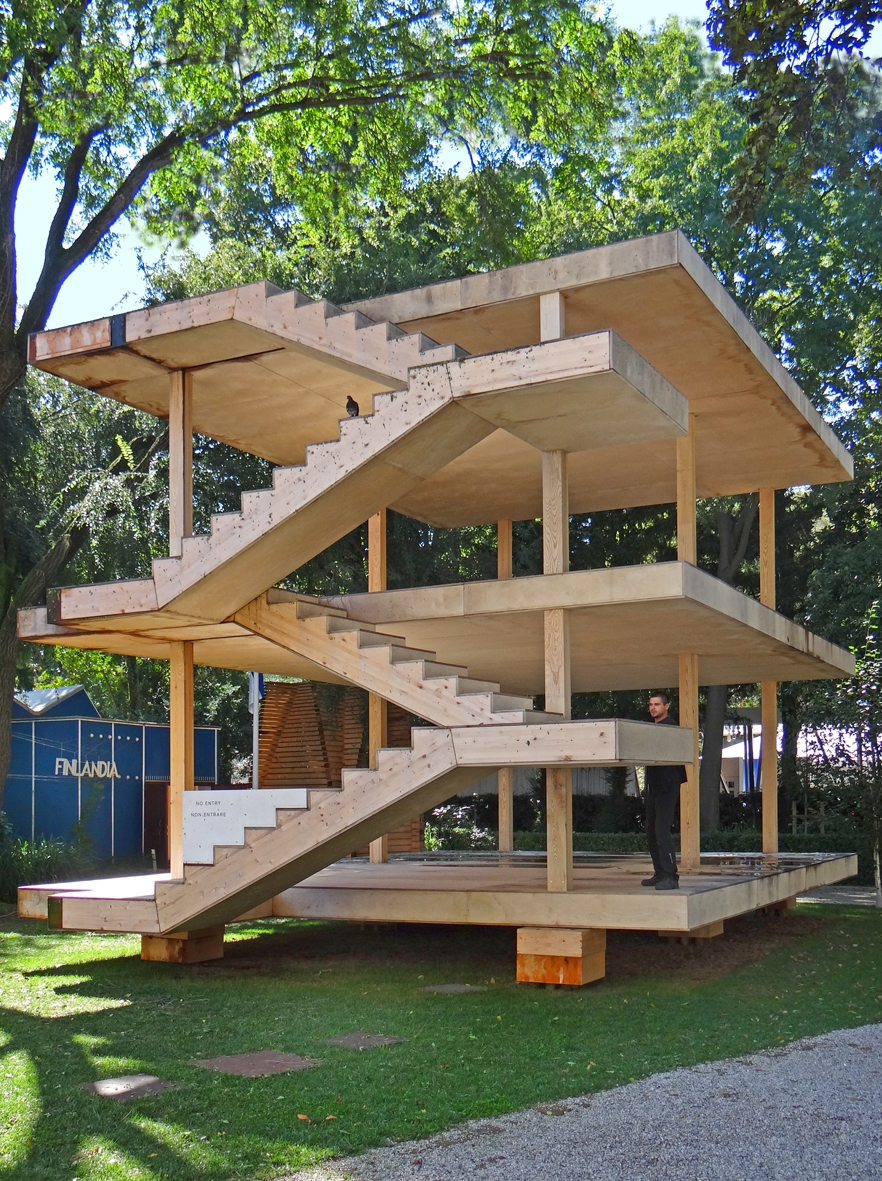
The Dom-ino house, model reproduced in 2014.

Le Corbusier revolutionized space through the separation between structure and closure. With the system of concrete pillars and slabs (System Dom-ino), he established the free plan (plan libre), where internal walls can be positioned freely because they do not have a structural function. This is one of his five points of new architecture, formulated in 1926, allowing the layout of each floor to be independent and the "free facade" to become a light and glazed "skin." (Note: Free plan and free facade mentioned, the other three points are, therefore, pilotis, ribbon window and roof garden.)

Le Corbusier identifies the experience of ineffable space with an interpretation of the fourth dimension, in the sense of how the human body feels space: "The fourth dimension seems to be the moment of unlimited escape provoked by an exceptionally just consonance of the plastic means put into action and activated by them."

This state does not depend on the theme of the work, but on a "victory of proportionality in all things," functioning as a "catalytic miracle of sapience acquired, assimilated, perhaps forgotten."

The author describes the interaction between the built object and the observer as a "true manifestation of plastic acoustics." The work of art projects "waves, shouts or clamors" onto the surroundings, causing the site to be "shaken, affected, dominated or caressed." "Then an unlimited depth opens, erases the walls, dissolves the contingent presences, realizes the miracle of the ineffable space."

For the achievement of this "magnification of space," Le Corbusier proposes the inseparable union between architecture, sculpture and painting. He states that the architect must be an "impeccable plastic artist," as the "key to aesthetic emotion is a spatial function." Without the sense of space, the architect "loses their reason for being and their right to exist."

=== Mies van der Rohe ===
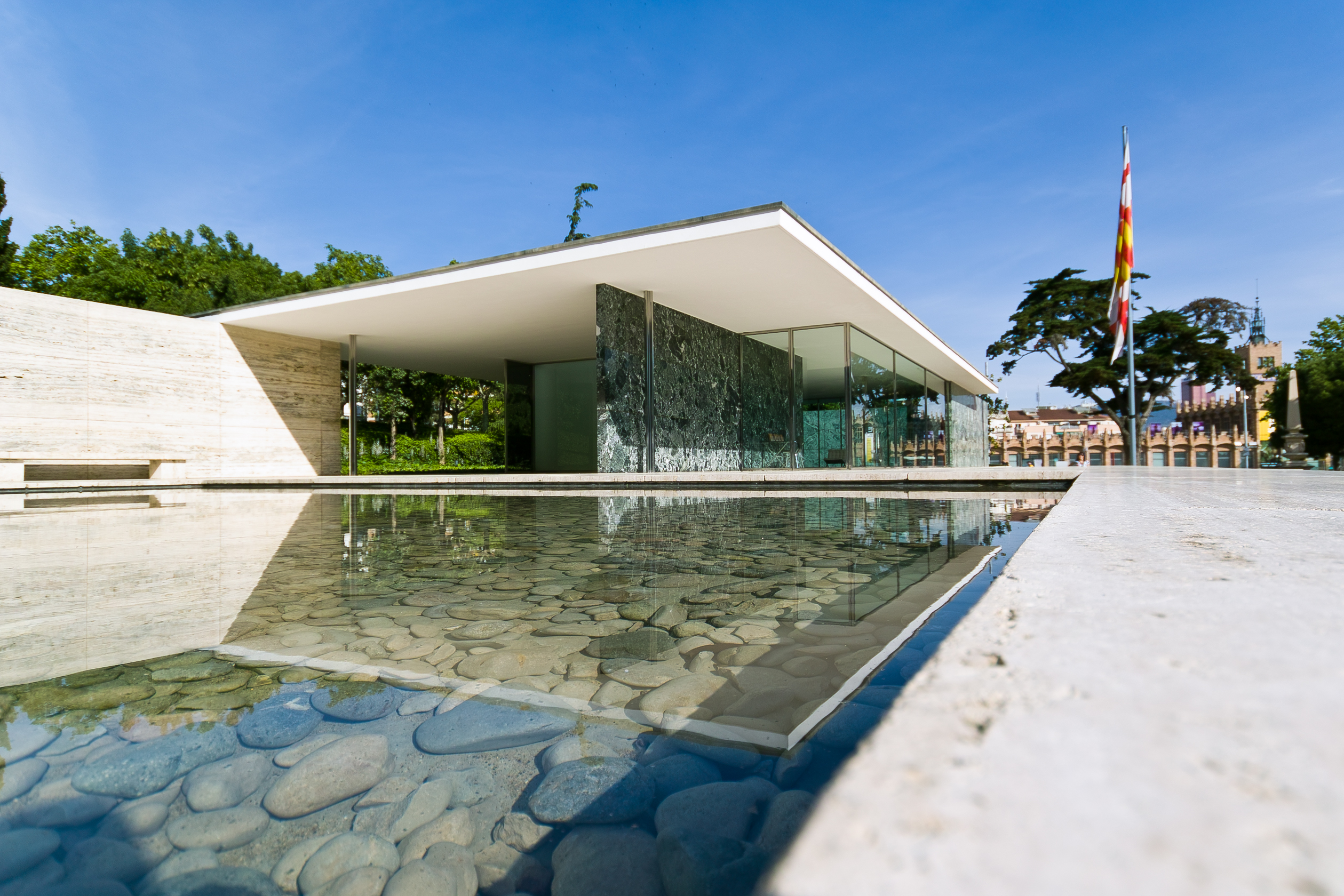
The Barcelona Pavilion was built in 1929 for the Universal Exhibition. The pavilion is considered an icon of the modernist architecture movement, stimulates movement and the experience of the user who experiences different points of view while permeating the environments.

Mies van der Rohe developed an approach where structure is the ultimate expression of architecture, allowing what he called Universal Space (or total space). For Mies, the building should be a flexible structure capable of housing any function, based on the concept that "less is more." His spatial evolution is divided into two fundamental moments:

Fluid Space (European Phase): In the Barcelona Pavilion (1929), Mies used vertical planes of marble and glass that never completely close. The space has no defined "inside" or "outside," but flows continuously between the planes, supported by cruciform chrome pillars that seem to disappear in the light. Universal Space (American Phase): In projects like S. R. Crown Hall or the Seagram Building, Mies moves the structure to the perimeter, creating large free spans without any internal pillar. The space becomes an absolute and monumental void, where the "skin and bone" (glass and steel) define the border..

The contribution of Mies is seen as the final purification of Corbusier's free plan, transforming it into a continuous and homogeneous spatial field, where technical precision replaces pictorial composition. Contemporary analysis points out that these innovations allowed the transition from an architecture of "watertight enclosures" to one of continuous and articulated spaces, influencing architectural production until the 21st century.

=== Robert Venturi ===
With Robert Venturi, space begins to be understood as a support for communication and symbolism, especially in the transition to the 1970s with the works Complexity and Contradiction in Architecture (1966) and Learning from Las Vegas (1972). Venturi argues that space is the product of a complex operation where there is a clear distinction between what happens inside and what is projected outside. Venturi breaks with modernist 'simplification' and its 'transparent unity', defending a design where the 'interior-facade tension' is the result of a 'complex operation', allowing the internal space (shelter) and the external face (ornament/sign) to function independently."

Space should not be just functional or "clear," but rather evoke different simultaneous interpretations. With Venturi, the "free plan" and the "transparent unity" (characteristics of the free plan of Le Corbusier or Mies van der Rohe) are expressly rejected in favor of a more complex, tense, and communicative spatial organization. The author "defends confused vitality against transparent unity. He accepts the lack of logic and proclaims duality.".

=== Charles Moore ===
Charles Moore rejects universal and infinite space. Unlike Mies van der Rohe, who sought the continuity of space, which must flow around elements, Moore uses a 'subtle insinuation of interior spaces' to create niches and places of refuge, the concept of aedicule. In his New Haven house (1967), Moore breaks with the rigid stratification of floors: "Moore experimented with the creation of several spatial 'wells', thus visually integrating the basement, ground floor and first floor of the house." In tune with Venturi's maxim "Less is a bore," Moore prioritizes the attractiveness and scenic charge of the interior over a strict functionalism.

Architectural space ceases to be an abstract "free plan" to become a place of multiple meanings, where elements function in several ways at the same time. The concept of "box within the box," where columns or light wells create new centers and hierarchies that do not depend on the main structure, is a reinterpretation of elements abstracting historical influences and transforming them into something contemporary. An architecture of communication, where the "light-object becomes essential as an element of language."

=== Contemporary Perspectives ===
==== Sou Fujimoto ====
For Sou Fujimoto, architecture is located on the threshold between the "nest" and the "cave." Comparing architectural space to a forest: a field of densities where the borders between "inside" and "outside" dissolve, Sou Fujimoto points out:

"A 'nest' and a 'cave' may seem similar, but they are opposites. The nest is a space prepared for the human being, functional and comfortable. The cave is just a natural place that exists. However, the cave is what interests me: a space that is not functionally prescriptive, but rather a place of possibilities where the inhabitant discovers their own way of living. [...] A forest is a place made of very distinct elements, but which together create a continuous whole. I aspire to an architecture that is like a forest: a field of diversity where one can find their own place within a complex system. [...] Architecture is about creating a place where 'inside' and 'outside' merge. I don't draw walls, I draw the 'in-between space'."

According to the author, architecture should not enclose the void with rigid walls, but rather generate a "place of possibilities" where the human body is free to feel alive through its own perception.

The architect is closely linked to oriental concepts such as Ma (the interval or space between things in Japanese culture), which Sou Fujimoto explores deeply.
