= Free plan =

Architectural concept

In architecture, a free plan refers to the spatial flexibility made possible by structural systems in which interior walls are not required to be load-bearing. Because interior partitions have no structural purpose, they can be placed where ever they are needed to define individual spaces or rooms. The weight of the building is typically supported by a grid of columns.

The free plan was important for modern architecture with noted modernist architect Le Corbusier first proposing it in his 1914 Dom-Ino House prototype. He would later include it as the third of his "Five Points of a New Architecture". Free plans may be open plan.

== Definition ==
Free plan, in the architecture world, refers to the ability to have a floor plan with non-load bearing walls and floors by creating a structural system that holds the weight of the building by way of an interior skeleton of load bearing columns. The building system carries only its columns, or skeleton, and each corresponding ceiling. Free plan allows for the ability to create buildings without being limited by the placement of walls for structural support, and enables an architect to have the freedom to design the outside and inside façade without compromise.

== Influences ==
Le Corbusier became the pioneer of free plan during the 1914 through 1930s with his "Five Points of New Architecture" and his adoption of the Dom-ino System. This heavily influenced the importance of free plan and its role in the "modern era" of architecture.

== Dom-ino Structural System ==
The Dom-ino system refers to the structural system that allows a free floor and wall plan, due to the load bearing columns within the skeleton of the structure. Originally conceived as a two story building, six vertical columns held the two concrete, steel reinforced floors in space. This allowed for exterior walls that accommodate to the aesthetic and compositional features of the building. This also created a free floor plan, moving from the previous ideology of load bearing walls. This new technology allowed for long strips of windows that could wrap corners and stretch greater lengths, something that was never seen before in architecture. This building system became a staple for high production buildings because of its cheap and fast production rate. Ways could be fashioned in any way, restrained only by technological advancements of the time.

== Le Corbusier and the Five Points of a New Architecture ==
Le Corbusier adopted what he considered to be the most important five architectural points in his architecture: pilotis, free plan, horizontal windows, a free façade and roof top gardens. The ideas all surface around the main point of free plan and the use of the Dom-ino system. The piloti system carries all the weight allowing for a free plan as well as a free façade. The free exterior façade allowed for vast openings and horizontal strips of windows creating aesthetic value. All of the five points work together, being based on the premises of the Dom-ino system, varied to a degree for aesthetic purposes.

== Examples ==
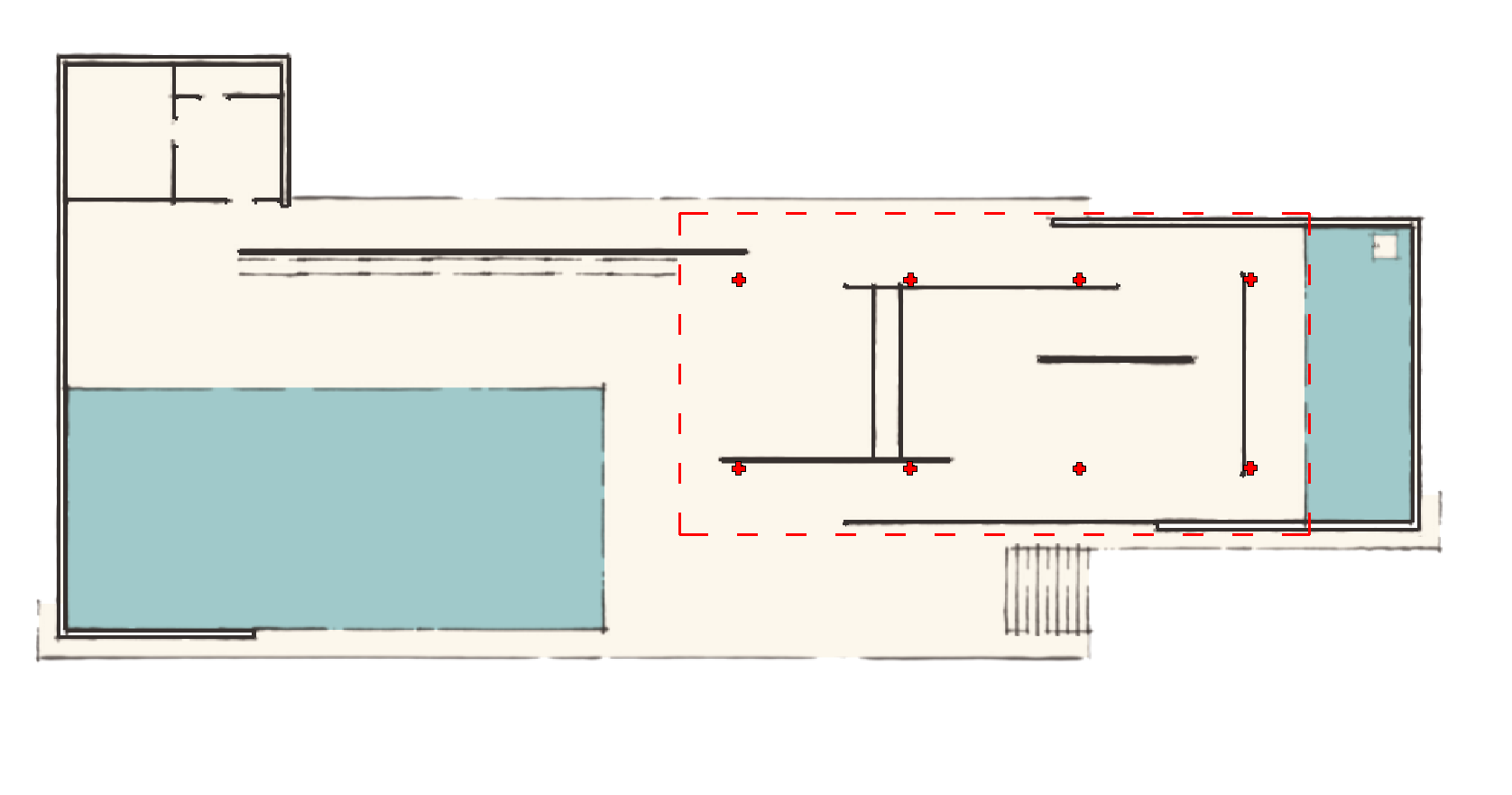
Plan of the Barcelona Pavilion. The columns (red) support the roof, while the walls are freely positioned.

Although Corbusier had become the pioneer of free plan in his own architecture, some other notable architects continued to follow in his footsteps, using free plan in their architecture as well. Two notable architects include Ludwig Mies van der Rohe and Eduardo Catalano. Three of Van Der Rohe's most notable buildings that portray the use of free plan are the Barcelona Pavilion and the New National Gallery in Berlin and the Crown Hall building at the Illinois Institute of Technology. All three of these buildings show great expanses in floor plan due to the freedom from use of free plan. Notably, the Barcelona Pavilion expresses free plan by having glass walls and large expanses and openings in the outside façade of the building. It also has a completely open free floor plan in the interior with sections divided by walls lower than ceiling height to distinguish rooms and areas, something that can be done in any fashion through the use of free plan.

Of Corbusier's architecture, the Villa Savoye demonstrates his five points in the most successful way, including free plan. By using free plan, the exterior façade of the building has large horizontal window bands to help achieve greater amounts of light reach the inside of the building. The interior also demonstrates free plan by not being limited by load bearing walls, but instead having large, openings and rooms in the inside façade of the building.

Eduardo Catalano achieves the ultimate free plan in his Catalano residence in Raleigh, North Carolina in 1955 by using thin shell concrete to achieve a completely free floor plan. By using the concrete in his roof, he designs a hyperbolic parabolic roof that is self-supporting with only two points touching the ground. No other points of contact support the roof. In doing this he achieves a floor plan that is completely independent of its roof structure. The roof stands by itself, and creates its own structure. This achieves, by definition, a completely independent free plan.
