= Plaza de las Naciones Unidas (Buenos Aires) =

Square in Buenos Aires

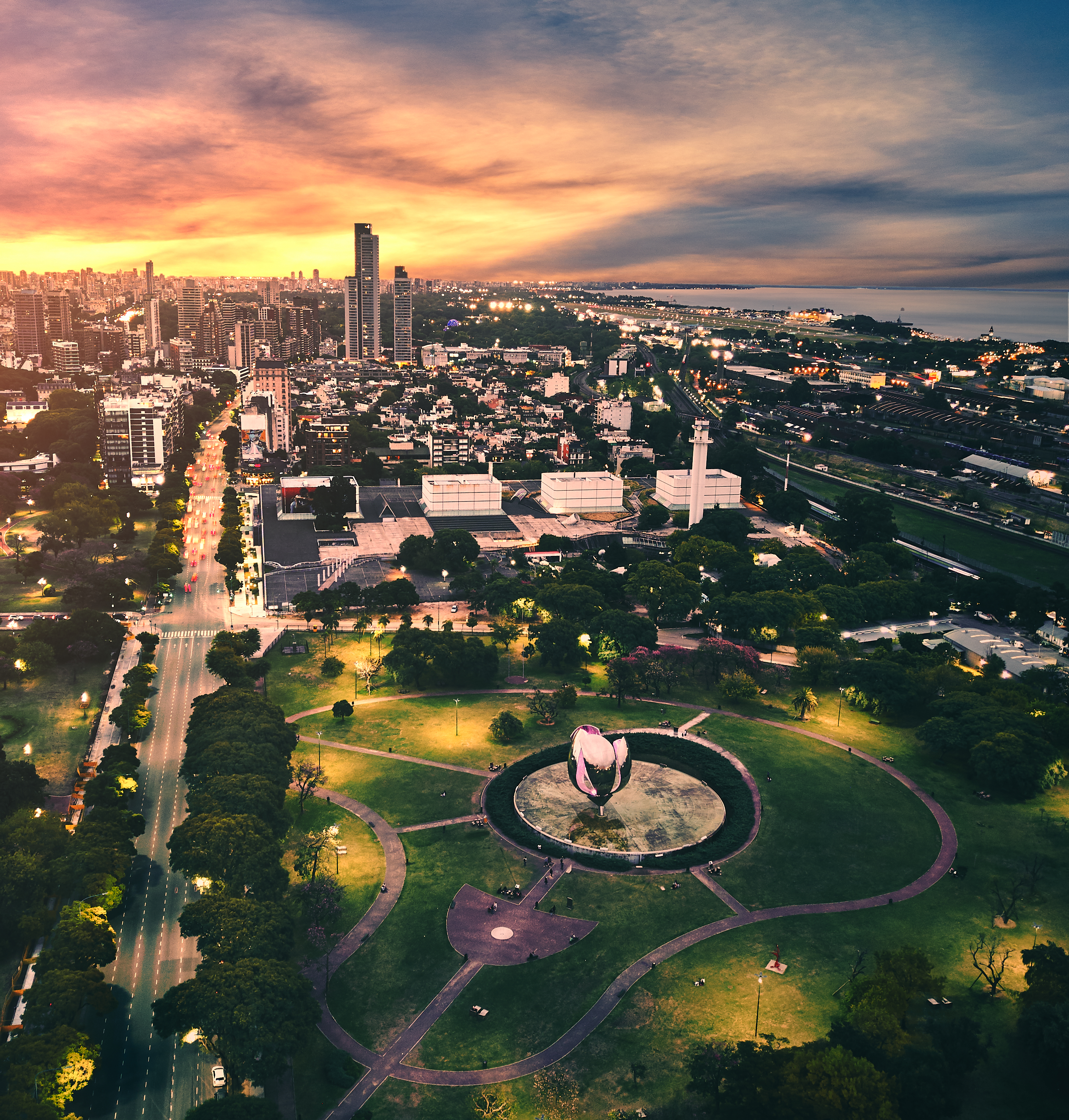
Aerial view of the square

Plaza de las Naciones Unidas (in English: United Nations Square) is a square located in the Recoleta neighborhood of Buenos Aires, Argentina. The square covers 4 hectares (9,88 acres) and has extensive green areas. It's near the Law School of the University of Buenos Aires and the state-owned TV channel Televisión Pública. In the 1970s, the Argentinian government planned for the site the construction of the Altar of the Fatherland, a mausoleum.

In the center of the square stands the Floralis Genérica sculpture. It was gifted to the city by the Argentinian architect Eduardo Catalano and inaugurated on April 13, 2002. It represents a large flower made of stainless steel, with a skeleton of aluminum and reinforced concrete, facing the sky, extending its 6 petals towards it. It weighs 18 tons (40.320 pounds) and is 23 meters (75,45 ft) high.

In a corner of the square, there is a 2,10 meters (6,88 ft) replica of the Poseidon of Artemisium sculpture, which was donated by the Greek community of Buenos Aires in 1999.
