= Ariston Club =

Building in Mar del Plata, Argentina

Coordinates: 38°06′24″S 57°34′30″W

Parador Ariston
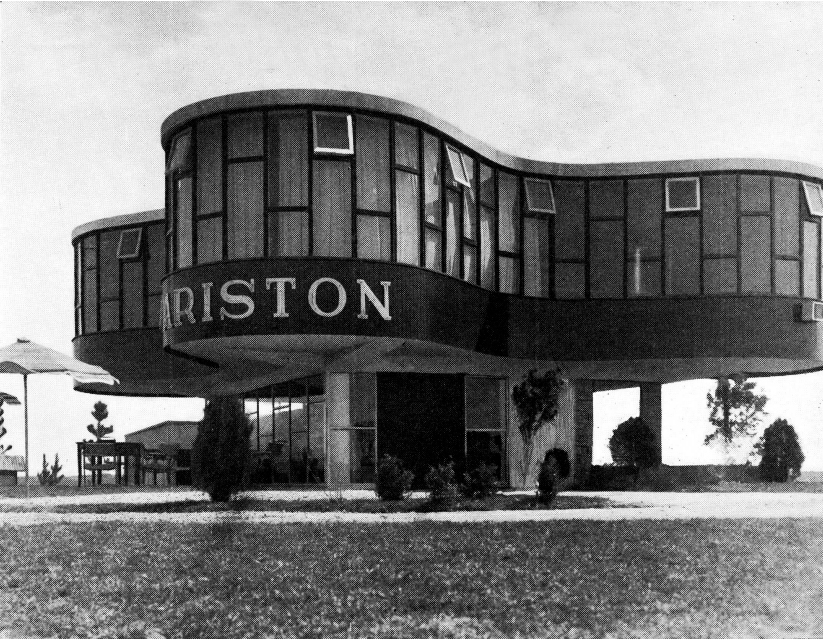
- The Building in its original state

Design and construction
- Architect: Marcel Breuer

The Ariston Club is a building in Mar del Plata, Argentina designed by Marcel Breuer. It is part of the Modern Movement, and complies with four of the five Le Corbusier's Points of Architecture: pilotis, free designing of the floor plan, free designing of the façade, horizontal windows.

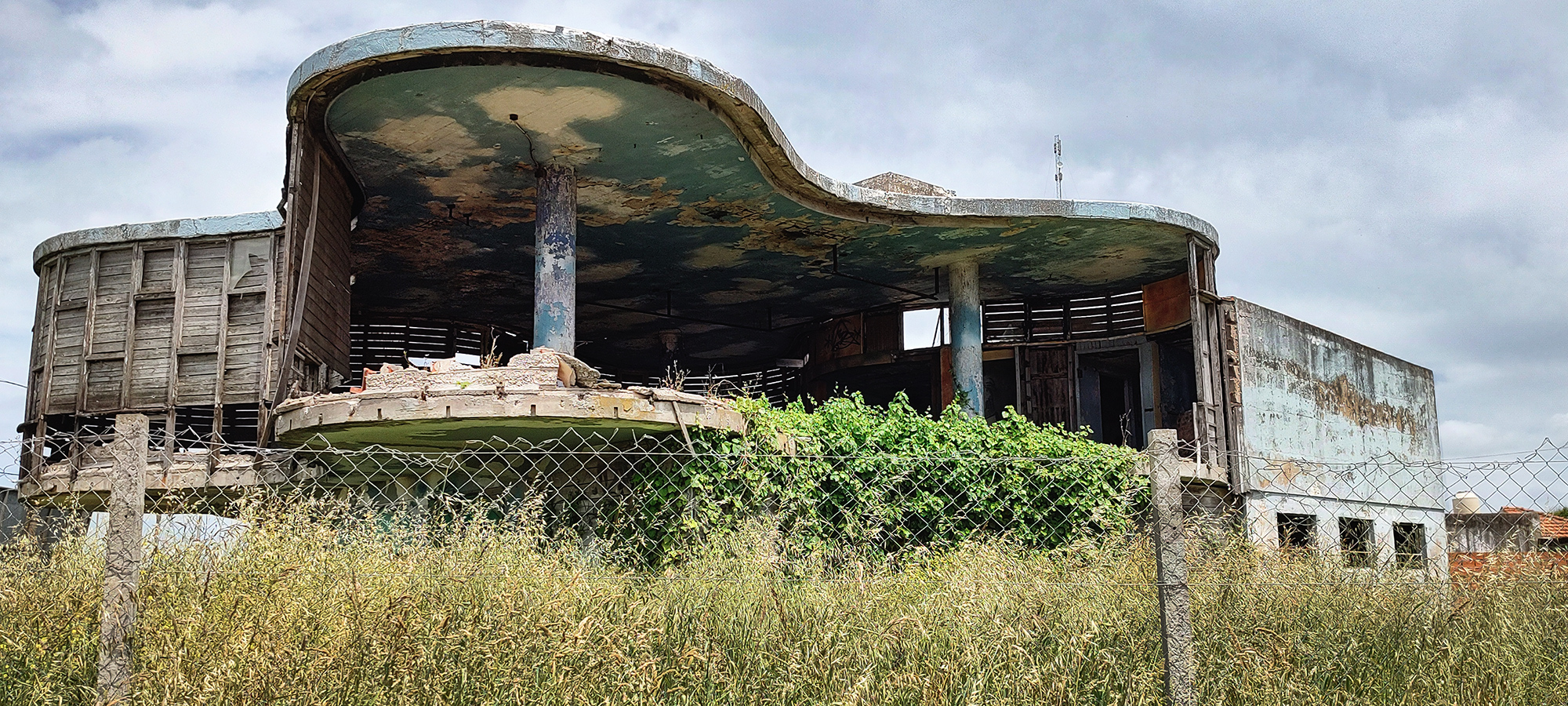
The abandoned Ariston Club, in 2021

Since 2019, it is a National Historic Monument of Argentina.

== History ==
Built in two months during 1948, it is Breuer's only work in Latin America. Its construction was commissioned by the University of Buenos Aires School of Architecture, and local architects Carlos Coire and Eduardo Catalano associated on the project. It was designed to promote the sale of lots in a nearby real state development.

Since 1993, it has been abandoned.

== Design ==
Its design, which features a floating concrete double clover, supported by four thin pillars that are not visible from the outside—and featuring volcanic lava tiles—surrounded by wave-shaped glass and wood, is considered to be ahead of its time. It was built using regional materials as well, such as the stone used in the back wall and wood used in the cladding and openings.

=== Uses ===
Initially, the building was designed to hold a cafeteria and restaurant. Its designed allowed for all tables to be placed next to a window.

Its golden age was during the fifties when the restaurant was operating. However, from then on, the building fell on disgrace. Several cafeterias used it during the seventies, and, during the eighties, the Bruma y Arena (Mist & Sand) café-bar was installed. Then, the Maryana dancing club followed. During the nineties, it housed the Parrilla Perico barbecue. These uses modified the original structure and downgraded the building's design.

== Present day ==
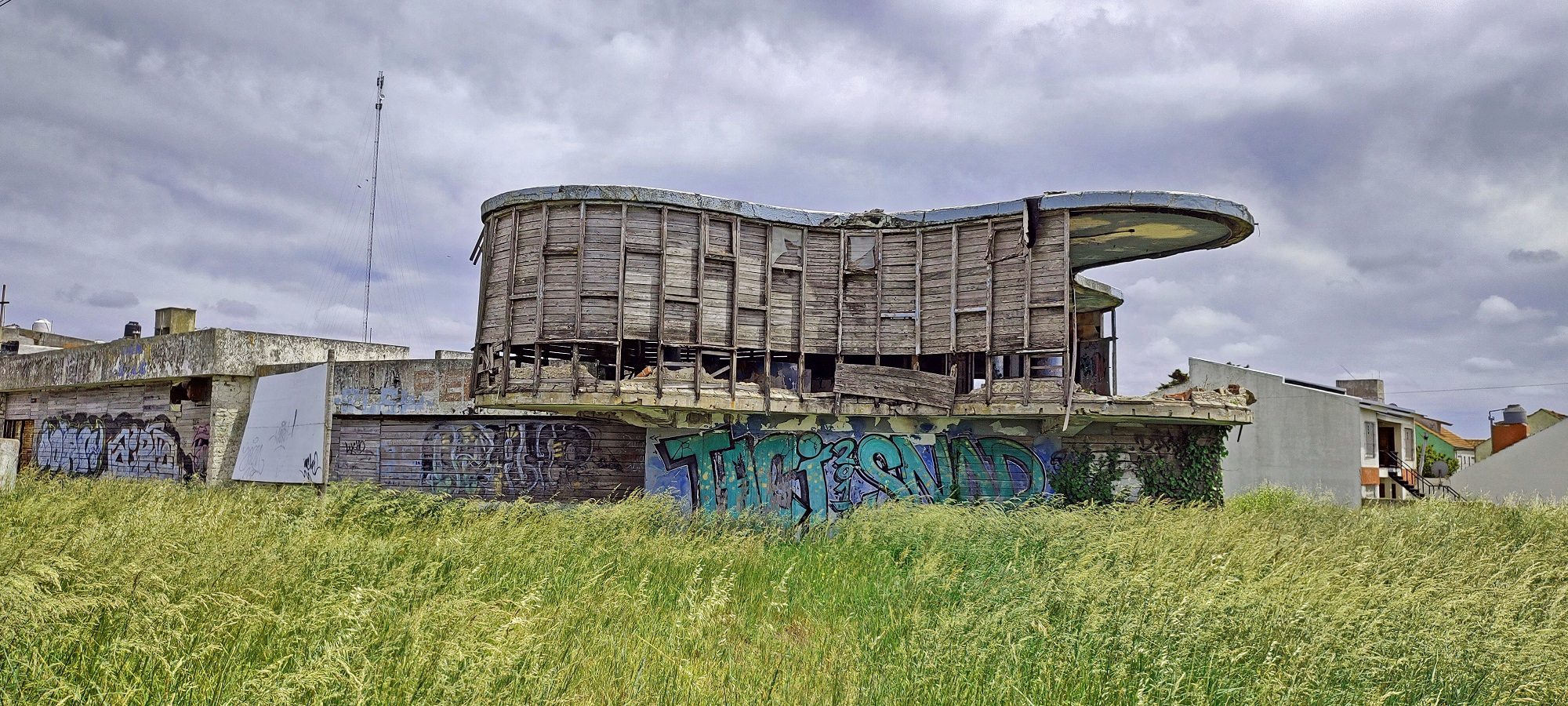
Run down, in 2021

In 2019, as the Ariston Club was declared National Historical Monument, a proposal for restoration was started, alongside a Change.org petition. There were concerns about possible structural damage caused by the abandonment and marine corrosion (as the building is located next to the sea), that could impede the restoration. However, a technical report concluded the restoration was possible, as the structural damage was low and limited to certain areas.
