= MALBA =

Art museum in Buenos Aires, Argentina

Coordinates: 34°34′37.1″S 58°24′12.2″W

Latin American Art Museum of Buenos Aires
- Museo de Arte Latinoamericano de Buenos Aires (MALBA)

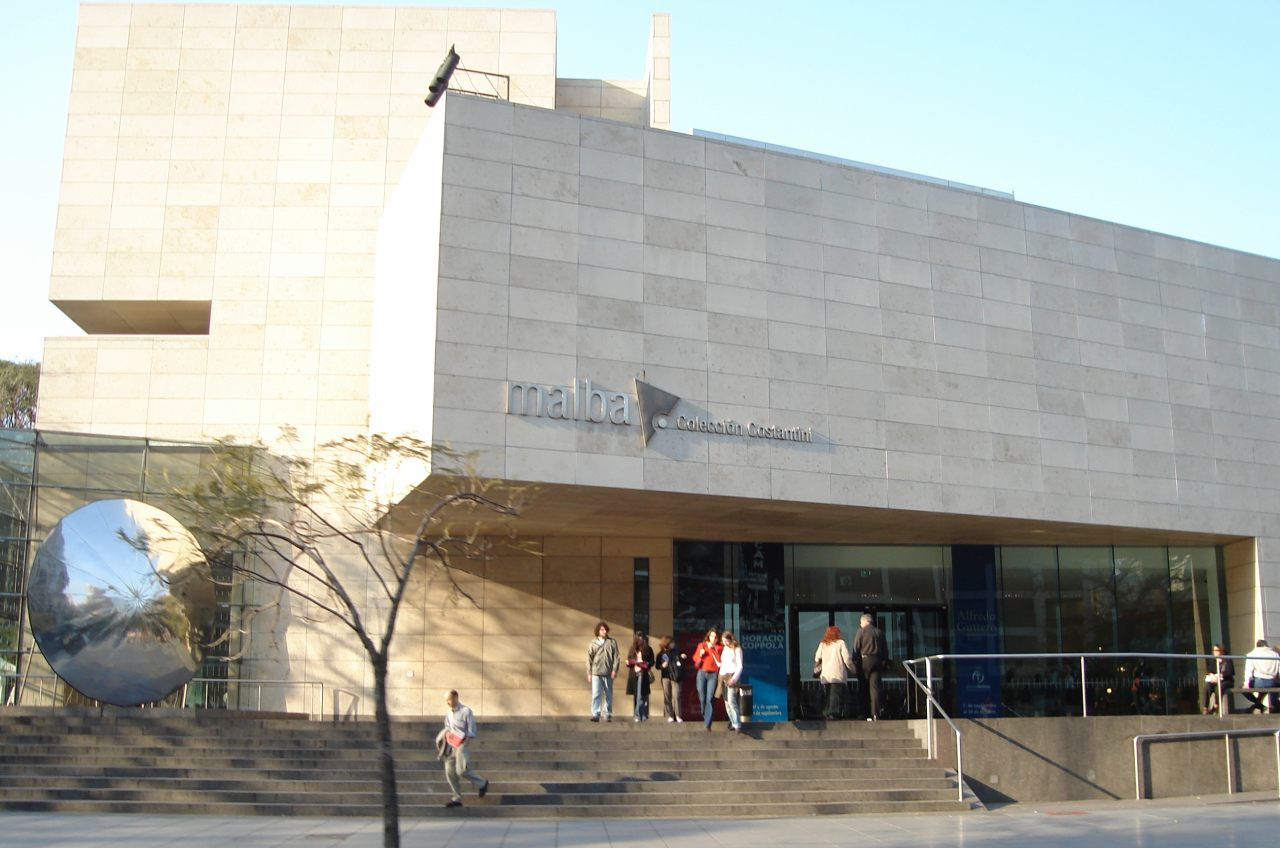
- Established: September 20, 2001
- Location: Palermo, Buenos Aires, Argentina
- Type: Latin American art (20th century–present)
- Collection size: Costantini Collection
- President: Eduardo Costantini
- Curator: Marcelo E. Pacheco
- Website: malba.org.ar

The Latin American Art Museum of Buenos Aires (Spanish: Museo de Arte Latinoamericano de Buenos Aires, mostly known for its acronym MALBA) is an art museum located on Figueroa Alcorta Avenue, in the Palermo section of Buenos Aires.

== History ==
Created by Argentine businessman Eduardo Costantini, the museum is operated by the not-for-profit Fundación MALBA – Costantini, and was inaugurated on September 21, 2001.

The institution was organized around the Costantini Collection, and has continued to expand its selection of works from modern artists across Latin America. It also maintains a cultural center, which stages art and film exhibitions and develops cultural activities. The museum receives over a million visitors annually, and is sustained by over 1,400 active patrons.

The mission of the MALBA is to collect, preserve, research and promote Latin American art from the onset of the 20th century to the present. This involves educating the public about Latin American artists, and the diversity of cultural and artistic holdings in this region.

MALBA—PUERTOS, a satellite space in the town of Escobar opened in 2024.

== Building ==
The museum design was made through an open call contest; 450 proposals from 45 countries were presented. The selection was made by an international jury of architects, and the first prize was awarded to three young Argentinian architects: Gaston Atelman, Martin Fourcade and Alfredo Tapia. The building project was executed by AFT Architects, an Argentine architectural firm. In 1998, Costantini began construction on a large plot on Avenida Figueroa Alcorta.

== Collection ==
Among the collection's highlights is Frida Kahlo's Autorretrato con chango y loro (1942), which in 1995 cost Costantini $3.2 million and which set the record price for Kahlo at the time. Other notable works in the collection include Abaporu (1928) by Tarsila do Amaral, bought in 1995 for almost $1.5 million; Baile en Tehuantepec (1928) by Diego Rivera, for which Costantini paid $15.7 million at Phillips in 2016; and La Grande Dame (The Cat Woman, 1951), a sculpture by Leonora Carrington purchased for $11.3 million in 2024.

In December 2025, it was announced that the MALBA had acquired the Daros Latinamerica Collection, comprising 1,233 works by 117 artists, previously based in Zurich. The acquisition significantly expanded MALBA’s holdings of post-1950 Latin American art and was accompanied by plans to enlarge the museum’s facilities to accommodate the collection.

== Directors ==
- 2000–2002: Agustín Arteaga
- 2014–2018: Agustín Pérez Rubio
- 2019–2021: Gabriela Rangel
- 2024–present: Rodrigo Moura

== Gallery ==
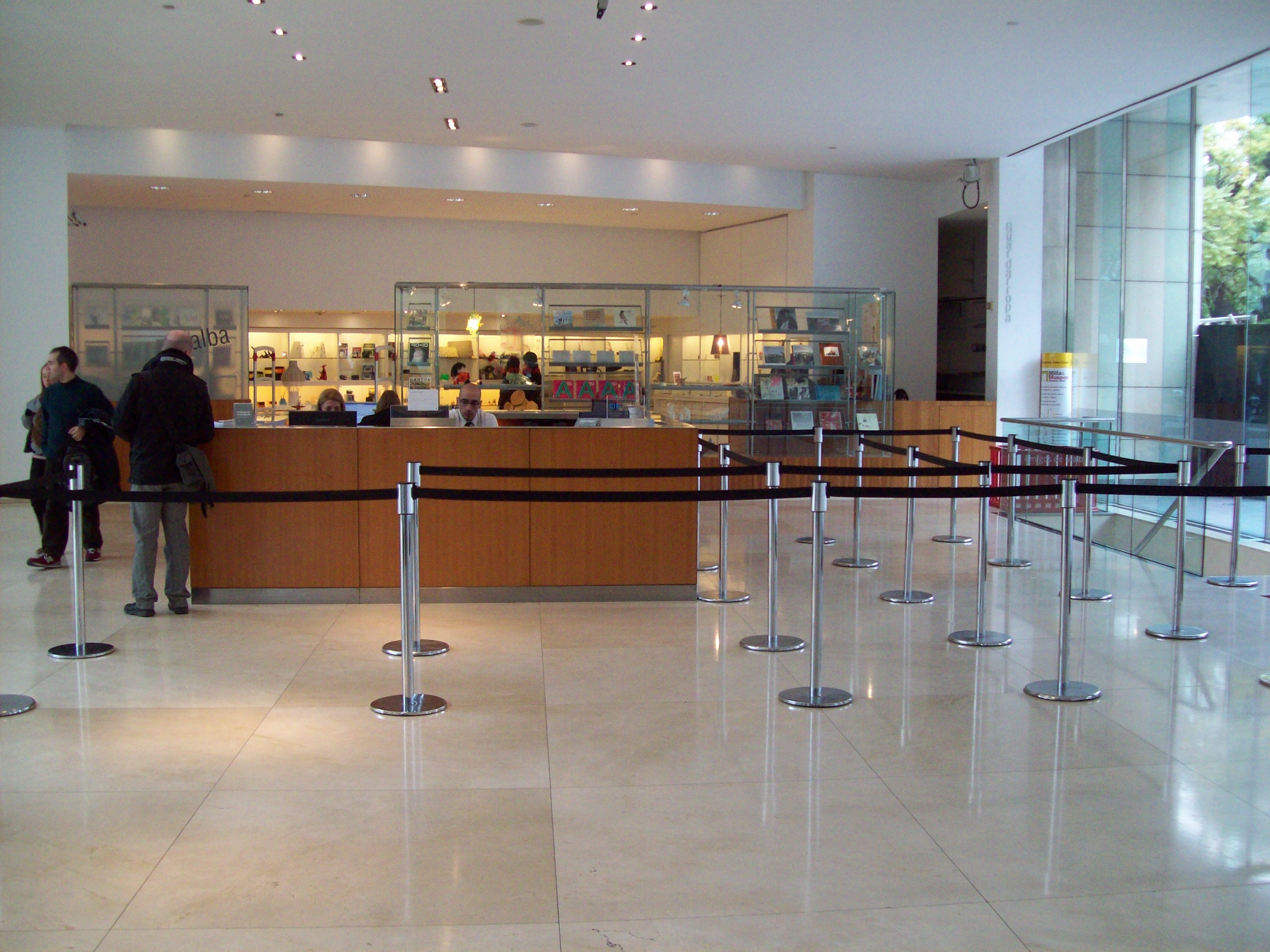

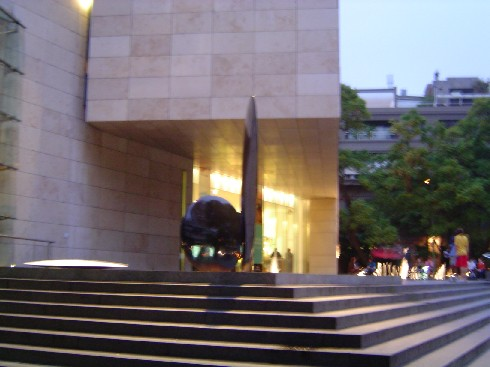

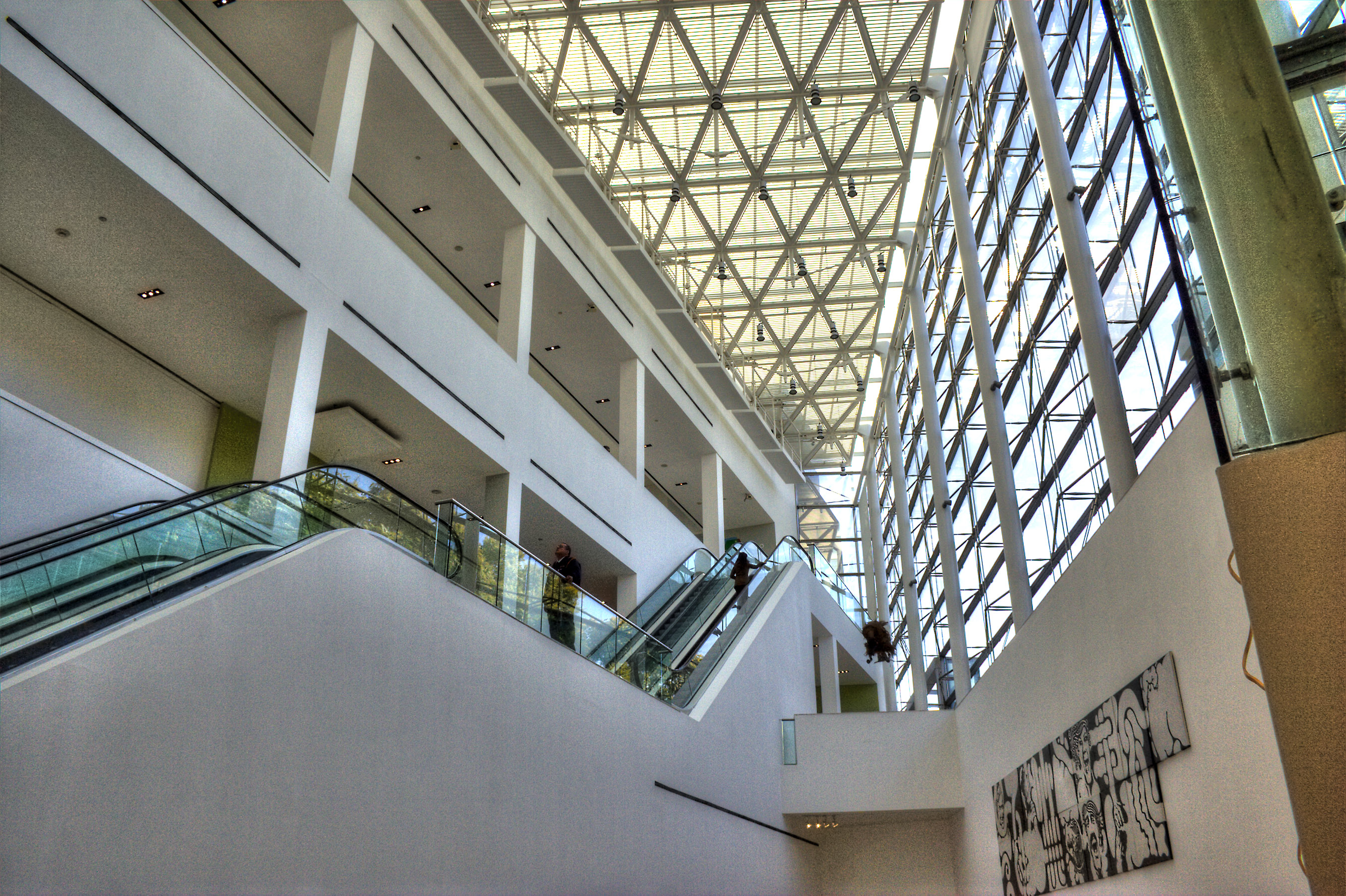

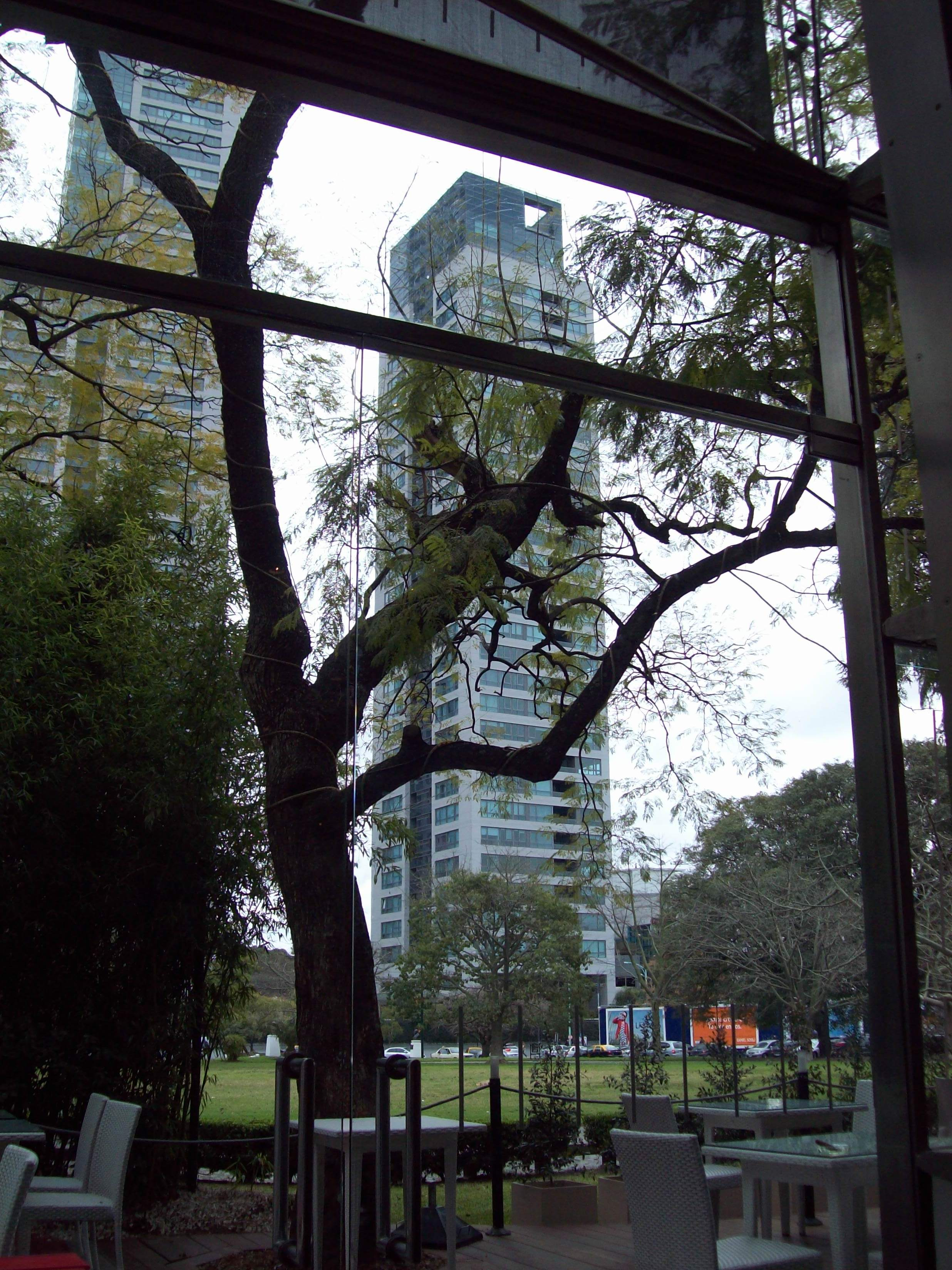
