= Floralis Genérica =

Sculpture in Buenos Aires by Eduardo Catalano

Coordinates: 34°34′54″S 58°23′38″W

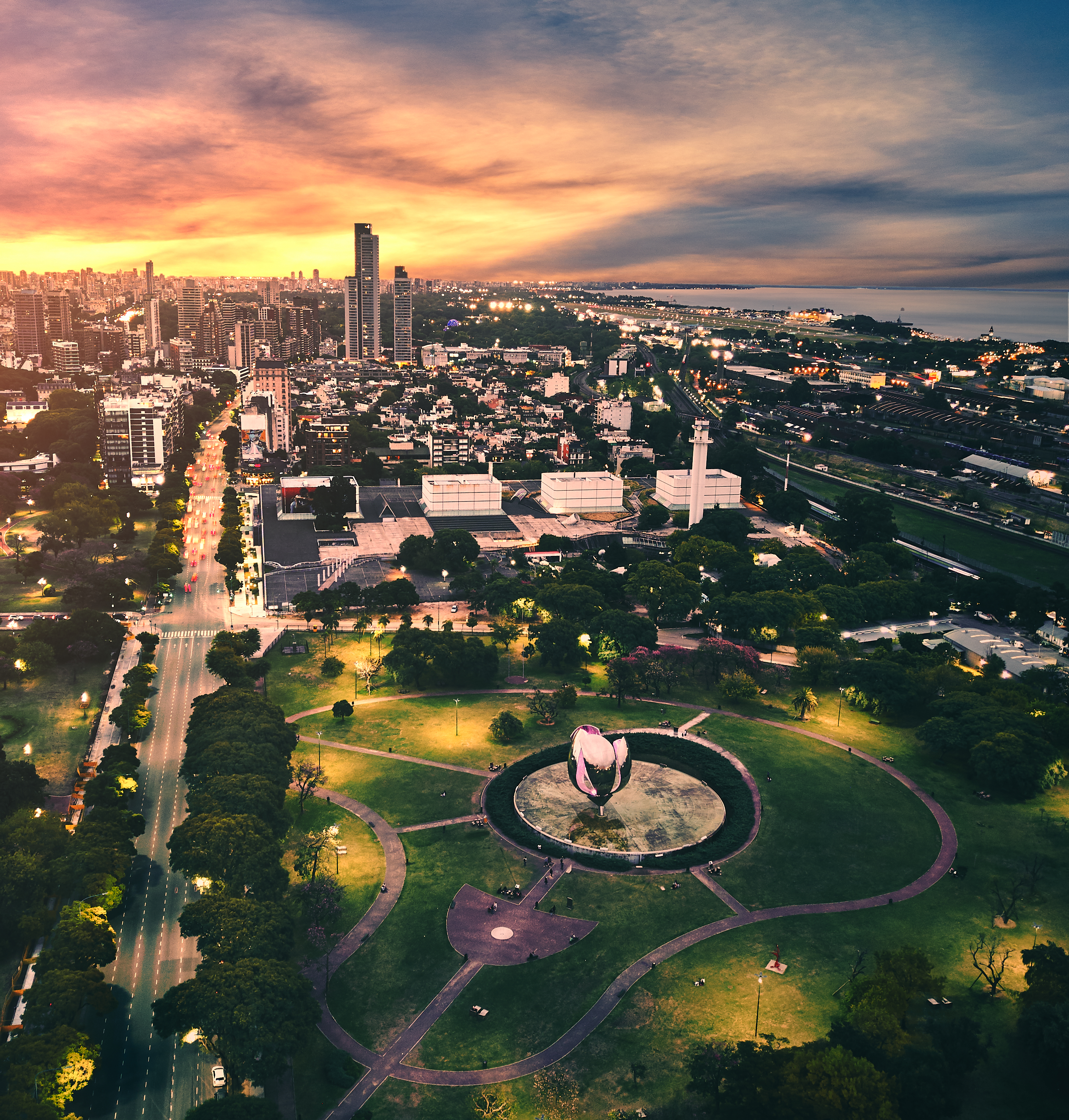
- View of the Palermo Chico ('Little Palermo') section of Buenos Aires, from the southeast. Eduardo Catalano's Floralis Genérica can be seen in the foreground.
- Artist: Eduardo Catalano
- Year: 2002
- Type: Sculpture
- Location: Buenos Aires

Floralis Genérica is a sculpture made of steel and aluminum located in United Nations Square in Buenos Aires, a gift to the city by the Argentine architect Eduardo Catalano. Catalano once said that the flower "is a synthesis of all the flowers and, at the same time, a hope reborn every day at opening." It was created in 2002. The sculpture was designed to move, closing its petals in the evening and opening them in the morning.

The sculpture is located in the center of a park of four acres of wooded boundaries, surrounded by paths that get closer and provide different perspectives of the monument, and placed above a reflecting pool, which apart from fulfilling its aesthetic function, protects it. It represents a large flower made of stainless steel with aluminum skeleton and reinforced concrete, which looks up at the sky, extending to its six petals. It weighs eighteen tons and is 23 m (75 ft) high.

== Opening and closing of the flower ==
One of the characteristics of the flower is an electrical system that automatically opens and closes the petals depending on the time of the day. At night the flower closes, emanating a red glow from inside, and reopens ("...is reborn...") the following morning. This mechanism also closes the flower if strong winds blow.

It opens every morning at 8 and closes at sunset, on a schedule that changes according to the season. When its petals were inaugurated, they didn't close due to technical problems which were solved two months later.

There are four special nights in which the petals are open: May 25, September 21, December 24 and December 31.

According to Eduardo Catalano, the author, Floralis "means belonging to the flora and therefore the flowers", and Genérica "from the concept of "gender" and indicates that it represents all the flowers in the world".

The electronics employed in opening and closing the flower were disabled in 2010 to prevent damaging the sculpture, and it remained permanently open until 2015. This was due to the fact that one of the petals was incorrectly installed during its assembly, as noted by Catalano himself. The company responsible for its construction, Lockheed Martin Aircraft Argentina, provided a 25-year warranty, but as the company was nationalized in 2009 its repair was delayed. The mechanism was functional again by June 2015.

In the early hours of December 17, 2023, parts of the sculpture (including two main petals) fell due to a strong storm.

== Measurements ==
- 23 m (75 ft) high
- Diameter:
  - Petals closed: 26 m (85 ft)
  - Petals open: 32 m (105 ft)
- Diameter of the reflecting pool: 44 m (144 ft)
