= Catalano House =

House in Raleigh, North Carolina

The Eduardo Catalano House was built in 1954 in Raleigh, North Carolina by Eduardo Catalano, a young Argentinian architect. The Catalano house design was highly publicized as the "House of the Decade" by House and Home Magazine in the 1950s and was noted for its modern architecture, later becoming an icon of American mid-century optimism and praised by the rarely praising architect Frank Lloyd Wright.

The 1,700-square-foot (160 m^{2}) three-bedroom house featured a 4,000-square-foot (370 m^{2}) roof which was a hyperbolic paraboloid, built of wood 2.5" thick. The roof was warped into two structural curves (similar to the shape of a shoehorn), with two corners of the roof firmly anchored to the ground and two corners soaring high into the air. Sheltered beneath the double-twisted roof is a square interior enclosed entirely in glass. The undulation of the roof provided openness in some areas and privacy and seclusion in others.

Like most modernist houses in Raleigh, it was built by Frank Walser. The Catalano House was sometimes referred to as the "Potato Chip" house because of the swooping hyperbolic paraboloid roof.

Catalano sold it to engineer Ezra Meir and his wife Violet in September 1957. The Meirs sold it to William and Betsy Hinnant in December 1966. The Hinnants sold it to Raleigh attorney Arch E. Lynch Jr. in May 1978. Lynch lived there until approximately 1996. From 1996 to 2001, the house was unoccupied. Vandals, storms, lack of heat, and neglect made the house rapidly deteriorate. The roof rotted in sections over time. It would have taken several hundred thousand dollars to repair if repair were even possible. Eventually the damage was too extensive to repair.

Preservation North Carolina bought an option on the house and tried unsuccessfully to sell it for $360,000 to anyone who would rebuild the same design. Lynch eventually sold it to JBar Associates in March 2001. The house was destroyed later that month. JBar later built two large houses on the property.

Shortly after its destruction, Catalano unsuccessfully lobbied the NC Museum of Art to have just the roof rebuilt on their grounds in Raleigh. In early 2005, he proposed North Carolina State University with a gift of $1.5M to rebuild the roof as part of a Central Campus Pavilion plan but strong faculty opposition caused him to withdraw, despite the fact NCSU hired an architectural firm to evaluate seven other alternative sites.
