= Eduardo Costantini =

Argentine billionaire businessman

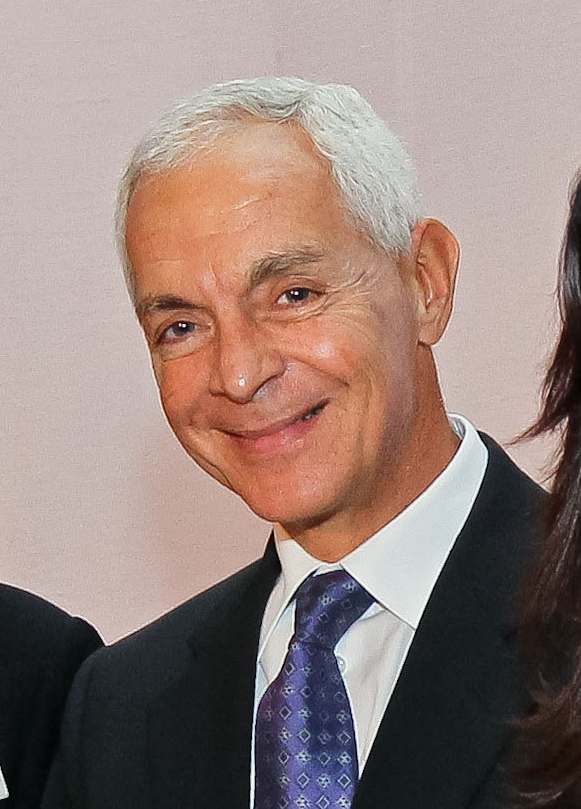
- Born: Eduardo Francisco Costantini; September 17, 1946 (age 79); Buenos Aires, Argentina
- Education: Pontifical Catholic University of Argentina; University of East Anglia
- Occupations: CEO, Consultatio
- Spouse(s): María Teresa Costantini (1966-1994); Elina Costantini (m. 2020)
- Children: 8

Eduardo Francisco Costantini (born September 17, 1946) is an Argentine real estate developer and businessman and the founder and chairman of the Museum of Latin American Art of Buenos Aires (MALBA). As of September 2024, Forbes estimated his net worth at US$1.6 billion.

== Early life ==
Costantini was born in Buenos Aires in 1946. He is one of seven children from a middle-class family. He earned a bachelor's degree in economics from Universidad Católica Argentina in 1971, and a master's degree in quantitative economics from the University of East Anglia in England in 1975.

== Career ==
He was controller of Penta S.A. (1970–1972) and then its finance director (1973–1974). Between 1975 and 1977 he was a member of the board of Huancayo S.A. During the 1980s, he became a stockbroker and then president of Consultatio Bursátil SA. Between 1991 and 1994 he was the vice-president of Banco Francés del Río de la Plata. In 1991, he also founded Consultatio Asset Management, a company exclusively devoted to managing investment funds mainly in Latin America. That same year he founded Consultatio SA, a company devoted to the development of large real estate projects.

Through this company he would develop Nordelta, the largest real estate venture in Argentina. Built in 1999, Nordelta is located in Tigre, 30 km away from Buenos Aires city center. It stretches over 1,700 hectares, has a population of 35,000, with two medical centers, five schools, a mall with over 100 stores and five movie theaters, a sports club, an 18-hole golf course designed by Jack Nicklaus, several restaurants, two gas stations and a five-star hotel.

In 2010 Consultatio SA developed Puertos in Escobar, Buenos Aires province, conceived as an ecological urbanization project of 1,400 hectares with its own biological corridor with native species of plants and animals.

With Consultatio SA, Costantini erected many buildings in Buenos Aires, including Catalinas Plaza (1995), Alem Plaza (1998), the Grand Bourg Tower and the corporate tower Catalinas Norte, which was under construction as of 2016, placed on the last available site of the Catalinas area in Retiro at Puerto Madero's northern entrance.

Costantini had carried out real estate projects outside Argentina. He built Las Garzas complex in Rocha, Uruguay, where he also invested 10 million dollars in the construction of the circular bridge –designed by Rafael Viñoly- that connects the departments of Rocha and Maldonado.

In 2009 he founded at the United States, Consultatio Real Estate, responsible of the development of Oceana Key Biscayne – a complex of exclusive apartments and villas facing the sea- and Oceana Bal Harbour, which will be finished at the end of 2016. Both projects are placed in Miami and will include works by artists including Jeff Koons.

== MALBA art museum ==
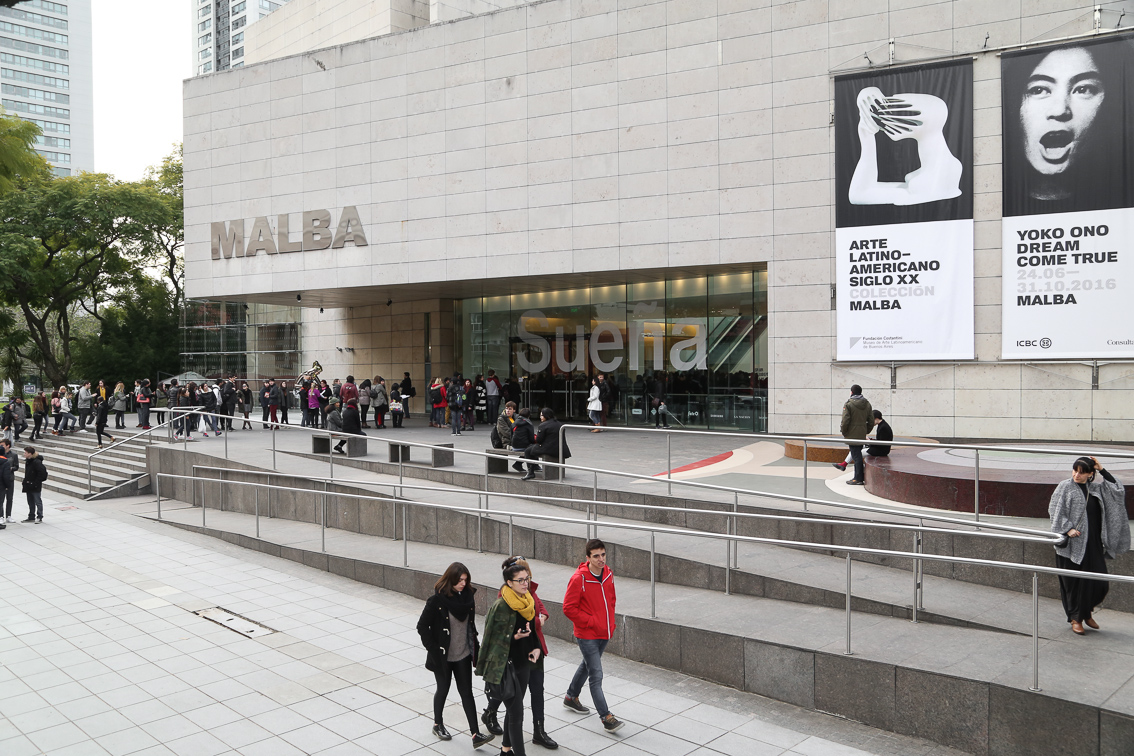
Facade of the MALBA

In 1995, he founded the Eduardo F. Costantini Foundation with the purpose of promoting cultural and educational activities in Buenos Aires. In September 2001 he donated over 220 Latin American artworks to open MALBA, Museo de Arte Latinoamericano de Buenos Aires (Museum of Latin American Art of Buenos Aires). This is a private non-profit institution with over 600 works on exhibit by modern and contemporary artists of the region, such as Frida Kahlo, Diego Rivera, Remedios Varo, Tarsila do Amaral, Wifredo Lam, Xul Solar, Joaquín Torres-García, Emilio Pettorutti, Cándido Portinari and Antonio Berni.

At present, the museum mixes its permanent collection with temporary exhibits, cinema and literature programs and educational activities.

Costantini Foundation covers the deficit of the museum, about $3 million per year.

As art collector and promoter, he is member of the international advisory board of São Paulo Art Biennial Foundation. He also was Chairman Council at the Museum of Modern Art (MoMA) of New York City, member of the advisory committee of the David Rockefeller Center of Latin American Studies at Harvard University and founder member of the global philanthropist circle, Synergos Institute, New York.

== Awards ==
In 2008, he received a Konex Award, merit diploma as “Media and service businessman” and MALBA was recognized as the best cultural entity of the last decade.

In 2011, he was awarded with the Order of Rio Branco (Commander Rank) for his contribution to the dissemination of Brazilian culture.

In 2014, he was distinguished by Endeavor Foundation as ‘Business Role Model’ for his values, track record and commitment to innovation. That same year he received the award for the best 2014 developer for his Catalinas Norte project in Puerto Madero from the Association of Professors and Directors of Real Estate (APPI).

In April 2016, he received the award of Business Track Record from Ernst & Young Entrepreneur of the Year.

In February 2017, Spanish ARCO Foundation awarded him with the "A" Prize for the artistic value of his collection.

== Personal life ==
Costantini used to be married to the actress María Teresa Costantini from 1966 until their divorce in 1994.

Costantini has 8 children, and lives in Uruguay.

In February 2020, aged 73, he married Elina Fernandez.
