= Dom-Ino House =

Modular concrete building model

- Drawing of the Maison Dom-Ino

General information
- Location: Unlocated
- Completed: 1914-15

Design and construction
- Architect: Le Corbusier

Dom-Ino House (French: Maison Dom-Ino) is an open floor plan modular structure designed by the pioneering architect Le Corbusier in 1914–1915. This design became the foundation for most of his architecture for the next ten years.

== History ==
The Maison Dom-ino was a constructional system prototype for the mass production of refugee housing units during World War I that Le Corbusier developed in response to the German invasion of Belgium in 1914. The name is a pun that combines an allusion to domus (Latin for house) and the pieces of the game of dominoes, because the floor plan resembled the game and because the units could be aligned in a series like dominoes, to make row houses of different patterns.

== Design ==
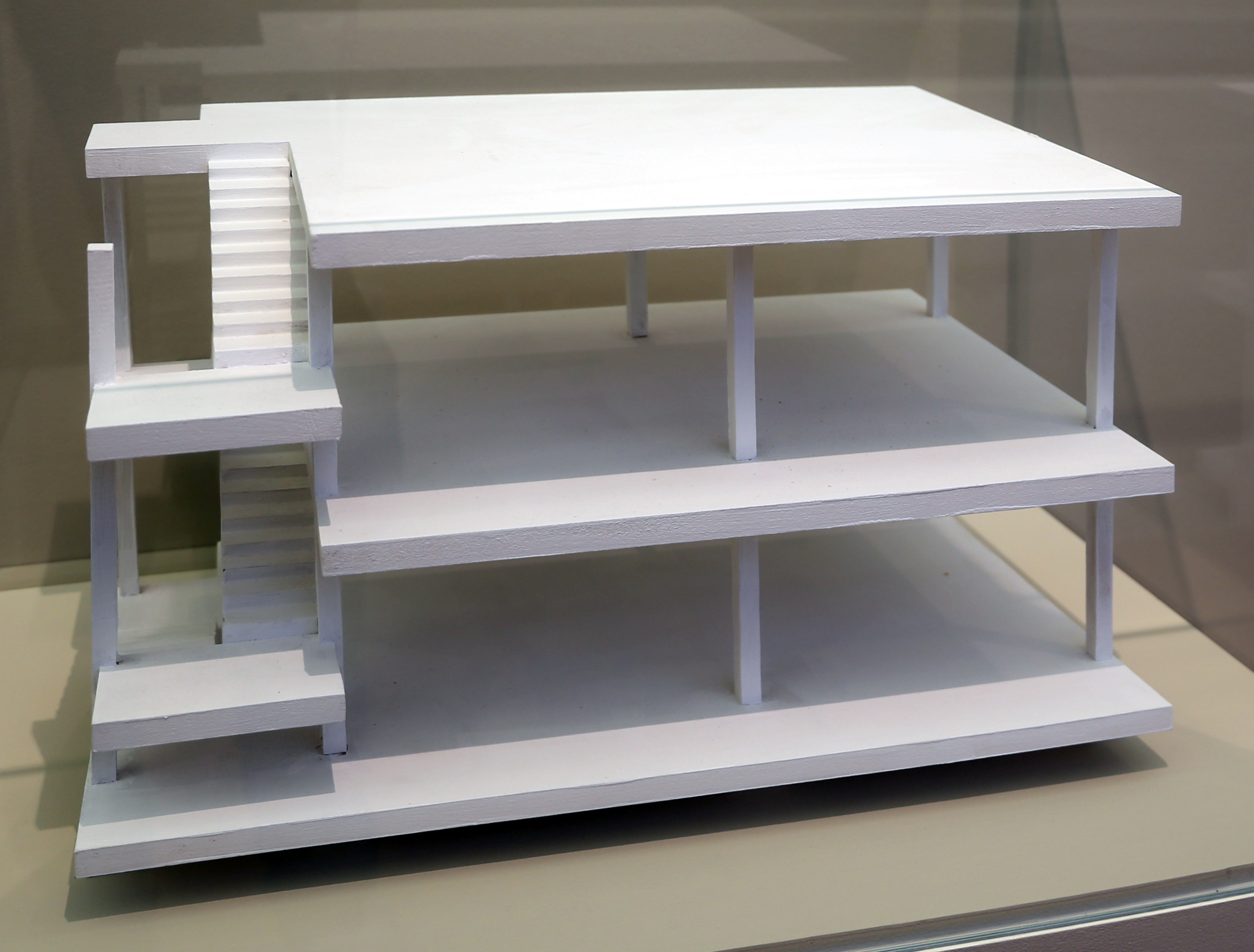
Model of the Dom-Ino House

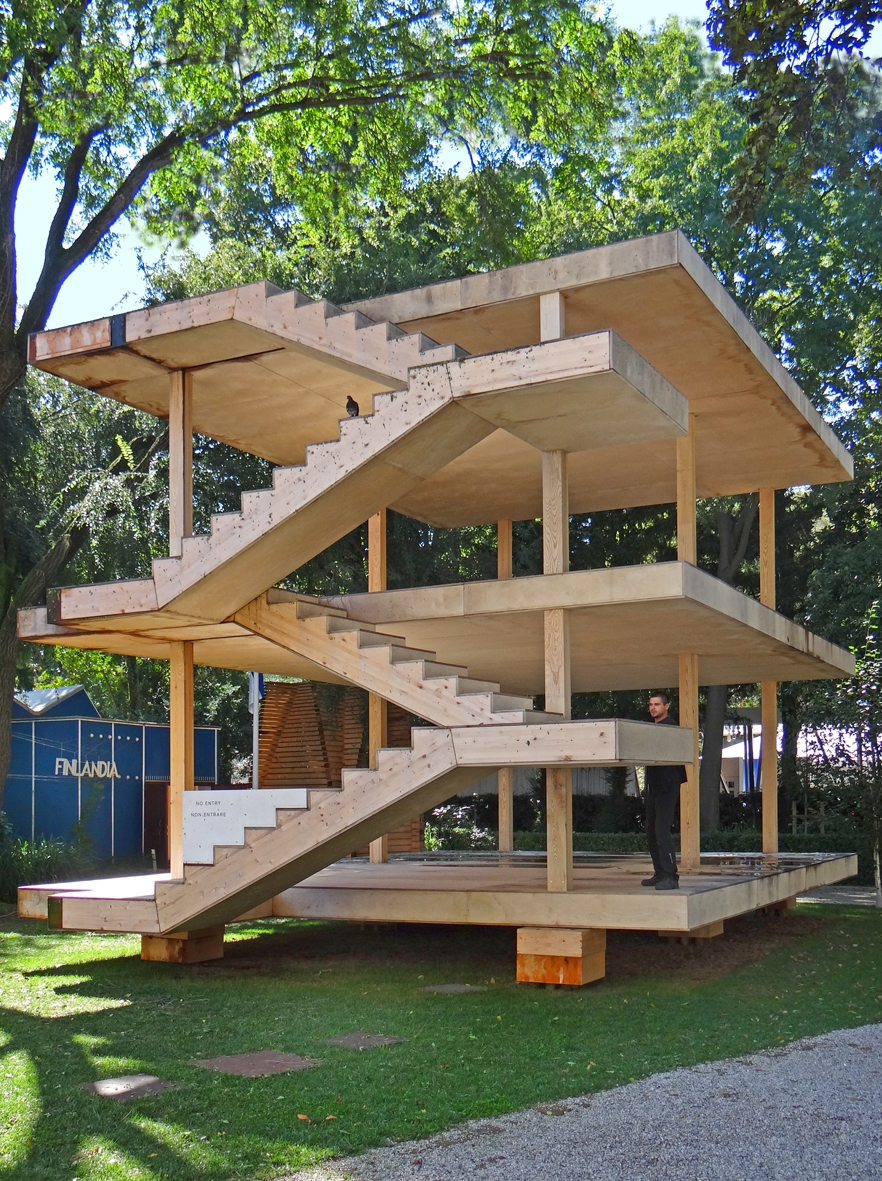
Full Dom-Ino house constructed for the 2014 Venice Biennale of Architecture

This model proposed an free floor plan consisting of concrete floor slabs supported by a minimal number of thin, reinforced concrete columns around the edges, with a stairway providing access to each level on one side of the floor plan. The frame(s) was to be completely independent of the floor plans of the houses thus giving freedom to design the interior configuration. The model eliminated load-bearing walls and the supporting beams for the ceiling.

In the first volume of his Œuvre complète (1929), Le Corbusier specifies leaving the choice of the size and layout of the frame(s) to inhabitants. The determination of the formal arrangement of building elements (footings, columns, floor slabs, stairs, infill) would thus be deferred beyond the architect as traditionally conceived according to the Renaissance ideal. This gives grounds for Le Corbusier's vision to be considered as one of the first modernist architectural projects, in that it marks a radical departure from that previous tradition: inhabitants, rather than the architect, would motivate the process of the becoming of architecture. The architect would simply develop the possibility for that becoming. In this way, the Maison Dom-ino prefigures the Open Form approach (1958) that Polish architect Oskar Hansen would promulgate in the second half of the twentieth century, elaborating the modernist essence of Le Corbusier's vision into a comprehensive theoretical, design, and pedagogical program.

== See also ==
- Glass House
- Farnsworth House
