= Eduardo Catalano =

Argentine architect

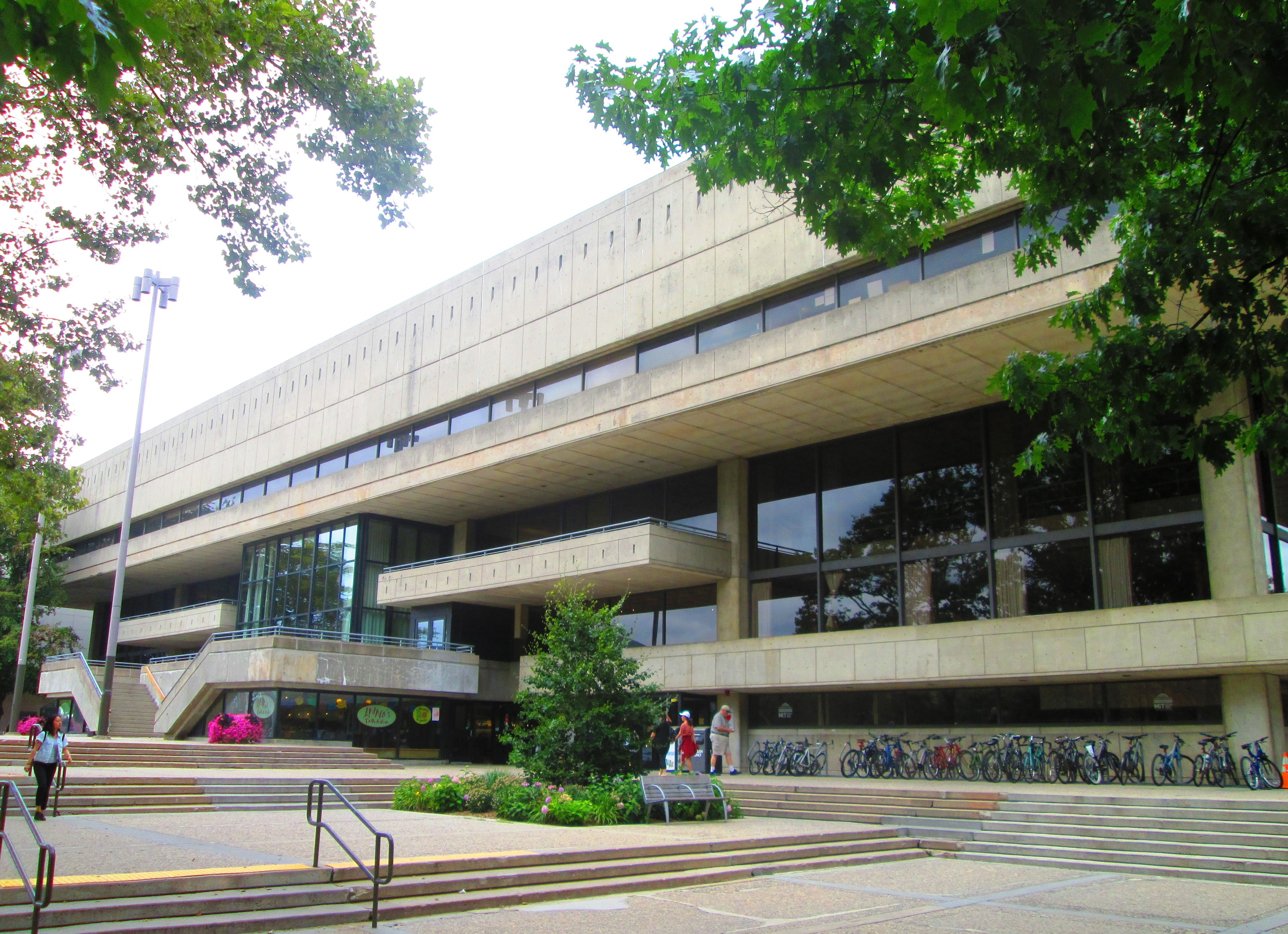
Eduardo Catalano: MIT Stratton Student Center, 1968, Massachusetts Institute of Technology, Cambridge, Massachusetts

Eduardo Fernando Catalano (December 19, 1917 – January 28, 2010) was an Argentine architect.

== Life and career ==
Born in Buenos Aires, Catalano went to the United States on a scholarship to the University of Pennsylvania and Harvard Graduate School of Design. In 1945, after earning his second master's degree in architecture returned to Buenos Aires where he taught at the University of Buenos Aires and ran a private practice. Catalano then taught at the Architectural Association in London from 1950 to 1951, when he came back to the United States as a Professor of Architecture at the School of Design in Raleigh, North Carolina State University. In 1956 he began teaching in the graduate program for MIT, until 1977, when he moved on "to discover and participate in other endeavors as rewarding as teaching".

Catalano had an "understanding of the indivisible relationship between space and structure", which earned him praise from Frank Lloyd Wright, who wrote to House and Home magazine when he saw the publishing of the "Raleigh House" AKA the Catalano House to say "It is refreshing to see that the shelter, which is the most important element in domestic architecture, has been so imaginatively and skillfully treated as in the house by Eduardo Catalano". Catalano sold the house when he moved to Cambridge, Massachusetts to teach at MIT. Years of neglect at the end of the 20th century culminated in the house's demolition in 2001.

Other buildings designed by Catalano include the US embassies in Buenos Aires, Argentina and in Pretoria, South Africa, the Juilliard School of Music at New York City's Lincoln Center, Guilford County Courthouse in Greensboro, North Carolina, and the Stratton Student Center at MIT in Cambridge, Massachusetts. (Catalano designed the Guilford County-Greensboro Government Center, not to be confused with the Guilford County Courthouse, designed by Harry Barton from 1918 to 1920.)

The Catalano House, built in 1954 and which Catalano is best known for, was designed using a hyperbolic paraboloid roof. Here is a picture of the original House. The roof of the house, a curved structure that is built from straight elements (tongue and groove boarding) evolved from his studies on geometric and structural properties of hyperbolic paraboloids. These studies, which included testing of new materials like aluminum and thin-shell concrete, were published by the University of North Carolina in Structures of Warped Surface.

Eduardo Catalano also created the environmental kinetic sculpture Floralis Genérica in Palermo, Buenos Aires.

== Architectural works ==
Year	Building	Address	City	State	Notes	Image	Reference
1948	Ariston Club		Mar del Plata	Buenos Aires (Argentina)	In association with Marcel Breuer and Carlos Coire		
1953	House for B. Richard Jackson	1317 Westfield Ave	Raleigh	North Carolina			
1954	House for Eduardo Catalano		Raleigh	North Carolina	Sold by Catalano in 1957, and ultimately demolished in 2001.		
1958	Juilliard School of Music	60 Lincoln Center Plaza	New York	New York	In association with consulting architect Pietro Belluschi and supervising architect Helge Westermann. Remodeled in 2009 under the direction of Diller Scofidio + Renfro and FXFOWLE.		
1960	Burton-Conner House, Massachusetts Institute of Technology	410 Memorial Dr	Cambridge	Massachusetts	Addition of the Porter Room, a student commons, to a preexisting apartment building.		
1961	Julius Adams Stratton Building, Massachusetts Institute of Technology	84 Massachusetts Ave	Cambridge	Massachusetts			
1961	Technology Square	Technology Sq	Cambridge	Massachusetts	In association with consulting architect Pietro Belluschi.		
1962	Faculty of Exact and Natural Sciences, University of Buenos Aires	Ciudad Universitaria	Buenos Aires	Argentina	In association with architect Horacio Caminos.		
1963	Grover M. Hermann Building, Massachusetts Institute of Technology	30 Wadsworth St	Cambridge	Massachusetts			
1965	Eastgate, Massachusetts Institute of Technology	60 Wadsworth St	Cambridge	Massachusetts			
1965	Faculty of Architecture, Design and Urbanism, University of Buenos Aires	Ciudad Universitaria	Buenos Aires	Argentina	In association with architect Horacio Caminos.		
1966	Tower Square	1500 Main St	Springfield	Massachusetts	In association with consulting architect Pietro Belluschi.		
1966	Fiorello H. LaGuardia High School	100 Amsterdam Ave	New York	New York	In association with consulting architect Pietro Belluschi and supervising architect Helge Westermann.		
1967	Central Plaza	675 Massachusetts Ave	Cambridge	Massachusetts			
1968	Springfield Civic Center	1277 Main St	Springfield	Massachusetts	In association with consulting architect Pietro Belluschi. Remodeled in 2003 and renamed the MassMutual Center.		
1969	Boston Public Library, Charlestown Branch	179 Main St	Boston	Massachusetts			
1970	Embassy of the United States	Av Colombia 4300	Buenos Aires	Argentina			
1970	Gorton Corporation Headquarters	128 Rogers St	Gloucester	Massachusetts			
1970	Guilford County-Greensboro Government Center	201 S Eugene St	Greensboro	North Carolina			
1971	Hampden County Hall of Justice	50 State St	Springfield	Massachusetts	Now known as the Roderick L. Ireland Courthouse.		
1972	One Washington Mall	1 Washington St	Boston	Massachusetts			
1975	Cumberland County Civic Center	1 Civic Center Sq	Portland	Maine	Now known as the Cross Insurance Arena.		
1977	Additions to Cambridge Rindge and Latin School	459 Broadway	Cambridge	Massachusetts	Addition of wing along Cambridge Street.		
1980	House for Eduardo Catalano	44 Grozier Rd	Cambridge	Massachusetts			
1982	Embassy of the United States		Pretoria	South Africa			
2002	Floralis Genérica, Plaza de las Naciones Unidas		Buenos Aires	Argentina			

== Publications ==
- Gubitosi, Camillo, and Izzo, Alberto, Eduardo Catalano - buildings and projects, Catalogue of the Exhibition held in Naples, 1978.
- Catalano, Eduardo. Structure and Geometry, Cambridge Architectural Press, 1986.
- Catalano, Eduardo. the constant - dialogues on architecture in black and white, Cambridge Architectural Press, 2000.
