= List of Le Corbusier buildings =

This list of Le Corbusier buildings categorizes the work of the architect.

Name	City	State/ Country	Designed	Completed	Other Information	Image
Villa Fallet	La Chaux-de-Fonds	Switzerland	1905	1906	heritage listed	Villa Fallet
Villa Stotzer	6, Chemin de Pouillerel La Chaux-de-Fonds	Switzerland	1907	1908	heritage listed	
Villa Jacquemet	La Chaux-de-Fonds	Switzerland	1908	1908		
Villa Jeanneret-Perret	La Chaux-de-Fonds	Switzerland	1912	1912	heritage listed	Villa Jeanneret-Perret
Villa Favre-Jacot	near La Chaux-de-Fonds	Switzerland	1912		Le Locle	
Villa Schwob	La Chaux-de-Fonds	Switzerland	1916	1916	heritage listed	Villa Schwob
Scala Cinema	La Chaux-de-Fonds	Switzerland	1916	1916	Rue de la Serre	
Water tower	Les Landes		1917	1917		
Château d'eau of Château Chavat	Podensac	France		1917	heritage listed	
Villa Besnus (Ker-Ka-Ré)	Paris	France	1922	1922	completely altered	
Ozenfant House and Studio	Paris	France		1922	heritage listed (1975)	
Villa Le Lac	Corseaux	Switzerland		1923	heritage listed; World Heritage Site (2016)	
Villa La Roche	Paris	France	1923	1925	heritage listed (1996); World Heritage Site (2016)	
Villa Jeanneret	Paris	France	1923	1925	World Heritage Site (2016)	
Pavillon de L'Esprit Nouveau	Paris	France	1924	1924	destroyed; replica built in 1977 in Bologna, Italy	Pavillon L'Esprit Nouveau
Maisons Lipchitz & Miestschaninoff	Boulogne-sur-Seine, Paris	France	1923	1924	House and studio	
Studio Miestschaninoff	Boulogne-sur-Seine	France	1923	1924	Artists studio attached to Maison Lipchitz	
Tonkin House	Bordeaux	France	1924	1924	Extension to existing house	
Housing at Lege	Bordeaux	France	1924			
Cité Frugès	Pessac	France	1924	1926	World Heritage Site (2016)	Cité Frugès, Pessac 08
Planeix House	24 bis, Boulevard Masséna, Paris	France	1925	1928	heritage listed (1976)	
Villa Cook	Boulogne-sur-Seine	France	1926	1926	described by L-C as'La vraie maison cubique' or The true cubic house.	
Cite de Peuple	Paris 75013	France	1926	1926	Salvation Army hostel	
Maison Guiette / Les Peupliers	Antwerp	Belgium	1926	1926	House and studio for Rene Guilette; World Heritage Site (2016)	
Villa Ternisien	5, Allee des Pins, Boulogne-sur-Seine, Paris	France		1926	The remains of this building can be clearly seen today beneath the four-storey block which was built over it. Demolished 1935	Villa Ternisien, 1926.
Villa Stein / Les Terraces	Garches, Paris	France	1926	1927	heritage listed (1975)	
Pavilion de l'Esprit Nouveau	Paris	France	1926	1926	Demolished soon afterwards	
Two Villas at Weissenhof Estate	Stuttgart	Germany		1927	World Heritage Site (2016)	Villa Le Corbusier, Weissenhof
Villa Savoye	Poissy-sur-Seine, France	France	1928	1931	heritage listed (1965); World Heritage Site (2016)	Villa Savoye
gate lodge at Villa Savoye	Poissy-sur-Seine	France	1928	1931	Heritage listed (1965) World heritage site (2016)	minimal house by le Corbusier
Tsentrosoyuz	Moscow	Soviet Union	1928	1933		Viewfrom Miasnitskaia Street
Villa Baizeau	Tunis	Tunisia	1928	1930		
Maison Church	Paris	France	1928		Demolished	
Cité du Refuge of the Armée du Salut	Paris	France	1929	1933		
Salvation Army floating dormatory	River Seine Paris	France	1929	1929		
Pavillon Suisse	Cité Universitaire, Paris	France	1930	1932		Swiss students hostel at Cite Universitaire
Maison Errazuriz	Zapallar	Chile		1930		
Immeuble Clarté	Geneva	Switzerland	1930	1932	heritage listed (1986); World Heritage Site (2016)	Immeuble Clarté, Geneva
Charles de Beistegui penthouse apartment	Paris	France	1930	1930		
Immeuble Molitor	24, rue Nungessor & Coli, 75016 Paris	France	1931	1934	Apartment building with similar facades to two streets. Contains le Corbusier's own apartment; World Heritage Site (2016)	
Villa Le Sextant	Marennes	France	1935			
Young Mans Apartment	Brussels	Belgium	1935			
Weekend house	La Celle St Cloud	France	1934	1935		
Palace of Ministry of National Education and Public Health	Rio de Janeiro	Brazil	1936	1945	(as a consultant to Lucio Costa, Oscar Niemeyer and others)	
Pavilion des Temps Nouveau	Paris	France	1937		demolished	
Usine Claude et Duval	Saint-Dié-des-Vosges	France	1946	1946	World Heritage Site (2016)	
Unité d'Habitation	Marseille	France	1945	1952	World Heritage Site (2016)	
Currutchet House	La Plata	Argentina	1949	1953	National Historic Monument of Argentina; World Heritage Site (2016)	Curutchet House
Holiday huts	Cap Martin	France				
United Nations headquarters	New York City	United States		1952	(Consultant)	United Nations headquarters
Chapelle Notre Dame du Haut	Ronchamp	France	1950	1955	World Heritage Site (2016)	Notre Dame du Haut
Maison des Pelerins	Ronchamp	France	1950		hostel to the above.	
Cabanon de vacances	Roquebrune-Cap-Martin	France	1949	1951	With Jacques Michel, Jean Prouve and Charles Berberis; World Heritage Site (2016)	Cabanon de vacances
Work shack	Cap Martin	France	1954	1954	A small workroom at end of path beside the Cabanon	
Maisons Jaoul	Neuilly-sur-Seine	France	1951	1954	heritage listed (1966)	Maisons Jaoul
Mill Owners' Association Building	Ahmedabad	India	1951	1956		Mill Owners' Association Building
Bhakra Dam	Himalayas	India	1955			
Villa Sarabhai	Ahmedabad	India	1955	1956		
Villa Shodhan	Ahmedabad	India	1951	1956		Model of Villa Shodhan
Sanskar Kendra Museum	Ahmedabad	India	1951	1956		
Palace of Justice / High Court	Chandigarh	India	1951	1959	World Heritage Site (2016)	Punjab and Haryana High Court
Museum and Art Gallery	Chandigarh	India	1952	1968		Museum and Gallery of Art, Chandigarh
Secretariat Building	Chandigarh	India	1953	1953	World Heritage Site (2016)	Secretariat Building, Chandigarh
Governor's Palace	Chandigarh	India	1953		unbuilt	
Legislative Assembly / Palace of Assembly	Chandigarh	India	1956	1964	World Heritage Site (2016)	Palace of Assembly
Sector 17 Central Business Area	Chandigarh	India	1961	1969		
Unité d'Habitation of Nantes-Rezé	Nantes	France	1953	1955	heritage listed (2001)	Unité d'Habitation of Nantes-Rezé
Unité d'Habitation of Briey	Briey en Forêt	France	1956	1957	heritage listed (1993)	
National Museum of Western Art	Tokyo	Japan	1957	1959	World Heritage Site (2016)	National Museum of Western Art
Maison du Brésil	Cité Universitaire, Paris	France	1952	1959	heritage listed (1985) with Louis Costa	
Unité d'Habitation of Berlin	Charlottenburg, Flatowallee 16, Berlin	Germany	1957	1958	Heritage listed	Unité d'Habitation of Berlin
Unité d'Habitation of Meaux	Meaux	France		1957		
Unite d'Habitation	Briey-en-Foret	France	1957			
Unite de Camping	Cap Martin	France	1957	1957	Small camping hostel adjoining Cabanon	
Philips Pavilion at the 1958 World Exposition	Brussels	Belgium	1958	1958	Iannis Xenakis was assigned to build it	Philips Pavilion
Government College of Art (GCA) and the Chandigarh College of Architecture(CCA)	Chandigarh	India	1950	1959		Chandigarh College of Architecture
monastery of Sainte Marie de La Tourette	near Lyon	France	1957	1959	with Iannis Xenakis; World Heritage Site (2016)	
Center for Electronic Calculus, Olivetti	Milan	Italy		1961		
Carpenter Center for the Visual Arts	Harvard University, Cambridge, Massachusetts	United States	1961	1964		Carpenter Center for the Visual Arts
Unité d'Habitation of Firminy-Vert	Firminy	France	1960	1964	heritage listed (1993)	
Firminy-Vert Stadium	Firminy	France	1965	1966	heritage listed (1984)	
Maison de la Culture de Firminy / Youth Centre	Firminy	France	1961	1965	heritage listed (1984) World Heritage Site (2016)	
Centre Le Corbusier / Heidi Weber Museum	Zurich	Switzerland	1963	1966	heritage listed	Heidi Weber Museum
Club House	Chandigarh	India	1964			
Church of Saint-Pierre, Firminy	Firminy	France	1960	2006	(built posthumously and completed under José Oubrerie's guidance in 2006)	Saint-Pierre
Baghdad Gymnasium	Baghdad	Iraq	1956	1980		

== Le Corbusier Unbuilt Projects ==
These countries are listed in chronological order.

=== Switzerland ===
- 1910 School of arts and crafts, La Chaux-de-Fonds.
- 1914 Dom-ino House (no site agreed).
- 1914 Felix Klipstein house, Loubach.
- 1914 Bank, Neuenburg.
- 1915 Butin bridge, near Geneva (Competition).
- 1916 Watch factory, la Chaux-de-Fonds.
- 1926 League of Nations headquarters, Geneva.
- 1928 Wanner apartment block, Geneva.
- 1929 World Museum, Geneva.
- 1932 Apartment block, Zurichhorn, Zurich.
- 1933 Rentenanstalt building, Zurich.
- 1934 Workers housing, Zurich.
- 1950 Feuter House, Lake Constance.
- 1962 Centre Le Corbusier, Zurich (First version).

=== France ===
- 1914 Norman House, Deauville.
- 1915 House at Lons-sur-Saunier.
- 1916–21 Paul Poiret House.
- 1916 Fritz Zbinden House, Erlach.
- 1916 Administrative building, Le Locle.
- 1917 Abattoir, Challuy and Garchizy.
- 1917 Workers housing, near Dieppe.
- 1917 Dam, l'ile Jourdain.
- 1918 Factory, Saintes.
- 1918 Workers housing.
- 1919 Pre-cast concrete houses, Troyes.
- 1919 Monol Hou1934 Apartment block, Esplanade des Invalides, Paris.
- 1935 Bata works at Hellocourt, Lorraine.ses (no site agreed).
- 1919 Distillery, near Lyons.
- 1920 Citrohan House (1st version) (No site agreed).
- 1921 Garage, Lille.
- 1922 Citrohan House (2nd version) (no site agreed) (exhibition model built).
- 1922 La Roche- Jeanneret houses, Auteuil.
- 1922 Artists house.
- 1924 Weekend house at Rambouillet (exhibition model built).
- 1925 Meyer House, Paris.
- 1925 Housing, Cite Audincourt.
- 1926 Raspail garage, Paris.
- 1926 Cardinet stadium, Paris.
- 1926 Fruges factory.
- 1931 Museum of contemporary arts, Paris.1939 Research Laboratory, Roscoff, France.
- 1935 Apartment block, rue Fabert, Paris.
- 1935 Bastion Kellermann, Paris.
- 1935 Museum, Paris.
- 1936 National Sports Centre, Paris.
- 1936 Bata shops.
- 1937 Monument to Vaillant-Couturier, Villejuif.
- 1937 Jaoul weekend house.
- 1937 Bata pavilion, International exhibition Paris.
- 1939 Sports centre, Vars valley.
- 1940 Murondins housing for war refugees (various sites)
- 1940 Pre-fabricated schools (various sites) (with Jean Prouve).
- 1940 Pre-fabricated housing.
- 1940 Foremans House.
- 1940 Engineers House.
- 1948 Roq & Rob housing, Cap Martin.
- 1950 Museum of endless growth (no specific site).
- 1950 Exhibition Pavilion, Port Mailllot, Paris.
- 1950 Delgado Memorial chapel.
- 1950 Two Unite d'Habitations at Strasbourg.
- 1950 Chastang dam.
- 1957 Five Unite d'Habitation at Meaux.
- 1959 Pre-fabricated housing (with Renault enhineers) (site unknown).
- 1961 Conference centre and hotel, Quai Anatole France.
- 1962 Saint Pierre church, Firmany Vert (first version).
- 1964 Congress Hall, Strasbourg.
- 1965 Museum of the 20th century, Nanterre, Paris

=== Morocco ===
- 1919 Hotel, Rabat.

=== Chile ===
- 1930 Errazuris house, Chile.

=== Russia ===
- 1931 Palace of the Soviets, Moscow (competition).

=== Algeria ===
- 1933 Durand Housing, Algeria.
- 1933 Apartment block, Algiers.
- 1935 Apartment block, Nemours, Algeria.
- 1935 Swimming pool with wave machine, Badjarah, Algeria.
- 1938 Tower for Quartier de la Marine, Algeria.
- 1939 Museum of endless growth, Philippeville, Algeria.
- 1942 Peyrissac House, Cherchal, Algeria

=== Czechoslovakia ===
- 1935 Bata Works at Zlin Valley, Czechoslovakia.

=== United States ===
1935 house for a College president, Chicago, Ill.

1939 Exhibition pavilion, Liege or San Francisco.

=== Brazil ===
1936 University, Rio de Janeiro.

1964 French Embassy, Brasilia.

=== United Kingdom ===
- 1936 Paul Bowlard House, Little Dole, Sussex, UK
- 1939 Ideal Home exhibition pavilion, London.

=== India ===
- 1952 Workers houses, Chandigarh
- 1953 Governors palace, Chandigarh.
- 1956 Prefabricated housing, Lagny (with Jean Prouve).
- 1956 Hospital, Flers.
- 1960 Museum of Knowledge, Chandigarh.
- The place of justice, Chandigarh

=== Iraq ===
1956 Sports Centre, Baghdad.

=== Sweden ===
1962 Ahrenberg Exhibition Pavilion, Stockholm.

=== Germany ===
1963 International Art Centre, Erlenbach, near Frankfurt upon Main.

=== Italy ===
1962 Olivetti Computer Centre, Rho-Milan (first version)

1963 Church, Bologna for Archbishop Lercaro.

1963 Olivetti Computer Centre, Rho-Milan.

1964 Hospital Venice (first version).

1965 Hospital Venice (revised version).
