= Baghdad Gymnasium =

Le Corbusier complex in Baghdad

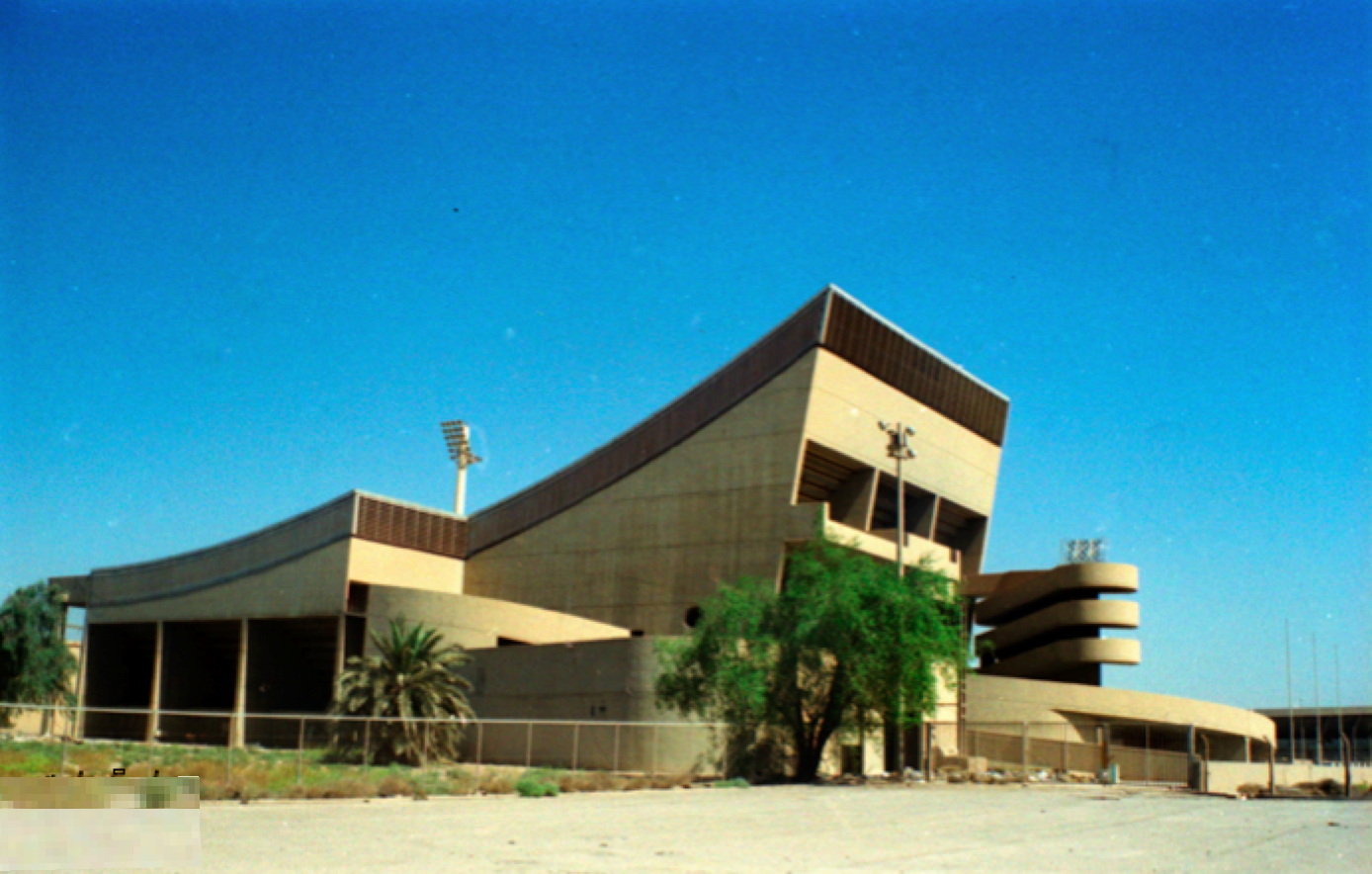
- Interactive map of Baghdad Gymnasium
- Former names: Saddam Hussein Gymnasium
- Location: Baghdad, Iraq
- Coordinates: 33°19′35″N 44°26′16″E
- Capacity: 3,000

Construction
- Groundbreaking: 1978
- Opened: 1980
- Architect: Le Corbusier

Baghdad Gymnasium (Arabic: صالة الجمنازيوم للألعاب الرياضية), formerly the Saddam Hussein Gymnasium, is a sports complex in Baghdad, Iraq adjacent to the al-Sha'ab Stadium. Designed by Le Corbusier under the commission of King Faisal II in 1956 for potential use in the 1960 Summer Olympics. After King Faisal II was overthrown in a military coup in 1958, the project underwent several design and location changes.

Le Corbusier died in 1965, leaving a wealth of drawings and studies for the multi-functions of Baghdad's Sports Complex which included a large stadium, tennis courts, swimming pools, and a gymnasium. Only the latter was finally built between 1978 and 1980, to be inaugurated by and named after Iraq's President Saddam Hussein. The American army troops occupied the Gymnasium as well as al-Sha'ab district for some years following the Fall of Baghdad in 2003.

== Architecture ==
The center is constructed of reinforced concrete. The main roof spans 34 metres and is constructed with a steel truss covered with corrugated aluminum sheets. The trusses are exposed in the interior and house the mechanical ducts. The indoor 3,000 seat stadium and the adjacent open-air amphitheater are linked by an enormous sliding door which, when opened, integrates the two stadia. In addition to organizing basketball, volleyball, tennis, table tennis, fencing, boxing, wrestling, weightlifting, Taekwondo, Judo, and gymnastics competitions and practices, the Gymnasium is host to concerts, meetings and rallies for political parties.

== History ==
During the reign of King Faisal II, Faisal initiated large-scale plans for the modernization of Greater Baghdad. The goal of this ambitious project was to improve and develop infrastructure and housing, provide essential public buildings, reform the building industries, and train future Iraqi architects to not rely on Western help. The King invited many Western architects, among them was Le Corbusier who would go on to design the Baghdad Gymnasium. In 1950, the ministry of Iraqi Prime Minister Nuri al-Said created the Development Board, which was a governmental body tasked with developing new infrastructures throughout Iraq. Le Corbusier wanted to build an Olympic City that included a 50,000 people capacity stadium and what would later become the Gymnasium.

However, due to the overthrow of King Faisal II, the project did not go anywhere until the Presidency of Saddam Hussein where the project was completed just before the Iran-Iraq War with French architect Axel Mesny in charge of the project, and the help of Thai workers. The project didn't conclude with Le Corbusier's signature. Despite being named after Saddam, the President didn't visit the opening of the complex. Instead, Iraqi Statesman Tariq Aziz, who was in charge of Youth and Sports, opened the complex. The Gymnasium would go on to host numerous international competitions, and became significant for 1980s and 1990s Iraqi athletes.

News of the completion of the project didn't reach the outside world due to focus on the war with Iran, the Gulf War, and later the isolation of the UN embargo on Iraq. The Gymnasium's existence remained unknown to the outside world until a 2004 article mentioned the complex. During the 2003 US-led invasion of Iraq, US troops took over the complex. Unlike most of Baghdad's sites, the Gymnasium remained intact, even despite the sectarian violence that was happening in al-Sha'ab region at the time. In the early 2010s, the Fondation Le Corbusier signed a renovation project to renovate the Gymnasium. The renovation included the implementation of hanging ceilings, traditional Iraqi-colored glass, multicolored seats, and replacing outdated metal parts with marble. News of the Gymnasium's existence was also all over French media at the time.

In 2024, on the occasion of the Paris Olympic Games, the Fondation Le Corbusier inaugurates an exhibition by artist Louis-Cyprien Rials at Maison La Roche, dedicated to the history of the gymnasium and its architectural, political, and symbolic dimensions. Through a series of photographs, videos, and installations, the exhibition explores the evolution of this space devoted to physical practice and the staging of the body, in dialogue with Le Corbusier’s modernist ideals and the contemporary Olympic context.

=== Publications featuring the Gymnasium ===
In January 1980, the Ministry of Housing and Constructions – State Commission for Buildings issued an Arabic publication celebrating the completion of the building:

"Of the things we must take into consideration at this time is the importance of the Youth and of supporting them and the activities they take part in, and their economic, social, and political effects on the State's policy. Here is why such a gymnasium is an essential need for our youth: this gymnasium is one of the most essential outcomes of the Revolution, for Iraq's young people and for supporting and developing its sportsmanship. Of the most special characteristics of this gymnasium is its novelty in Iraq. Together with the al-Sha'ab Stadium and the Olympic Pool, which will be built next to the Gymnasium, the complex will mark the beginning of a Sport Center. The State Commission for Buildings is proud to present this Gymnasium to our sportsmen. Finished in record time, the Gymnasium's utmost architectural distinction is considered a great example of the contemporary architectural arts in Iraq. We wish for our sportsmen's efforts to succeed, and here is an initiative that furthers our support and giving."

== See also ==
- List of Le Corbusier buildings
- Frank Lloyd Wright's "Plan for a Greater Baghdad"
- Saint-Pierre, Firminy
