= Corbusier (disambiguation) =

Corbusier may refer to:

- Le Corbusier (1887–1965; as Charles-Édouard Jeanneret-Gris), Swiss architect, designer, planner, and artist
  - Le Corbusier's Five Points of Architecture, the architecture manifesto of Le Corbusier
  - The Architectural Work of Le Corbusier, a world heritage site
  - Le Corbusier's Furniture, a furniture line
- Pavillon Le Corbusier, Seefeld, Zürich, Switzerland; an art museum for the works of Le Corbusier
- Fondation Le Corbusier, a foundation conserving the works of Le Corbusier
- Lycée Le Corbusier (disambiguation) (French: The Corbusier Lyceum), several schools named 'Corbusier'

== See also ==
- Les Freres Corbusier (French: The Cobbler Brothers), a New York theatre company
- List of Le Corbusier buildings
- Category:Le Corbusier
