= Georges-Henri Pingusson =

French architect (1894–1978)

Georges-Henri Pingusson (July 26, 1894 – October 22, 1978) was a French architect.

== Biography ==
Georges-Henri Pingusson was born 1894 in Clermont-Ferrand. 1920-1925 he studied architecture at the École des Beaux-Arts in Paris.

He built hotel Latitude 43 and several villas in the south of France. 1936 he greatly expanded Villa Ternisien in Paris, which had been designed by Pierre Jeanneret and Le Corbusier just nine years before and was almost completely demolished in the process.

1945-1950 Pingusson worked on a master plan for the reconstruction of Saarbrücken based on the ideals of the Athens Charter. His plan was accepted by the city council, but it was never executed. His design for the French embassy was executed after he had left the city.

As chief architect for the reconstruction of the Moselle and Lorraine regions (1949–1961) he was responsible for the reconstruction of towns after the war. Waldwisse, destroyed in the war, was reconstructed according to his zoning plan, as was Briey-en-Fôret, where he designed several public buildings and invited Le Corbusier to build an Unité d'Habitation.

He was a member of the Union des Artistes Modernes (UAM) from 1929 until its dissolution in 1958 and professor at the École des Beaux-Arts in Paris.

Pingusson died in 1978 in Paris.

== Works ==
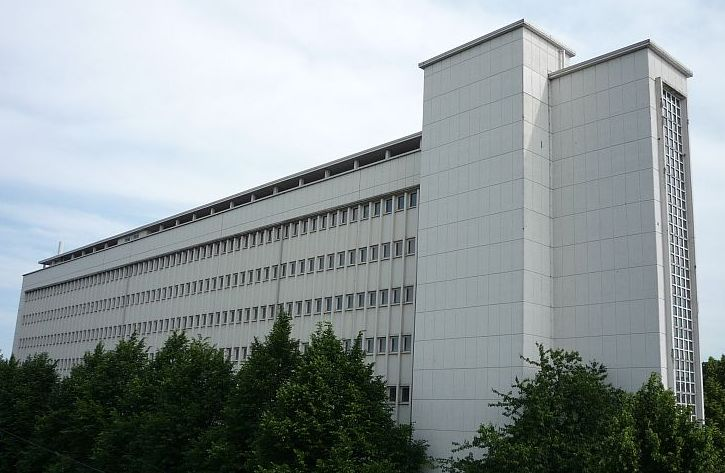
French embassy, Saarbrücken

Incomplete list of works (source Künstlerlexikon Saar unless indicated otherwise):

- hippodrome de la Canche, Le Touquet-Paris-Plage (with Paul Furiet) (1925)
- Villa Caron, Biarritz
- Villa Isola Serena, Cannes (1927)
- Villa Romée, Cannes (1928)
- Hotel Latitude 43, Saint-Tropez (1929–1932)
- Villa Ternisien, Boulogne-Billancourt, rue Denfert-Rochereau 5 (1936)
- église Saint-Maximin, Boust
- église Saint-Martin, Corny-sur-Moselle
- reconstruction of Waldwisse (1948–1955)
- French embassy, Saarbrücken (1950–1954)
- Mémorial des Martyrs de la Déportation, Paris (1962)
