= Villa Romée =

- Interactive map of the Villa Romée area

General information
- Type: House
- Location: 5 esplanade du Golfe, Cannes, France
- Coordinates: 43°32′59″N 6°59′45″E
- Completed: 1928

Design and construction
- Architects: Georges-Henri Pingusson; Paul Furiet

The Villa Romée is a historic mansion in Cannes. It was built in 1928 for Marcelle Aron, the widow of Jacques Isidore Gompel, a World War I veteran. It was designed by architects Georges-Henri Pingusson and Paul Furiet. The garden was built in 1929. Aron sold the house in 1935. It has been listed as an official historical monument since 1994.
