= Plan for Greater Baghdad =

Master plan designed by Frank Lloyd Wright

Aerial view of the plan for Baghdad. At top left is Wright's plan for Baghdad University and at bottom right a botanical garden. Visible on the Isle of Edena in the center are a statue of Harun al-Rashid (bottom left) and an opera house (top right). The inscription at the bottom names the plan and dedicates it to "Sumeria, Isis, Larsa, and Babylon".

The Plan for Greater Baghdad was a project done by American architect Frank Lloyd Wright for a cultural center, opera house, and university on the outskirts of Baghdad, Iraq, in 1957–58. The most thoroughly developed aspects of the plan were the opera house, which would have been built on an island in the middle of the Tigris together with museums and a towering gilded statue of Harun al-Rashid, and the university. Due to the 1958 collapse of the Hashemite monarchy, development of the project stopped, and it was never built.

Wright was among the many elite Western architects invited to Iraq as part of a campaign to modernize the capital city. Wright distinguished himself from this group by developing a plan making specific reference to Iraqi history and culture. For Wright, the plan was one of a handful of grandiose, outsize designs produced in the later part of his career.

== Commission and history ==
In the 1950s, Iraq was awash with new oil money. The deal negotiated in the first years of the decade with the Western-controlled Iraq Petroleum Company, which held a monopoly on oil exploration and development, increased the government's share of revenues substantially. Some of this money was dedicated to the construction of new public buildings in Baghdad. As the government, headed by King Faisal II, developed a general scheme for the capital, it determined to call upon world-famous architects—mostly Westerners—to participate in the modernization of the city. The decision was a break with the city's long-established traditional forms, as the architects selected were among the titans of modern architecture and were intended to build within that aesthetic.

Numerous prominent Western architects were invited to Iraq on government commission, including Walter Gropius, Le Corbusier, Oscar Niemeyer, and Wright. Wright received a commission for an opera house in January 1957 and accepted it before the end of the month. He visited the city in May. Originally, the commission called for the opera house to be built on a site in the center of the city. On his visit, Wright instead selected an island in the middle of the Tigris as his site; the area was at the time undeveloped as only recent flood-control measures had made it suitable for construction. With this larger site available to him, Wright was free to develop a plan for not simply an opera house but a full cultural center. After returning to his studio at Taliesin, he developed a concept for a university on the left bank of the Tigris. (Ultimately, the university plan used was one by Gropius, which exists today.)

In July 1958, the Hashemite monarchy collapsed, King Faisal II was killed, and a new government led by Abd al-Karim Qasim took over the country. At first the new government indicated that it intended to continue working with Wright, but they soon objected to the scale and extravagance of Wright's ideas; they declared, in the words of Robert Twombly, "that the people needed food, clothing and shelter more than floating gardens, gold fountains, and a mammoth zoo." Wright's work on the project stopped and it was never built; Wright would die less than a year later. Grady Gammage Memorial Auditorium at Arizona State University is a simplified version of Wright's opera house design.

== Isle of Edena ==
Wright's opera house was designed for his island site, which he intended to rename from Pig Island to Edena. The island was to be connected to the mainland by two bridges. One, the Low Bridge, crossed the narrower west channel of the Tigris and met up with the planned King Faisal Esplanade; the line of the bridge and esplanade passed through the opera house and pointed toward Mecca. The larger Great Bridge was to cross the east channel of the river and connect the island to the university campus there.

At the north end of the island, Wright envisioned a 91-metre (300 ft) statue of Harun al-Rashid built of gilded sheet metal and placed on a spiraling base resembling the Malwiya Tower at the Great Mosque of Samarra. The vertical faces would depict camels climbing the spiraling ramp.

An avenue was to run the length of the island from the statue to the opera house, and the middle of the island occupied by art museums and shopping areas, forming a cultural center.

== Opera house ==
The opera house itself was intended to serve the Baghdad Symphony Orchestra. Wright's design was flexible enough to accommodate anywhere from 1600 to 7000 people. The building sits on a hill and is approached by a road spiraling up from the base of the hill to the opera house at the top. A pool surrounds the theater and is itself surrounded by gardens.

The building's most significant feature was a large proscenium arch, which was visible inside the theater but also continued outside the building and plunged into the surrounding pool. The arch, which Wright described as a "crescent rainbow," contained roundels depicting scenes from The Book of One Thousand and One Nights. In additional allusions to the local culture, the building is topped with a statue of Aladdin holding his lamp and a spire which Wright intended to represent the "Sword of Mohammed."

The Grady Gammage Memorial Auditorium at Arizona State University's Tempe, Arizona campus is reputed to have been based on this opera house design.

== University campus ==
The Iraqi government planned a new university campus for Baghdad University on a peninsula formed by a bend in the Tigris. Wright planned for a campus surrounded by a wide, circular earthen barrier, which Wright called the "curriculum." This barrier provides definition to the campus, and also contains roads and parking that served the campus's transportation needs. The space inside the barrier is reserved for pedestrian traffic only, and features fountains and gardens to create a parklike environment.

The school's various departments and academic faculties were in buildings attached to the circular "curriculum." The center of the campus is devoted to television and radio studios and towers, which were intended to demonstrate the modernity of Baghdad. Architectural historian Neil Levine observes that the circular plan for the university recalls the original plan for Baghdad developed by the caliph Al-Mansur.

== Criticism, analysis, and relation to Wright's oeuvre ==
=== Architectural ===
The Baghdad project was one of numerous grandiose ideas Wright developed in the late years of his career, almost all of which were too expensive or impracticable ever to be built. These included the Point Park Civic Center and The Illinois. James Dennis and Lu Wenneker describe these projects, particularly the Baghdad plan, as "dream projects…large scale ornaments spread out upon the landscape." Certain features of the Baghdad design, such as the spiraling ramps, are characteristic of Wright's work. The spiraling ramp appears memorably in the Solomon R. Guggenheim Museum and also in unbuilt projects such as the Gordon Strong Automobile Objective and the Point Park Civic Center.

The depiction of Arabian cultural themes in the opera house arch results in what Wendell Cole describes as the "most fantastic" architecture Wright ever produced.

Unknown to Wright, these fanciful designs effectively eliminated him from ever being asked to design a United States Embassy building; the Architectural Advisory Committee, which advised Foreign Buildings Operations on which top American architects to employ for the massive Cold War expansion, comprised architects Henry R. Shepley, Ralph T. Walker and Pietro Belluschi. Shepley had suggested taking a "chance" on Wright, but soon saw Wright's designs for the University of Baghdad, and wrote to the head of the FBO to withdraw his earlier suggestion, saying, "I think [Wright] has 'had it.'"

=== Cultural significance ===
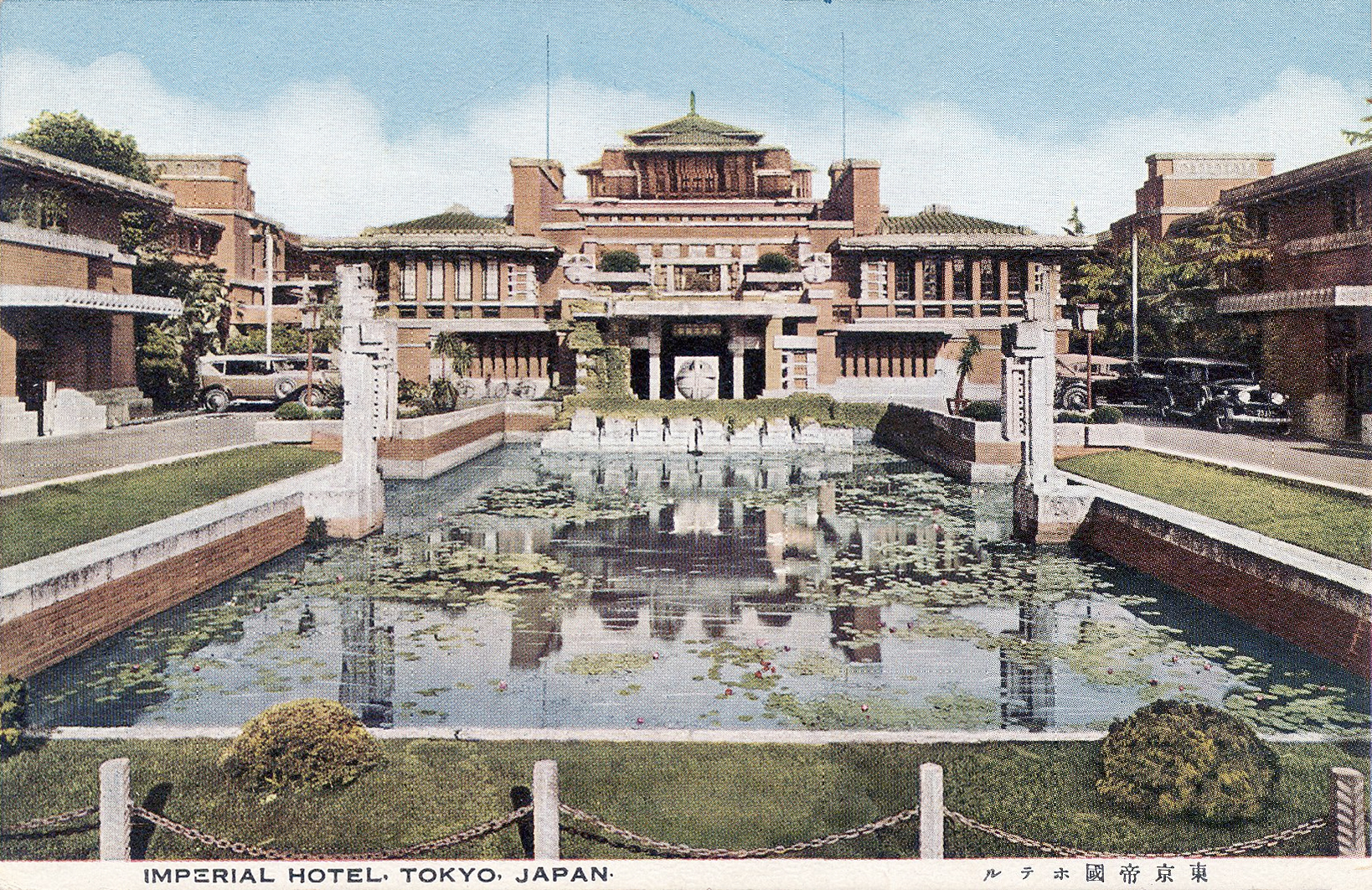
Wright's Imperial Hotel in Tokyo was his previous major commission for a culture outside the West.

The plan is one of Wright's few architectural involvements with a non-Western culture; the only other example of similar prominence is his design for the Imperial Hotel in Tokyo. While the Iraqi government, in commissioning Western architects, was focused on rapidly developing the capital, Wright was focused on preserving the distinct history and architectural tradition of the city. While visiting Baghdad he gave a speech to a group of Iraqi engineers, in which he contrasted the “spiritual integrity” of the Eastern world with the materialistic, commerce-focused society of the West. He implored them not to let architects come to the city and “put a cliché to work,” and recommended that they connect with “what is deep in the spirit.”

Levine observes that Wright's attempt to incorporate major elements of the city's history local culture stands out in comparison to the designs for Baghdad produced at about the same time by other prominent Western artists like Le Corbusier and Gropius: "the other invited Westerners proposed buildings that were in essence the same as they might have designed for their home countries, which in fact many originally were." For instance, Gropius's plan for the university included modern office towers similar to what might be found in an American or European city, and was built using the same principles his team had applied in designing American college campuses. However, Western architects attempting to build within the Islamic milieu opened themselves to criticism. Wright's familiarity with local history and culture was limited, and Nicolai Ouroussoff argues that the decorative camels, the Aladdin statue, and other such features made the plan “an embarrassing example of Western chauvinism.” Levine describes Gropius's one nod to the setting, a domed mosque, as “an Orientalizing pastiche of Saarinen's Kresge Chapel at MIT.” A cynical perspective might posit that, while Wright evidently made an effort to consult the city's genius loci, he may have succeeded only in creating a patronizing appeal to four thousand years of tradition.

== See also ==
- List of Frank Lloyd Wright works
