= Sugarloaf Mountain (Maryland) =

Mountain and park about 10 miles (16 km) south of Frederick, Maryland, USA

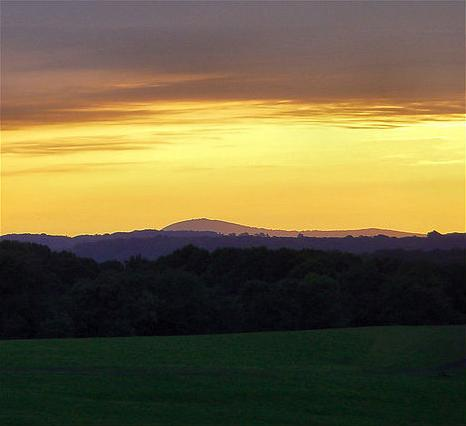
- Sugarloaf Mountain, sunset

Highest point
- Elevation: 1,283 ft (391 m)
- Prominence: 802 ft (244 m)
- Isolation: 14.26 mi (22.95 km)
- Coordinates: 39°16′9.15″N 77°23′42.89″W

Geography
- Location: Frederick County, Maryland
- Parent range: Blue Ridge Mountains (outlier)

Geology
- Rock age: approx. 500 million years
- Mountain type: Monadnock

Climbing
- Easiest route: Stairway and trail to summit

U.S. National Natural Landmark
- Designated: June 1969

Sugarloaf Mountain is a small (1,283 feet; 391 m) mountain and park about 10 miles (16 km) south of Frederick, Maryland. The closest village is Barnesville, located just over one mile from the foot of the mountain. The peak of this relatively low mountain is approximately 800 feet (244 m) higher than the surrounding farmland. It is visible from many parts of northern Montgomery County and southern Frederick County, notably from I-270 north of the town of Germantown. Because of its geological and natural history interest, it was designated a National Natural Landmark in 1969. It is a notable example of an admission-free (although donations are requested), privately owned scenic park.

== History ==
The mountain was visited in 1712 by Christoph von Graffenried, 1st Baron of Bernberg and his French-Canadian guide, Martin Chartier. The Baron wrote:

From there we went further back upon a mountain of the highest in those parts, called Sugar Loaf, for it has the form of a loaf of sugar. We took with us Martin Chartier, a surveyor we also had with us, and there came with us several Indians. From the mountain we viewed an exceedingly broad extent Of country, a part of Virginia, Maryland, Pennsylvania, and Carolina, used the compass, [and] made us a map.

During the Maryland Campaign of the American Civil War in 1862, Union forces occupying the summit, which was being used as an observation and signal station, first spotted the Army of Northern Virginia on September 5 as it crossed the Potomac River into Maryland. The following morning as the small Union force on the mountain began to retreat in the face of the oncoming Confederate Army, they ran into the unsuspecting 1st North Carolina Infantry and a small skirmish ensued. The Union force was able to escape, but it was later caught by Confederate cavalry at Urbana.

In the early 20th century Chicago businessman Gordon Strong bought substantial land holdings on and around the mountain. In 1925, the architect Frank Lloyd Wright, on commission from Strong, proposed an automobile objective development for the top of the mountain, but that was never carried out.

President Franklin D. Roosevelt, briefly considered using Sugarloaf as his Presidential retreat, but he was persuaded by Strong to choose the nearby Shang-Ri-La site on the Catoctin Mountain, which today is known as Camp David.

Strong set up a trust fund in 1947 that maintains a trail system and other tourist facilities at Sugarloaf Mountain. The mountain and its immediate environs continue to be open to the public, but they are privately owned by Stronghold, Incorporated.

== Geology ==
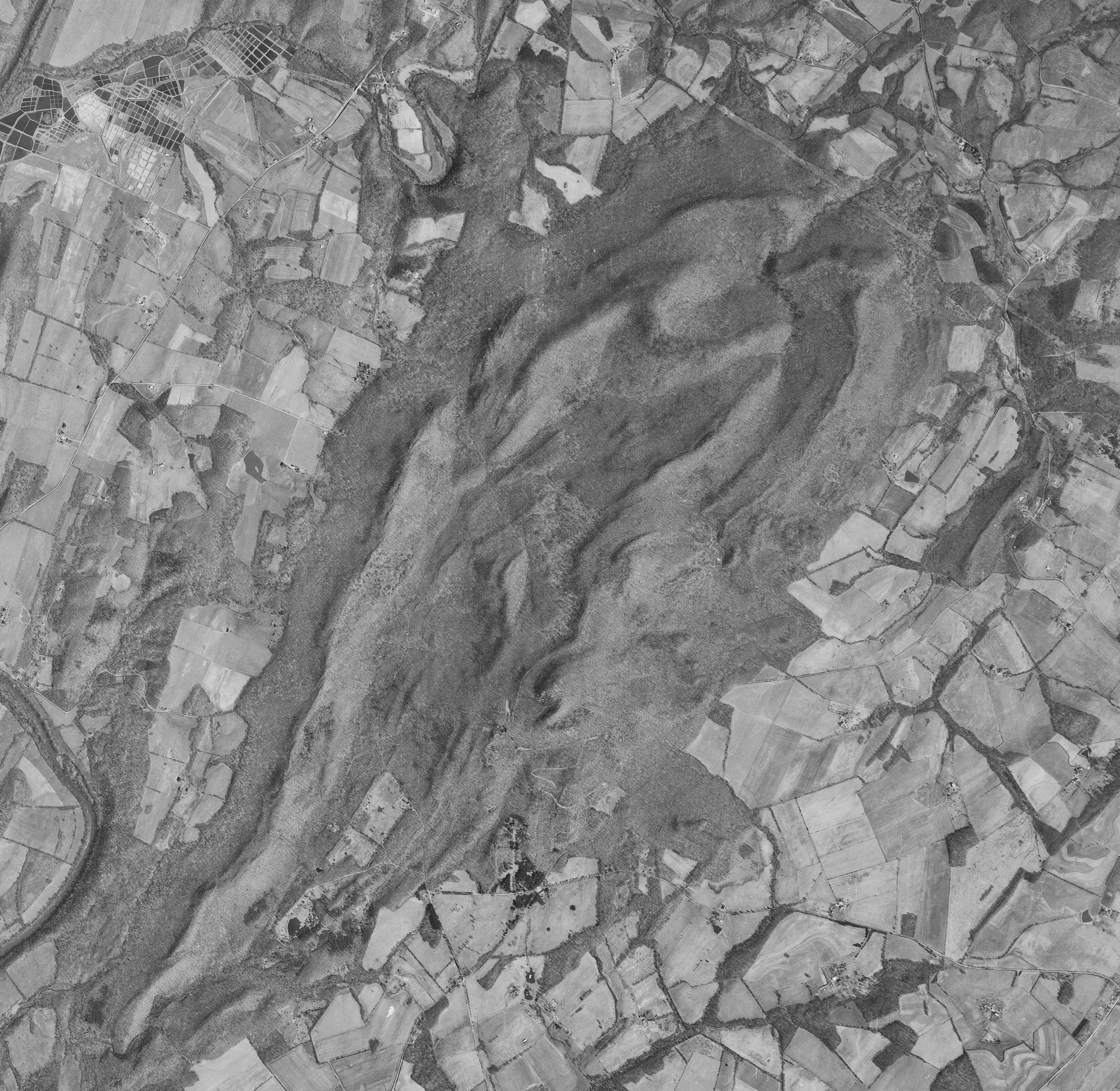
1971 air photo, showing the complex structure. Width of image is approximately 4.7 miles.

Sugarloaf Mountain is an example of a monadnock — an isolated hill or small mountain rising abruptly from gently sloping or level surrounding land. It appears to be either an outlier to the east of the main mass of Catoctin Mountain, or a root remnant of the ancient Appalachian Mountains.

The bedrock is the Lower Cambrian Sugarloaf Mountain Quartzite, a massive white quartzite interbedded with softer sericitic quartzite, slate, and phyllite. The formation is divided into upper, middle, and lower members.

== Tourism ==
Sugarloaf Mountain is an area tourist attraction, free of an admission charge, and open to the public. Visitors are however encouraged to voluntarily donate $5. Activities include hiking, rock climbing, picnicking, and sightseeing. The mountain is known to locals for its scenic views. The Sugarloaf Mountain Trail system is a popular network of trails that link the East Face with the West Face. The blue trail system is popular with hikers while the yellow trail system can also be used by bikers and horseback riders at designated times of the year. The Strong Mansion at the base of the mountain is often used for weddings and other special events, and the nearby Sugarloaf Mountain Vineyard is a popular side excursion.

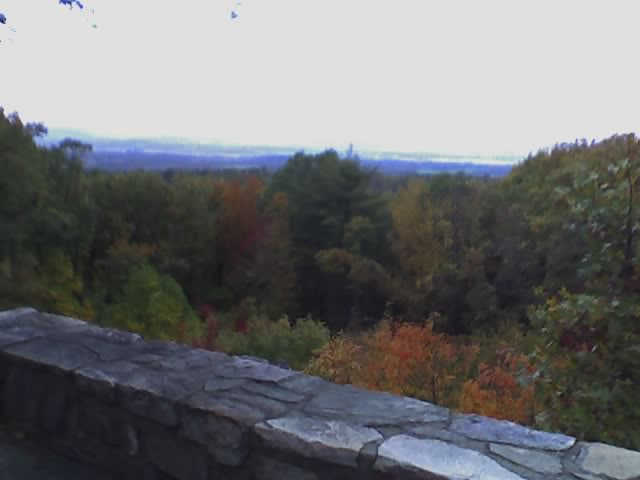
The scenic overlook at Sugarloaf Mountain

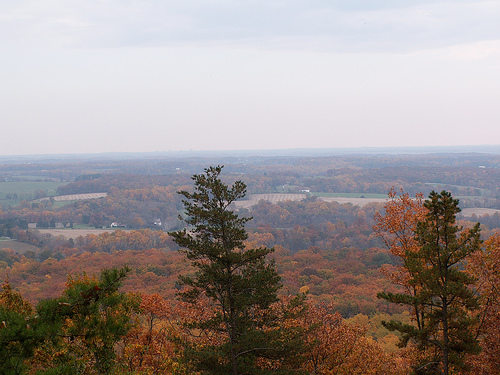
View at the top during fall

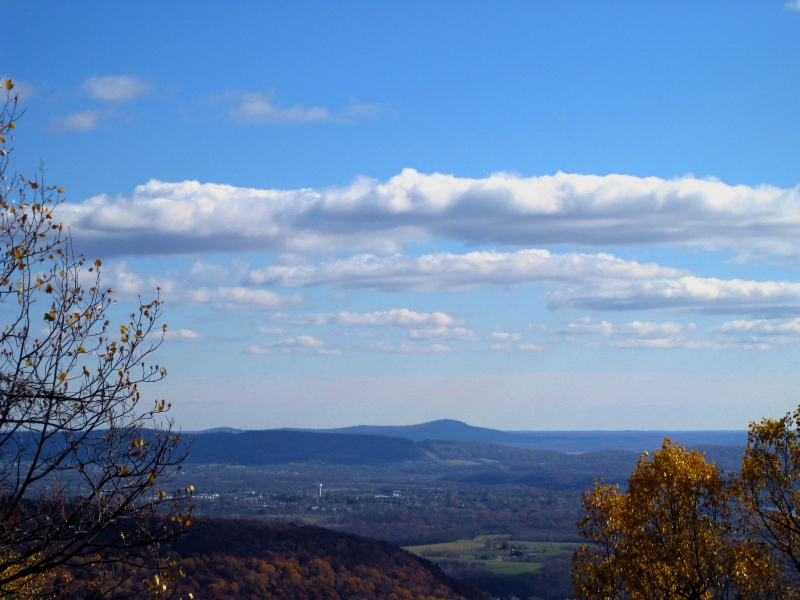
Sugarloaf Mountain as seen from Maryland Heights

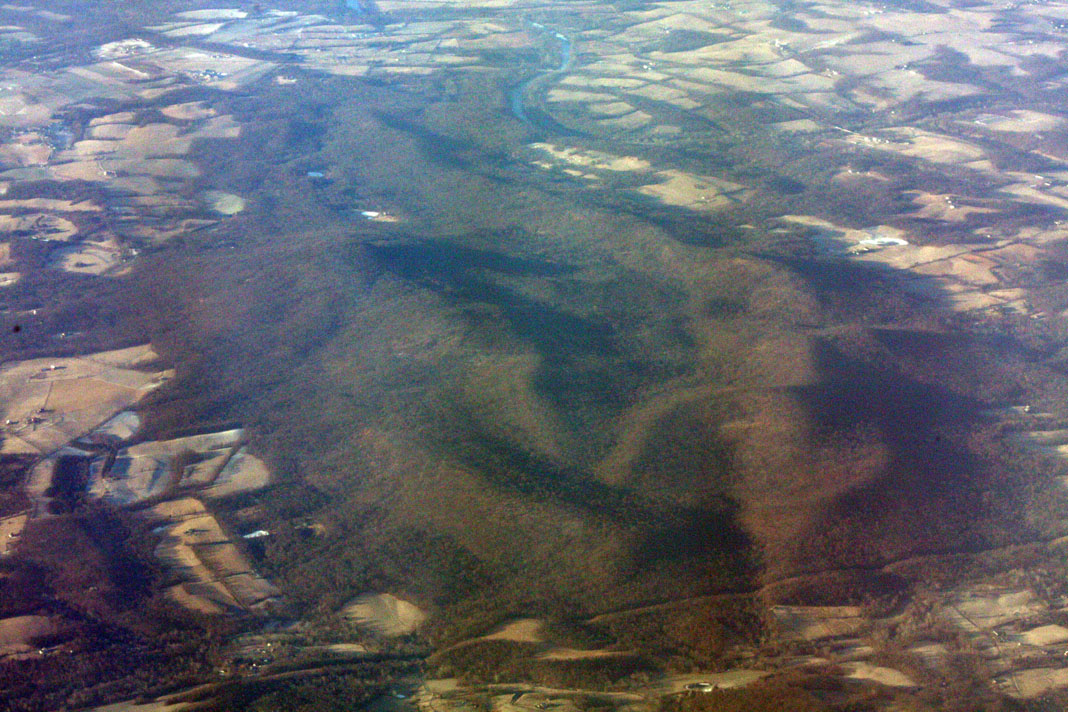
Oblique air photo of Sugarloaf Mountain, facing southwest, January 2009

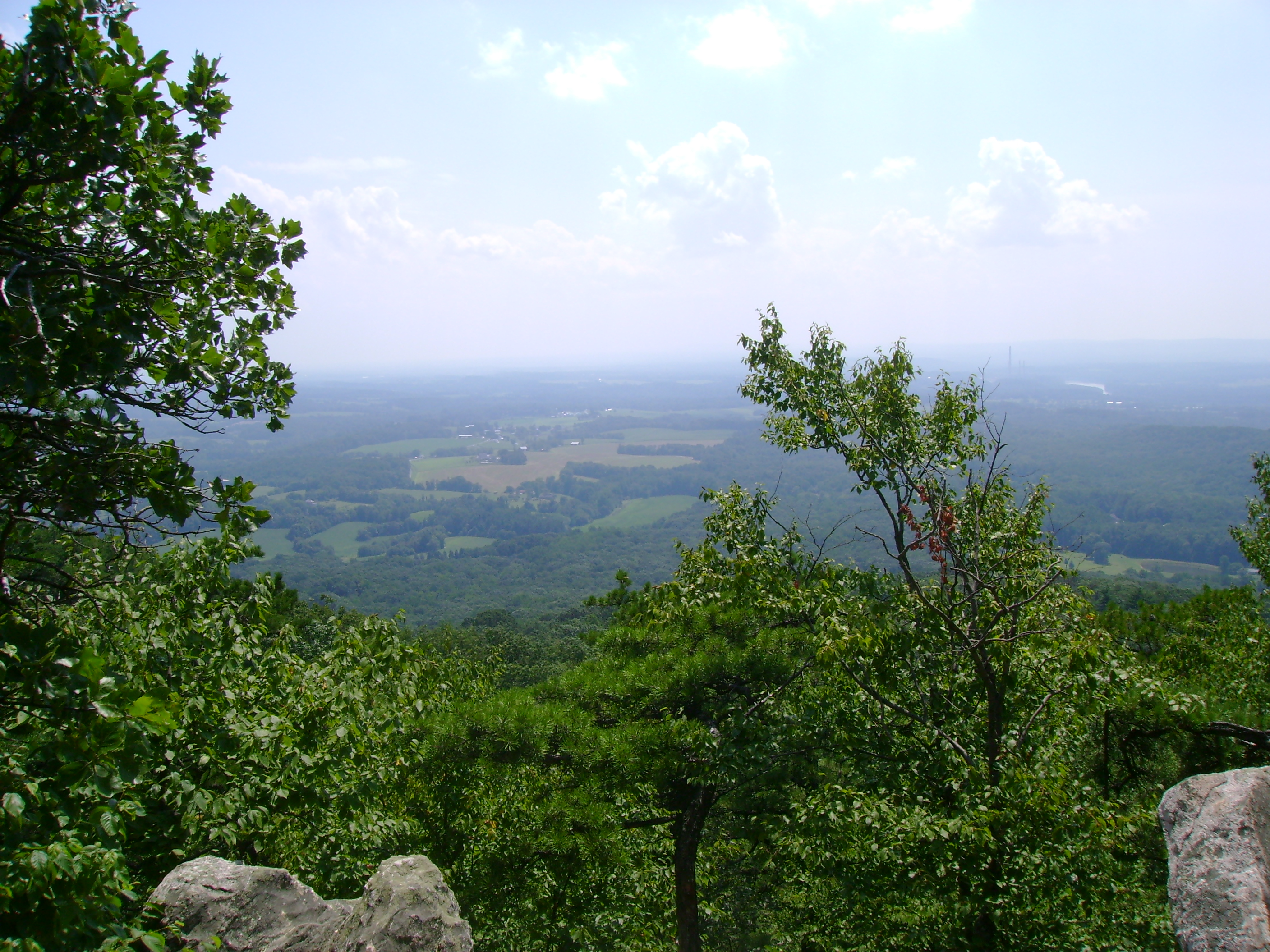
The base of the mountain, as seen from the top.
