= Raoul Albert La Roche =

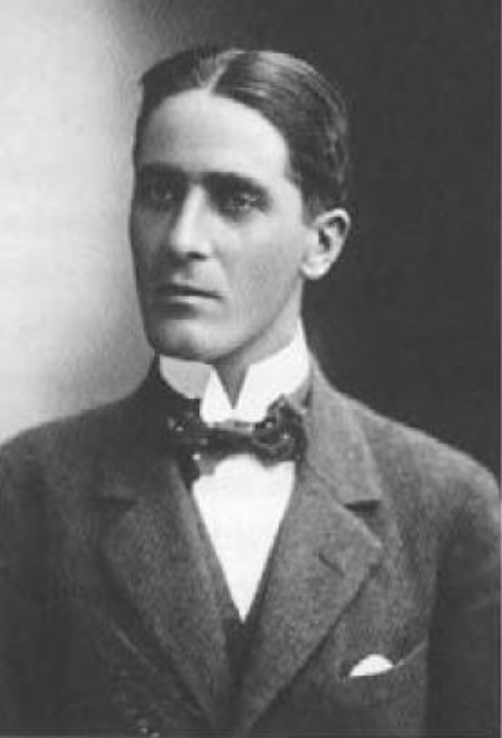
- Born: 23 February 1889; Basel, Switzerland
- Died: 15 June 1965 (aged 76); Basel
- Occupations: Banker and art collector
- Parents: Louis La Roche (father); Emilie Caroline Burckhardt (mother)

Raoul Albert La Roche (23 February 1889 – 15 June 1965) was a Swiss banker and art collector. He was especially interested in purism and cubism and his collections have been donated to museums in Switzerland and France. His home in Paris, Maison La Roche, was designed by his friend Le Corbusier and now houses the Le Corbusier Foundation.

== Early life ==
Raoul Albert La Roche was born on 23 February 1889, and grew up in Basel, Switzerland in a bourgeois family, very closely linked to the world of art. He was the second son of the banker Louis La Roche and Emilie Caroline Burckhardt. He studied at the School of Trading in Neuchâtel (Switzerland), and became an apprentice in the Bank of Basel, and worked in Berlin and London.

== Career ==
In 1912, at the age of 23, La Roche moved to Paris to work for the Banque Suisse et Française (BSF), which became in 1917 the Crédit Commercial de France. He made his career there, retiring in 1954.

In 1940, during the invasion of France by the German army, he left Paris and moved to Lyon, keeping his job at the bank, until the end of the war. He returned to Paris after the war.

== Links with the artistic world ==
In 1918, La Roche met Le Corbusier and was attracted to the purism style of painting whose foundations were laid by Le Corbusier.

In 1922, on the occasion of a trip to Venice and Vicenza (Italy) with Le Corbusier, La Roche planned to have a villa built by his friend. This project became the "Villa della Rocca" (Villa La Roche) in Paris, at the "Square du Docteur-Blanche". The villa was built in joint ownership with Le Corbusier's brother, the violinist Albert Jeanneret, and housed his collections of paintings, including works by Picasso, Braque, Fernand Léger. La Roche donated this villa to Le Corbusier for his foundation.

== Death ==
La Roche died on 15 June 1965 in Basel. He bequeathed one-third of his collection to the Musée du Louvre, another third to his hometown (Basel), which can be seen in the Kunstmuseum Basel, and the last third to the Fondation Le Corbusier.
