= Gordon Strong Automobile Objective =

Unfinished building in Maryland

Coordinates: 39°15′46.3″N 77°23′34.24″W

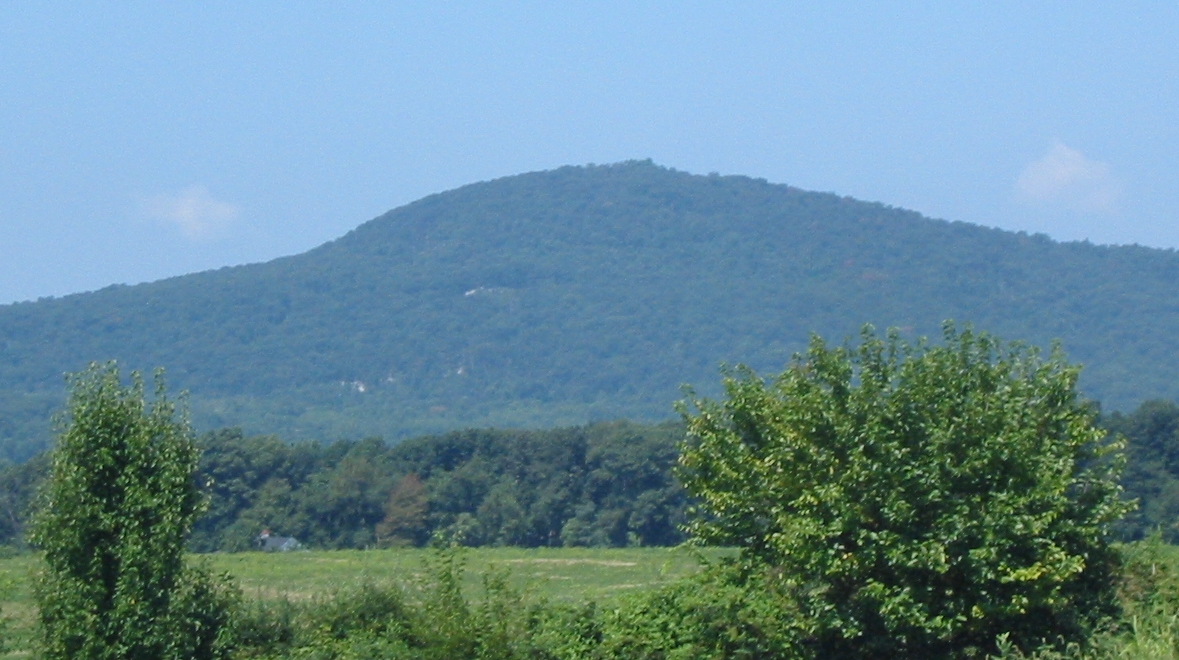
Sugarloaf Mountain, the proposed site, as it exists today

The Gordon Strong Automobile Objective was a proposed planetarium, restaurant, and scenic overlook designed by American architect Frank Lloyd Wright for the top of Sugarloaf Mountain in Maryland. Wright developed the design in 1925 on commission from Chicago businessman Gordon Strong. A spiraling ramp featured centrally in Wright's plan; this was his first use of a feature which would later gain fame as part of his Guggenheim Museum in New York.

== History and design ==
Strong became familiar with Sugarloaf Mountain while living in Washington, D.C., prior to around the start of the 20th century. The mountain is a monadnock which due to the lack of competing peaks in the area possesses considerable views of its surroundings. Strong began to buy land on Sugarloaf Mountain as early as 1902, and between then and his retirement in 1935 he developed various plans for developing the mountain as a resort or recreation center. The "automobile objective" idea was one such plan, which Strong proposed to Wright in 1924. The "automobile objective" was primarily a day-trip destination; people would drive out to the mountain, perhaps picnic while enjoying the scenic views, and then return home.

Wright's design went through various iterations, but the main feature was a ziggurat-like circular structure at the pinnacle of the mountain. The structure was wrapped in a spiraling ramp which cars would use to ascend and descend. The ramp was the main exterior feature of the structure, aside from a tall spire sticking up from the center, which was likely intended as a mooring post for dirigibles. Parking for hundreds of cars was placed inside the building.

In developing the concept, Wright decided to include an auditorium inside the spiraling ramps, and move the tower to the side. Another notable element of this design was the specification of glass, or glass blocks in concrete armature, as the material for the ramp, which would let more natural light into the interior space. This was possibly impractical but certainly daring.

Wright's final and most complete plan for the site replaced the interior theatre with a larger domed open space that would be used as a planetarium. This was the plan that he presented to Strong in 1925. The size of the interior dome necessitated moving all parking outside, onto the ramp itself, and limited the space available for eateries and overnight bedrooms. Strong regarded the plan as unsuitable and rejected it, believing that it allocated space poorly and violated the integrity of the mountaintop. Wright reacted sharply to the rejection: "I have given you a noble 'archaic' sculptured summit for your mountain. I should have diddled it away with platforms and seats and spittoons for ... expectorating businessmen and the flappers that beset them."

== Critical commentary and legacy ==
Mark Reinberger asserts that the design is evidence of Wright's desire to find a new form of architectural expression, a utopian scheme reliant on modern technology—in the case of this project, the automobile. Wright's vision culminated in his plan for Broadacre City. In Broadacre City, automobile objectives would be built at locations of natural beauty to serve as a meeting places and social centers. Sugarloaf Mountain was an early expression of Wright's attachment to the automobile as an important social artifact. He criticized people driving to a destination and leaving their car parked underground: "leaving the automobiles in which they both now really live and have their beings, still 'parked' aside,—betrayed and abandoned as usual."

The Gordon Strong plan was Wright's first spiral-based building, but he returned to the element at least six times, building first the V. C. Morris Gift Shop (1948) in San Francisco and finally delivering the well-known Solomon R. Guggenheim Museum (1943–1959). Other instances include the unbuilt plans for the Point Park Civic Center (1947) and the Baghdad Cultural Center (1957).

== See also ==
- List of Frank Lloyd Wright works
