= Immeuble Molitor =

Apartment building in Paris designed by Le Corbusier

Coordinates: 48°50′36″N 2°15′05″E

- Interactive map of the Immeuble Molitor area

General information
- Type: Residential
- Architectural style: Modernist
- Location: 24, rue Nungesser et Coli, Paris, France
- Construction started: 1932
- Completed: 1934

Technical details
- Floor count: 8

Design and construction
- Architects: Le Corbusier, Pierre Jeanneret

UNESCO World Heritage Site
- Designated: 2016 (40th session)
- Part of: The Architectural Work of Le Corbusier, an Outstanding Contribution to the Modern Movement
- Reference no.: 1321-008

Immeuble Molitor is an apartment building designed by Le Corbusier and Pierre Jeanneret and built between 1931 and 1934. Located at the border between the city of Paris and the commune of Boulogne-Billancourt in France, it has been listed along with 16 other architectural works by Le Corbusier as a UNESCO World Heritage Site. Le Corbusier lived in the building from its completion until his death in 1965.

== Location ==
The east facade is located at 24, rue Nungesser et Coli, which marks the border between the 16th arrondissement of Paris and the commune of Boulogne-Billancourt. The west facade overlooks rue de la Tourelle, located entirely within Boulogne-Billancourt.

== History ==
In 1931, the real estate developer Société Immobilière de Paris Parc des Princes, represented by Marc Kouznetzoff and Guy Noble, acquired a building site in the east of Paris, adjacent to Boulogne. Le Corbusier and his cousin Pierre Jeanneret were commissioned to design an apartment building for the site, and asked to find potential clients from among their acquaintances. The developers had not yet secured the required financing and were eager to demonstrate that avant-garde architecture could be more attractive to buyers than the conventional buildings in the vicinity.

Between July and October 1931, Le Corbusier and Jeanneret designed an eight-story building with fifteen apartments, with two or three units per level. The design applied four of Le Corbusier's five points of modern architecture – free floor plan, structure supported by columns rather than walls, free facade, and roof garden. Le Corbusier negotiated with the developers and acquired the right to occupy the top two floors, to be built at his own expense, for his apartment.

Construction began in 1932. It was interrupted for several months because some of the units had yet to find buyers, while the two developers were facing serious financial difficulties. The building was completed in early 1934, but by 1935 the Société Immobilière de Paris Parc des Princes had gone bankrupt. The bank which had financed the project contested Le Corbusier's title of ownership and wished to sell the entire building. This was the start of a decade of legal proceedings, at the end of which, in 1949, the architect's title was recognized. During these years maintenance of the building was neglected, causing problems with rust in later years.

A major renovation was conducted in 1950, and again in 1962. The architect and his wife resided in this building until she died in 1957 and his in 1965. Since his death the atelier and apartment are owned by the Fondation Le Corbusier and may be visited by appointment (closed for renovations from September 2016 to May 2018). One wall in the lobby is covered by a mural of the architect's Poem of the Right Angle, a statement of his late aesthetics.

== Architecture ==
View toward the living room from the entrance, with stairs to the roof garden on the left

=== Facades ===
This building is probably the most traditional of Le Corbusier's mature works. The design was constrained by the narrow (12 m (39 ft)) and deep (24 m (79 ft)) configuration of the site and by strict zoning codes, which specified the parapet height, conformance to the existing street wall, and even the placement of the balconies and bay windows. Nevertheless, the architect's inventiveness is evident in the all-glass facades. Identical on both elevations, they were inspired by Pierre Chareau and Bernard Bijvoet's Maison de Verre, but Le Corbusier departed from Chareau's glass-brick-only prototype by the addition of transparent openings. Externally the facades offer a contrast between solid glass bricks and transparent windows, but internally the apartments are flooded with light across the entire wall.

=== Le Corbusier's apartment and atelier ===
The apartment that Le Corbusier built for his personal use on the top two floors extends over 240 m^{2} (2,600 sq ft). It is reached by stairs from the sixth floor, the last level served by the elevator. Rooms are arranged to eliminate corridors and minimize the number of doors. The seventh floor contains the entrance, living room, kitchen, and atelier. The eighth floor contains a guest room and access to the roof garden. Walls are painted in pure primary colors. The atelier that Le Corbusier used for his painting has a wall of stone and exposed rough brick that contrasts with the modern concrete and glass materials. Furnishings were designed by Le Corbusier's associate Charlotte Perriand.

== Classification ==
This building was listed as a monument historique by the French Ministry of Culture for the apartment of Le Corbusier in 1972 and in 1990 for the facades, court, roof, and entrance hall. In 2016 it was listed along with 16 other architectural works by Le Corbusier as a UNESCO World Heritage Site.

== See also ==
- List of Le Corbusier buildings
