= Gordon Strong =

American businessman

Henry Gordon Strong
- Born: June 3, 1869
- Died: February 24, 1954 (aged 84)
- Spouse: Margaret Hubbard (m. 1901; div. 1911)
- Parent(s): Henry Strong; Mary Jane Halstead

Henry Gordon Strong (June 3, 1869 – February 24, 1954) was a Chicago businessman and founder of Gordon Strong and Company in 1927 which still operates today.

== Life ==
=== Early life ===
He was born in Burlington, Iowa to Henry Strong and Mary Jane Halstead. His father was a well known Chicago attorney and president of the Atchison, Topeka and Santa Fe Railway. His father served as a Colonel in the U. S. Army in the 124th Field Artillery in WWI and as a Lt. Colonel in the 108th Engineers in the Spanish American War.

In April 1890, Gordon and his parents, attended an Easter breakfast held by the United States Secretary of the Interior John Willock Noble. For the event, the 21-year old Gordon was paired with Helen Nicolay, the daughter of John George Nicolay.

In November 1893, he returned to their family home in Washington DC for a short stay, while his family stayed in Chicago.

He graduated with a Masters of Laws degree in June 1894.

In 1895, Gordon became a competitive Polo player for a team in Chicago.

On February 27, 1898, Gordon Strong was appointed Captain for the Battery A, Light Artillery company of the West Virginia National Guard.

In 1899, Gordon Strong, along with Paolo Troubetzkoy and Count Cassini formed the Washington Fencing Club.

=== Marriages ===
On Wednesday, May 15, 1901, Gordon married Margaret Hubbard at the St. James Episcopal Church in Chicago. The ceremony was originally planned to be held in Minneapolis, but plans were changed, and it was held in Chicago due to his mother Mary becoming ill.

On July 27, 1908, Gordon and his wife agreed to a marital compact, where he agreed to pay her a certain amount of money annually. The agreement released both Gordon and Margaret from all dower or inheritance rights from each other. It also stated Gordon would agree to pay Margaret a life annuity of $4,000 for the first ten years, $4,500 for the next ten years, and $5,000 thereafter until her death. Despite the legal agreement, they specified they had no intention of divorcing, that was clarified to try and squash rumors that were circling at the Onwentsia Club and in society. After the contract was agreed upon, Margaret began staying at the Virginia Hotel, and stayed there until she left for Switzerland in December 1908.

On Friday, February 10, 1911, Margaret filed for divorce from Gordon claiming desertion, that reportedly began on December 1, 1908. The divorce was secured on March 28, 1911, but by November, Margaret wanted to have the divorce annulled. The divorce agreement gave her an allowance of $5,000 a year for the first seven years, increasing to $5,500 for the following ten years, and would max out at $6,000 a year, from that point on for the rest of her life. It was reported, she was no longer happy with the terms of the alimony agreement, and had expected to receive a large inheritance as Gordon's wife following the death of his father on October 21. In December, when Henry Strong's will was filed for probate, it revealed no provision was made for Margaret.

In May 1912, Gordon adopted two children, Kenneth and Floyd Keefe, a two-year-old, and a six-year-old. After taking in the first two children, Gordon became a vocal advocate for adoption, and revealed his own plans to adopt a child every year. By 1915, Gordon had adopted seven children. When the SS Eastland disaster occurred in July 1915, offered to adopt another two children who would've been orphaned in the sinking.

Strong was married to his second wife, Louise Ann Snyder on October 8, 1914, in Chicago.

== Philanthropy ==
In 1926, Strong created a scholarship fund for students at George Washington University.

Gordon Strong, the name which he used for most of his life, made several real estate acquisitions centered around his Strong Mansion at Sugarloaf Mountain in Montgomery County, Maryland a monadnock mountain with views of the Potomac River and Monocacy valleys. The property was deeded to Stronghold, Inc., a non-profit land trust created in 1946 which still owns and continues to maintain the property for public access.

In 1925, he engaged Frank Lloyd Wright to develop plans for what became known as the Gordon Strong Automobile Objective This project was never started and the land remains in a more rustic and natural state.
