= Mémorial des Martyrs de la Déportation =

Monument in Paris

Coordinates: 48°51′6″N 2°21′9″E

Mémorial des martyrs de la Déportation
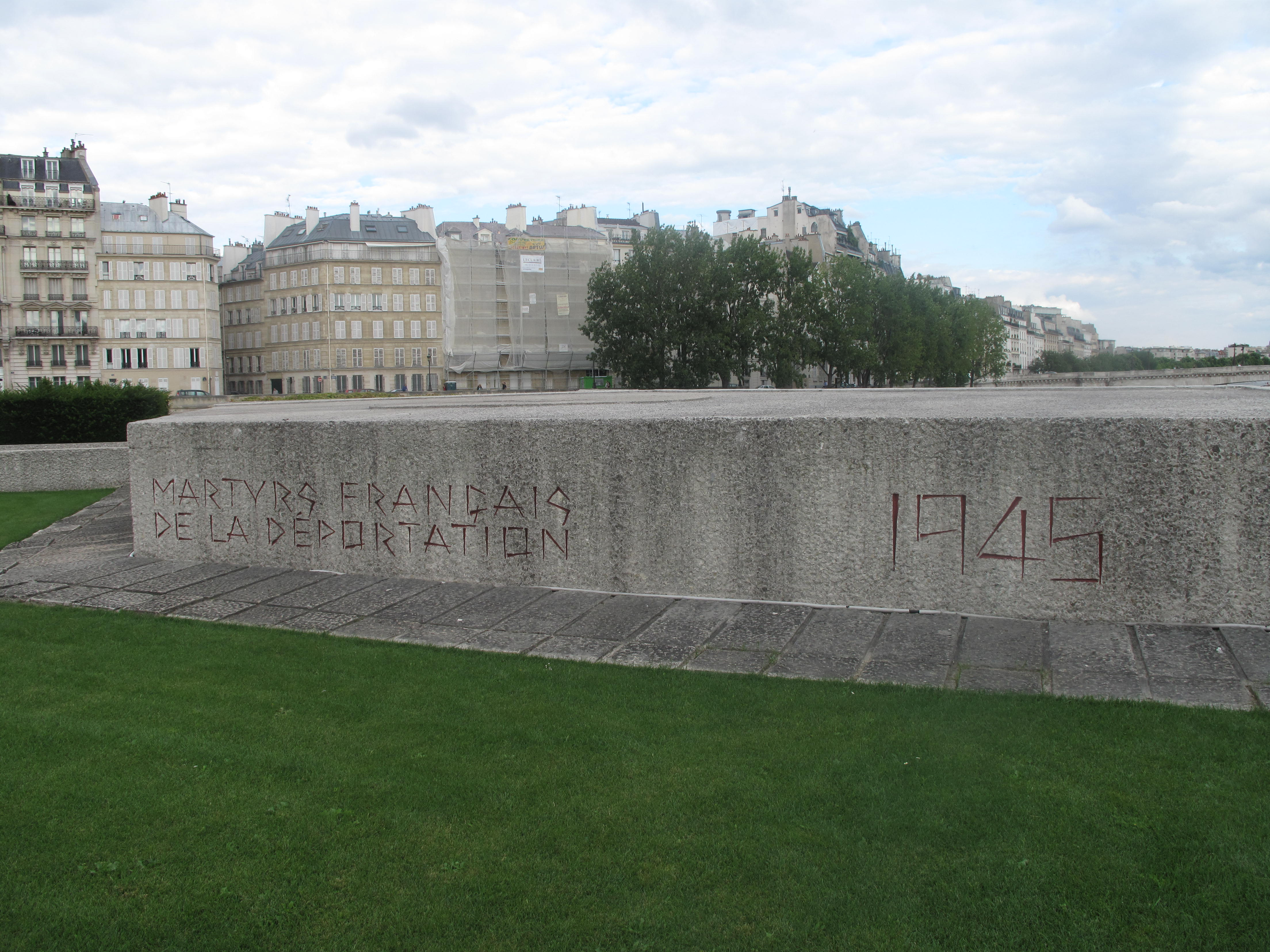
- The memorial at the eastern tip of Île de la Cité
- Interactive map of Mémorial des martyrs de la Déportation
- Location: Paris, France
- Designer: Georges-Henri Pingusson
- Opening date: April 12, 1962
- Dedicated to: 200,000 people deported from Vichy France to the Nazi concentration camps during World War II

The Mémorial des martyrs de la Déportation (English: Memorial to the martyrs of the Deportation) is a memorial to the 200,000 people who were deported from Vichy France to the Nazi concentration camps during World War II. It is located in Paris, France, on the site of a former morgue, underground behind Notre Dame on Île de la Cité. It was designed by French modernist architect Georges-Henri Pingusson and was inaugurated by Charles de Gaulle in 1962.

== Description and history ==
Mémorial des martyrs de la Déportation, located in Paris, France, is a memorial to the more than 200,000 people who were deported from Vichy France to the Nazi concentration camps during World War II. Designed by French architect, writer, teacher, and town planner Georges-Henri Pingusson (1894–1978), the memorial was inaugurated by then-President Charles de Gaulle on April 12, 1962. In the year of its opening, a brochure produced by the French survivors' group "Reseau de souvenir" described the memorial as a crypt, "hollowed out of the sacred isle, the cradle of our nation, which incarnates the soul of France – a place where its spirit dwells."

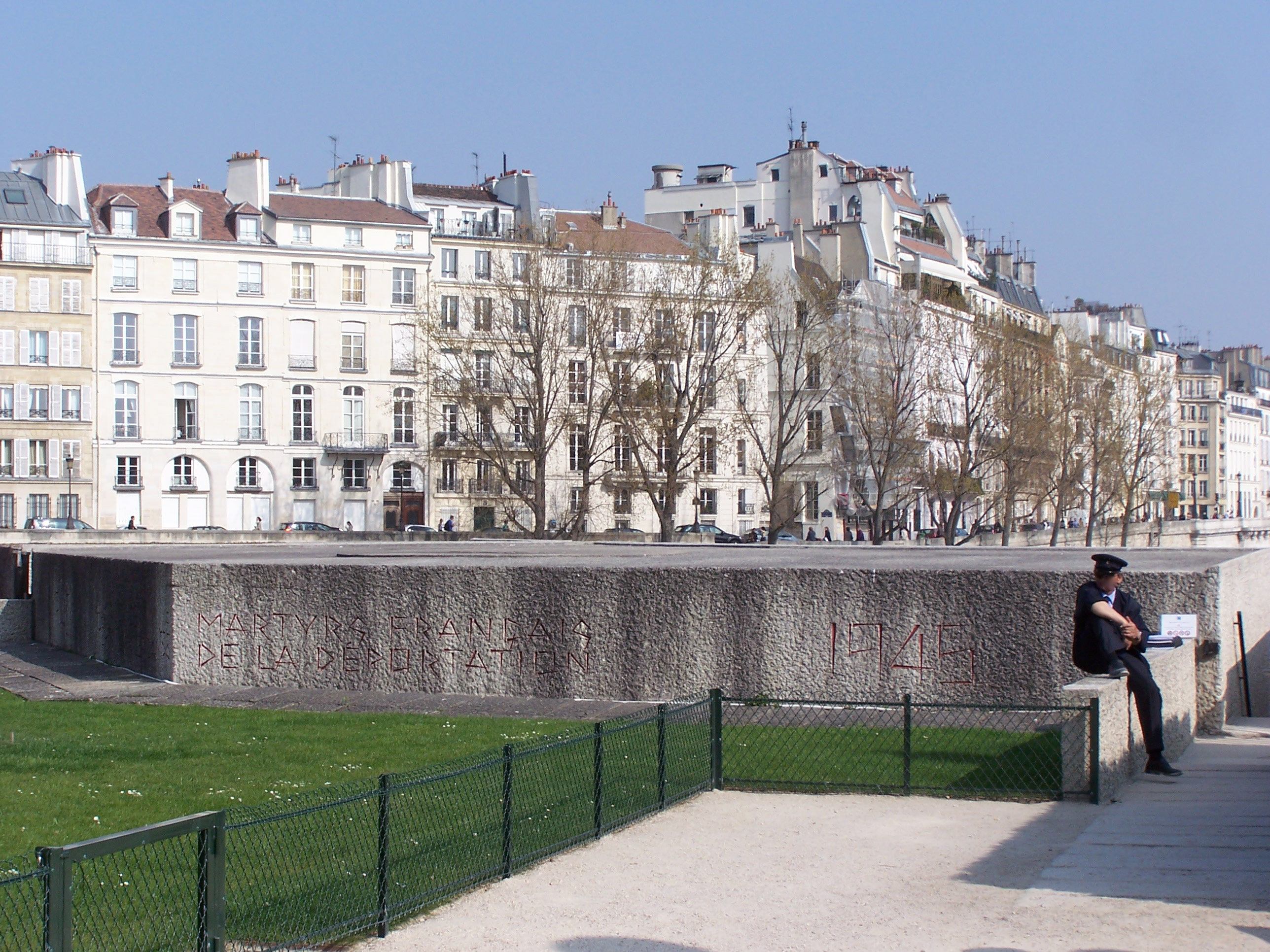
Entrance to the memorial in 2012

The memorial is shaped like a ship's prow; the crypt is accessible by two staircases and a lowered square protected by a metal portcullis. The crypt leads to a hexagonal rotunda that includes two chapels containing earth and bones from concentration camps. The walls display literary excerpts. Pingusson intended that its long and narrow subterranean space convey a feeling of claustrophobia. The memorial's entrance is narrow, marked by two concrete blocks. Inside is the tomb of an unknown deportee who was killed at the camp in Natzweiler-Struthof. Along both walls of the narrow, dimly lit chamber are 200,000 glass crystals with light shining through, meant to symbolize each of the deportees who died in the concentration camps; at the end of the tunnel is a single bright light. Ashes from the camps, contained within urns, are positioned at both lateral ends. Both ends of the chamber have small rooms that seem to depict prison cells. Opposite the entrance is a stark iron gate overlooking the Seine at the tip of the Île de la Cité.

The memorial is open every day except the first Monday of every month and the following days : Jan. 1st – May 1st – December 25th. Opening hours : 10am – 6:30 pm – Last access to the crypt 6 :15 pm. According to Time Out Paris, an annual Day of Remembrance ceremony is hosted at the memorial on the last Sunday of April.

=== Inscriptions ===
The memorial features excerpts of works by Louis Aragon, French poet and French Resistance member Robert Desnos, Paul Éluard, Antoine de Saint-Exupéry and Jean-Paul Sartre. Fragments of two poems by Desnos, himself a deportee, are inscribed on the walls. The first consists of a version of the final stanza of "A la mystérieuse", originally published in Corps et Biens (1930) and then translated into Czech following his death at Theresienstadt concentration camp, and subsequently retranslated into French in Les Lettres françaises (1945):

I have dreamt so very much of you,
I have walked so much,
Loved your shadow so much,
That nothing more is left to me of you.
All that remains to me is to be the shadow among shadows
To be a hundred times more of a shadow than the shadow
To be the shadow that will come and come again into
your sunny life.

A circular plaque on the floor of the underground chamber is inscribed: "They went to the other side of the world and did not return." A "flame of eternal hope" burns and The Tomb of the Unknown Deportee bears the inscription: "Dedicated to the living memory of the 200,000 French deportees that sank in the night and the fog, exterminated in the Nazi concentration camps." At the exit to the chamber is the injunction, engraved, found at all sites memorializing the victims of the Nazis: "Forgive but never forget."

== Reception ==
Architectural Digest included the memorial in its list of the "Ten Most Significant Memorial Buildings" and said, "Rather than rising heroically, the memorial is meant to evoke the unspeakable, anonymous drama of deportation—its entrance a descending stairway." Fodor's called the memorial "stark" and "evocative". The Guardian published a description by one of its readers, who noted the memorial's obscurity and called it "small, stark and savagely detailed... which goes unnoticed by the thousands of tourists who take selfies of themselves in front of the adjoining cathedral every day. It is a place for tears and quiet contemplation; a refuge from the crowds and a reminder of one of the darkest episodes in recent history."

== Criticism ==
According to Peter Carrier, author of Holocaust Monuments and National Memory Cultures in France and Germany Since 1989, the memorial lacks specific references to Jewish victims, and "its dedication to 'the two hundred thousands French martyrs who died in the deportation camps'.. identifying victims as French nationals, distorts the historical record by suggesting that victims died willingly for a national cause rather than as victims of state persecution." He further commented that despite its title, "inscriptions on the interior walls of the memorial account not for the conditions of departure but for the destinations of deportees… [The memorial] therefore symbolically assimilates the specific Jewish memory of the Second World War into national memory." The memorial's abstract appearance prevents those not familiar with French, such as tourists, or those not having read the generic inscription from learning and appreciating the historic truth of the horrendous events of the Jewish Holocaust or the specific contribution of the French Deportation to it. By simply creating a somber WWII related installation the memorial contributes more to forgetting that specific episode of history rather than to preserving it for future generations. Non-European tourists not already familiar with the French Deportation are particularly limited in accessing the memorializing experience by simply visually observing it without having direct contextual clues in the architecture and design to the actual event that contributed to the mass murder of the French Jews.

== See also ==
- Drancy internment camp
- Fondation pour la Mémoire de la Déportation
- List of Holocaust memorials and museums in France
- Military Administration in France (Nazi Germany)
