= Henry Strong (railroad executive) =

- Born: May 2, 1829
- Died: October 21, 1911 (aged 82)
- Children: 9, including Gordon Strong

Henry Strong (May 2, 1829 - October 21, 1911) was the seventh president of the Atchison, Topeka and Santa Fe Railway.

== Biography ==
Strong was born in Helensburg, Scotland, the son of Glasgow's Consul General. When he was four years old, he and his family emigrated to the United States. Strong's early employment was in Keokuk and Burlington, Iowa.

Before his tenure as the president, he worked at the Chicago, Burlington and Quincy Railroad. On May 22, 1873, Strong became president of the Atchison, Topeka and Santa Fe Railway. He held the post for about a year and resigned on May 28, 1874.

In 1876, Henry Strong built a summer mansion on the north shore of Lake Geneva, Wisconsin. He reportedly camped at several locations around the lake before deciding to purchase the property where his "Northwoodside" mansion still stands. The land he selected was said to enjoy frequent cooling breezes, a respite from the brutally hot Chicago summers. The home now is part of the famed Wrigley Estate on Lake Geneva.

Preceded by Ginery Twichell	Presidents of the Atchison, Topeka and Santa Fe Railway; 1873 – 1874	Succeeded by Thomas Nickerson
