= Villa Le Lac =

House by Le Corbusier in Corseaux, Switzerland

Villa "Le Lac" Le Corbusier
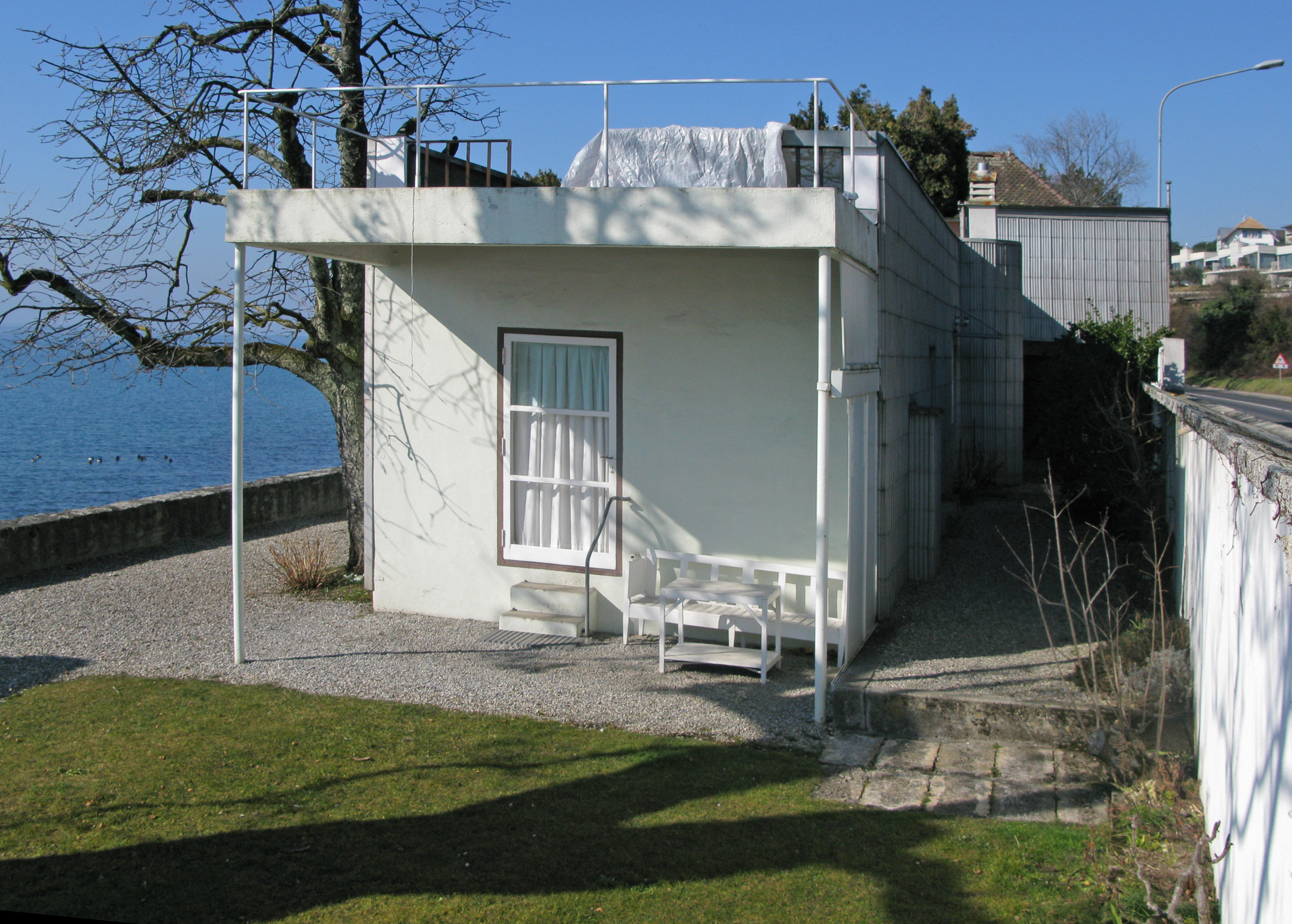

General information
- Address: Route de Lavaux 21 CH-1802
- Town or city: Corseaux
- Country: Switzerland
- Coordinates: 46.46840°N 6.82941°E

Design and construction
- Architect(s): Le Corbusier

UNESCO World Heritage Site
- Official name: Villa "Le Lac" Le Corbusier
- Designated: July 17, 2016
- Reference no.: 1321-002

Swiss Cultural Property of National Significance
- Official name: Villa "Le Lac" Le Corbusier
- Reference no.: 6020

The Villa Le Lac, also known as the Villa "Le Lac" Le Corbusier, is a residential building on Lake Geneva in Corseaux, Canton of Vaud, Switzerland, designed by Swiss architects and cousins Le Corbusier and Pierre Jeanneret between 1923 and 1924 for Le Corbusier's parents. It is an example of residential Modern architecture and showcases three of Le Corbusier's Five Points of Architecture. The building is a designated Swiss Cultural Property of National Significance and was added to the UNESCO World Heritage List in 2016.

== History ==
Between 1912 and 1919 Le Corbusier's parents Georges-Édouard Jeanneret and Marie-Charlotte-Amélie Jeanneret-Perret lived at the Villa Jeanneret-Perret in their hometown La Chaux-de-Fonds, which their son had also designed for them. From 1919 until the Villa Le Lac was constructed, the Jeannerets resided at a chalet in Blonay. They moved to the new villa in Corseaux on Christmas Eve of 1924. Georges-Édouard and Marie-Charlotte-Amélie lived at the villa until their deaths in 1926 and 1960, respectively.

The villa underwent two alterations during Le Corbusier's lifetime: one in 1931, and another in 1951. As part of the 1931 alteration, the north and west façades were covered in the existing galvanized steel sheets, and a northern retaining wall and annex were built. The 1951 alteration consisted of installing the current southern aluminum façade.

In 1971 the Fondation Le Corbusier, a private foundation and archive stewarding Le Corbusier's work which also owns Villa La Roche in Paris and the Villa Jeanneret-Perret, purchased Villa Le Lac. Le Corbusier's brother Albert Jeanneret, a musician, lived at the villa until his death in 1973.

The villa first opened to the public in 1984, according to Le Corbusier's original intentions. In 2010 it became a museum hosting exhibitions related to architecture and Le Corbusier. The Fondation Le Corbusier began restoration work on the building in 2012. The Association Villa "Le Lac" Le Corbusier has managed the property since January 1, 2013. Along with fifteen other buildings around the world designed by Le Corbusier, the Villa Le Lac was designated a UNESCO World Heritage Site in 2016.

== Design ==
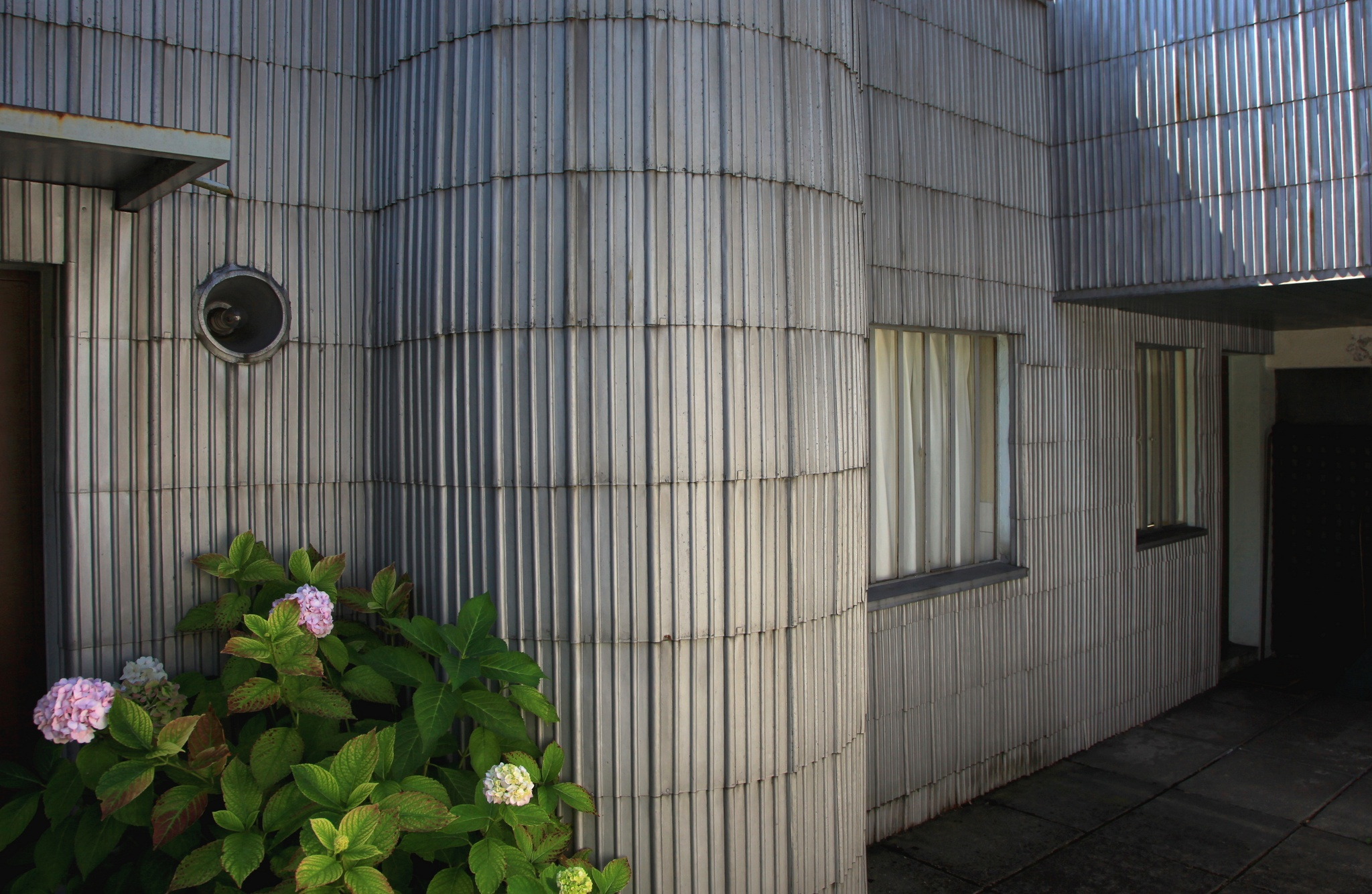
Aluminum southern façade added in 1951

The Villa Le Lac was specifically designed for two elderly people without servants; in this case, Le Corbusier's parents. It measures 64 square metres (690 sq ft) in area, or 4 metres (13 ft) by 16 metres (52 ft), with the longer side following Lake Geneva's coastline. There are about 4 metres of open space between the road and the villa, and again between the villa and the lake.

The building makes use of three of Le Corbusier's Five Points of Architecture: the free plan, the roof terrace, and the horizontally-oriented "ribbon" window. The ribbon window measures 11 metres (36 ft) in length, which was near the possible maximum length for a plate glass window at the time.

== Critical reception ==
Architects and architectural historians widely consider the Villa Le Lac an exemplary Modernist house, along with Le Corbusier's Cabanon de vacances being one of the first in history to deal with the concept of minimalist living or Existenzminimum. This is largely why the building was chosen as a UNESCO World Heritage Site. Writers for the current-day architectural web publication ArchDaily have lauded the building as one of Le Corbusier's finest works, a "must-see."

In 2015—on the occasion of the fiftieth anniversary of Le Corbusier's death—the Association Villa "Le Lac" Le Corbusier sponsored an exhibition at the villa, inviting well-known contemporary architects Mario Botta, Gigon/Guyer, Zaha Hadid, Toyo Ito, Daniel Libeskind, Rafael Moneo, Rudy Ricciotti, SANAA, Álvaro Siza Vieira, and Bernard Tschumi to imagine additions to the building. Some of the architects suggested building parasols over the building, extending it underground or underwater, or lifting it on pilotis (pilotis being another one of Le Corbusier's Five Points of Architecture). Others entirely rejected the notion of adding onto such a small, narrow, and venerated building: Botta only added a boat dock, while Tschumi simply proposed expanding the human usage of the site to include aquatic sports and large parties.
