= Lycée Le Corbusier =

Lycée Le Corbusier may refer to the following schools in France:

- Lycée Le Corbusier - Aubervilliers
- Lycée Le Corbusier - Cormeilles-en-Parisis
- Lycée Le Corbusier - Illkirch-Graffenstaden
- Lycée Le Corbusier - Poissy
- Lycée Le Corbusier - Saint-Étienne-du-Rouvray
