= Point Park Civic Center =

Unbuilt plan in Pittsburgh, Pennsylvania

Coordinates: 40°26′30″N 80°00′43″W

A bird's eye view of Wright's first scheme for the Point Park Civic Center, done in 1947

The Point Park Civic Center was a proposed civic center for downtown Pittsburgh, Pennsylvania, United States, where the confluence of the Allegheny and Monongahela Rivers forms the Ohio River. Frank Lloyd Wright designed the structure on a commission from Edgar J. Kaufmann in the late 1940s. Wright initially envisioned a circular building more than 1,000 feet (300 m) in diameter and 175 feet (53 m) tall. The structure, containing an opera house, sports arena, three movie theaters, and a convention hall, was wrapped by a spiraling strip of road. The plan expressed Wright's insistence on bringing the automobile into the social setting. It did not find favor with Pittsburgh authorities.

To make the design more palatable to its audience, Wright developed a radically different proposal for a monolithic tower supporting bridges across the Allegheny and Monongahela. This too was unsuccessful, and none of Wright's work for the site was ever built. The site is now occupied by Point State Park. Elements of Wright's plan contain similarities to other Wright designs, including the Solomon R. Guggenheim Museum and his unrealized plans for Monona Terrace.

== Background and commission ==
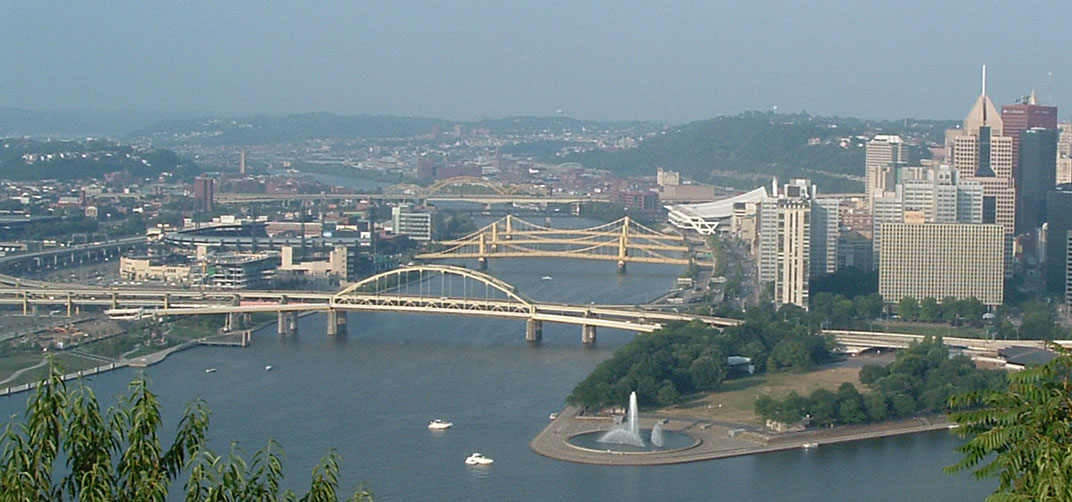
Pittsburgh today. The tip of the Golden Triangle, with its fountain, is in the lower right. At center is the Allegheny River, one of the two rivers that Wright's bridges would have spanned (the Monongahela River is at the extreme lower right).

In the 1930s and 1940s, Pittsburgh sought to revitalize its downtown Point area, at the tip of what is known as the "Golden Triangle". The site offers what Richard Cleary describes as "extraordinary views" along three intersecting rivers; architectural historian Neil Levine states that it is "one of the most spectacular [sites] offered by any American city".

=== History of the site ===
During the city's early history, the Point became a hub for industry and transportation. By the 1930s it was occupied by warehouses and railroad yards. Wright commented in 1935 that the city had wasted the potential of its rivers and hilly landscape. By 1945 the situation was even worse; during the Great Depression and World War II, urban decay had made substantial inroads. The total assessed property value in the Golden Triangle was at a record low and falling. At the point, rarely used railroad facilities included 15 acres (6.1 ha) of yards and half a mile (800 m) of elevated train tracks.

City leaders wanted to alleviate traffic congestion in the city. The Manchester Bridge and Point Bridge met at the point in a way that left no room for the interchange required by the volume of traffic. The growth of the city had made parking a serious problem as well. Robert Moses, who had developed the traffic scheme for New York City, was brought in and published a traffic plan in 1939. He offered a circular park surrounded by approach roads connecting the bridges to the city. His plan retained the existing bridges, but most of the experts brought in to examine the problem called for the bridges to be relocated away from the Point, which would create more space for adjoining access roads and interchanges.

Although the site had substantial problems, Robert Alberts observes that "the condition, in the view of the city planner, was almost perfect". The Point had few property owners who needed to be bought out, few residents who would need relocation, and few structures worth preserving. Architects and planners could treat it as a tabula rasa.

=== Plans for development ===
During the course of the Second World War, federal and local authorities established three goals for the site: "the creation of a park commemorating the site's history, improved traffic circulation through the construction of new roads and bridges, and designation of a portion of the site for new office buildings, intended to stimulate private interest in the Golden Triangle". The Allegheny Conference on Community Development became a driving force for these changes. Edgar Kaufmann, a Pittsburgh department store owner, sat on the board of the Conference and became chair of the 28-member committee convened to look into the Point Park problem.

Kaufmann wanted a plan for the Point that was more urbanized than the park others were imagining. In particular, Kaufmann was a major supporter of Pittsburgh Civic Light Opera and wanted to provide that group with a permanent building. He brought in Frank Lloyd Wright, by that time a preeminent architect, who had done numerous other projects for Kaufmann in the past, including Kaufmann's landmark home at Fallingwater and an unbuilt design for a parking garage.

Kaufmann met with Wright in the middle of 1945, and suggested the following specifications for a design: 280,000 square feet (26,000 square metres) of office space, 100,000 square feet (9,300 square metres) of exhibition space, a sports arena and amphitheater, and parking for all these facilities. The two men agreed on a fee of $10,000 ($ 170,000 in 2024), which was paid several weeks after the meeting. Cleary describes Wright as "enthused" by the concept.

== Cantilever development ==
=== Plans for the megastructure ===
By April 1947, Wright finished his first set of architectural drawings for the site. Wright's first concept, which he presented under the title "For the Allegheny Conference—Cantilever Development in Automobile-Scale of Point Park, Pittsburgh", called for a circular concrete and steel building of mammoth dimensions: one-fifth of a mile (300 m) in diameter and 175 feet (53 metres) tall, the building would be capable of holding one-third of the city's population. The entire structure was wrapped by a spiraling roadway that Wright called the "Grand Auto Ramp", which accommodated traffic in both directions and would have been four and a half miles (7.2 km) long. Wright's drawings for the project were enormous: Levine describes them as "over eight feet [2.5 m] long by almost five feet [1.5 m] high".

The decks of the Grand Auto Ramp were to be cantilevered from piers of reinforced concrete. The ramp enclosed the interior space, forming what Cleary describes as a vast atrium. Inside are individual structures supported by pylons, containing the main facilities of the building: the theaters, opera house, arena, and planetarium. Bridges and platforms connected the interior structures. A winter garden and gardens were to have been on the roof. The main structure was to be flanked by "Fast Ramps": ramps with a much narrower radius than the main ramp that allowed rapid movement from the higher levels of the Grand Auto Ramp to the bottom of the building. Wright's expressed philosophy for the scheme was to provide a "newly spacious means of entertainment for the citizen seated in his motor car Winter or Summer. A pleasurable use of that modern instrument is here designed instead of allowing it to remain the troublesome burden it has now become to the City."

A projection from the central building toward the Point terminated in a 500-foot (150 m) tower, equipped for light shows. Multi-decked bridges over the Allegheny and Monongahela were attached to the central building. Pedestrians, cars, and trucks would cross on separate decks. Both bridges passed beneath the central structure, where traffic interchanges allowed travelers to head into the city, across either of the bridges, or up into the Civic Center itself. Open spaces on the site were occupied by parks, an outdoor concert area built to accommodate 15,000 people, and a zoo.

Low buildings along the river added office space. A second large circular building at the Point would have contained a restaurant, pools for swimming and wading, a dock for pleasure boats, and an aquarium. The aquatic specimens were to be enclosed in glass spheres which could be viewed from above and below.

Wright's plans were conspicuous in their detailed development of a project so sweeping. Levine notes that "no previous megastructure in the history of modern architecture came close to this one in terms of size, contents, or coherence".

=== Reaction of the Allegheny Conference ===
Wright's presentation of this plan to the Allegheny Conference in the spring of 1947 was unsuccessful, primarily because of concerns about the plan's economic viability and architectural feasibility. In a meeting with conference officials at Taliesin West, Wright seemed uninterested in how traffic access to the bridges would be handled, and when asked how much the project would cost, he answered that he did not care. When the officials returned to Pittsburgh to meet with Kaufmann they recommended against Wright's scheme; Kaufmann decided not to show the plans to the rest of the committee.

The plan conflicted with existing plans—already confirmed by the state legislature—to build a park at the site that would preserve the historic structures and artifacts there, such as the Fort Pitt blockhouse dating back to 1764. Proposals also existed to rebuild Fort Pitt itself. Wright, however, felt that the urge to preserve was misplaced: "As I see it, Pittsburgh needs no such Historian. Pittsburgh needs imaginative creative sympathy for the living and I am eager to do something constructive and joy-giving for the Pittsburgh people. I thought that was my commission."

== Scheme II ==
=== Features of the second plan ===
A sketch of Wright's second scheme for the Point Park Civic Center

Following the failure of his first design, Wright agreed to retool, and on January 4, 1948, officials of the Allegheny Conference visited Wright's studio at Taliesin West to hear him present a new scheme. The major building from the original design was replaced by a tower called the Bastion, which was to be 1,000 feet (300 metres) tall. Two cable-stayed bridges across the Allegheny and Monongahela emerged from the arrowhead-shaped structure, which would contain a large traffic interchange. The pavilion at the Point was retained, and the outline of the original megastructure became a circular promenade.

The central tower offered a viewing platform and included a television and radio antenna. It would have been equipped to project light and sound spectacles, like the tower in the original scheme. Levine asserts that the Bastion would have provided Pittsburgh a structure similar to the Eiffel Tower, both an observation tower and a landmark symbol of the city, but Robert Alberts notes that "such viewing towers make sense in a city built on a flat terrain, but Pittsburgh already had a high view from a nearby mountain top".

The stayed-cable design employed by the two bridges was only just coming into vogue in the post-World War II era. Further, the bridges were to be built using segments of pre-stressed concrete, another emerging technology. The expertise for the innovative bridge concepts found in both schemes probably came from Czech engineer Jaroslav Polivka, whom Wright had hired to assist in calculations for the Guggenheim Museum. In 1947–48, Polivka promoted, and was later joined by Wright in developing, an idea for a concrete bridge spanning San Francisco Bay.

=== Ultimate rejection ===
Wright's redesign did not win over the Allegheny Conference authorities. One official, Park Martin, wrote to Kaufmann that "to do what Mr. Wright has portrayed would cost a minimum of $100,000,000 and would probably run more." Wallace Richards reported that "Wright himself admits that Project II would cost not less than $150,000,000. In turn he feels that Project I would be in the neighborhood of $400,000,000." These cost figures ($1.31 billion, $1.96 billion and $5.23 billion respectively in 2024) were far beyond what the city was willing to pay. Both men, however, praised Wright's ideas; Richards comments that "what he has conceived for Point Park is magnificent." Kaufmann later wrote Wright asking him to consider doing a much more limited design for an opera house on the Point. Wright did some preliminary sketches, but by June 30, 1948, Kaufmann told him to stop work. Wright's involvement in the redevelopment of the Point ended.

He would later criticize the role that cost considerations played in the rejection of his scheme, stating, "You're building a $100,000,000 highway [the Penn-Lincoln Parkway] here ... Is it impractical to spend several hundred million to further your culture which will survive good or bad long after the Parkway has collapsed?" Cleary says that Wright enjoyed "being an outsider occupying the moral high ground", a position that would cause his clients to grant him the mantle of "absolute authority and faith", permitting him to avoid "compromises which he was not prepared to endure". Though Kaufmann was willing to grant Wright such a position, the city's other political leaders were seeking "team players who would fit into the system they had constructed rather than prophets who would shake its foundations."

Ultimately, the site was turned into a park with historic and recreational aspects, Point State Park. The Fort Pitt blockhouse remained intact, and three of the five bastions of the fort have been restored. The state acquired almost all the property for the site by 1949, at a cost of $7,588,500 ($100 million in 2024), and the park was finally completed in 1974. Areas adjoining the park were condemned to permit commercial development, most notably Gateway Center.

== Place in Wright's oeuvre ==
Frank Lloyd Wright championed the “disappearing city", in which congested, polluted urban centers would spread out into a decentralized country in which the fruits of nature and the country would be more easily accessible. Cleary attests that there appears to be a contradiction between this vision and a proposal to create a building that could contain over 100,000 people in an exceedingly dense fashion. As a solution he points to the idea that Wright "conceived the Point Park Coney Island less as part of urban Pittsburgh than as one of his 'automobile objectives' of Broadacre City". Broadacre City was the best-developed example of Wright's plan for America; the automobile objectives were civic centers that incorporated the automobile directly into the social experience. For instance, the Gordon Strong Automobile Objective, designed by Wright in 1924, included as its main feature a spiraling ramp that wrapped around a domed planetarium, which was built on the top of a mountain. By driving to the top, citizens could enjoy the sweeping views and visit stores and restaurants inside the complex.

Aside from its similarity to the Gordon Strong project, Wright's design for the Point Civic Center recalled the ideas that fuelled his 1938 plan for Monona Terrace in Madison, Wisconsin, and his 1939 plan for the Crystal Heights residential and retail center in Washington, D.C. Both were large, multi-function structures that incorporated parking, shops, and recreation in one facility.

== See also ==
- List of Frank Lloyd Wright works

== Notes ==
1. Cleary, Merchant Prince and Master Builder, 53–55.
2. Levine, "Frank Lloyd Wright as Urbanist"
3. Alberts, 57.
4. Cleary, "Edgar J. Kaufmann, Frank Lloyd Wright", 145.
5. Alberts, 63.
6. Cleary, "Edgar J. Kaufmann, Frank Lloyd Wright", 144.
7. Cleary, "Edgar J. Kaufmann, Frank Lloyd Wright", 145.
8. A combination of material from Cleary, Merchant Prince and Master Builder, 55–57 and Alberts, 91.
9. Cleary, Merchant Prince and Master Builder, 57.
10. Alberts, 92.
11. Levine, "Frank Lloyd Wright as Urbanist"
12. Cleary, Merchant Prince and Master Builder, 57–58.
13. Alberts, 95.
14. Cleary, "Edgar J. Kaufmann, Frank Lloyd Wright", 145-146.
15. Cleary, Merchant Prince and Master Builder, 57–58.
16. Levine, "Frank Lloyd Wright as Urbanist"
17. Alberts, 97.
18. Cleary, "Edgar J. Kaufmann, Frank Lloyd Wright", 148.
19. Cleary, "Edgar J. Kaufmann, Frank Lloyd Wright", 149.
20. Alberts, 54.
21. Cleary, Merchant Prince and Master Builder, 158.
22. Cleary, "Edgar J. Kaufmann, Frank Lloyd Wright", 152.
23. Cleary, "Edgar J. Kaufmann, Frank Lloyd Wright", 153.
24. Cleary, "Edgar J. Kaufmann, Frank Lloyd Wright", 154.
25. Cleary, "Edgar J. Kaufmann, Frank Lloyd Wright", 155.
26. Charles W. Prine, Jr. "City Must Decide by End of Year to Get Aid from U.S." Pittsburgh Sun-Telegraph, February 4, 1952. Quoted in Cleary, Edgar J. Kaufmann, 158.
27. Cleary, "Edgar J. Kaufmann, Frank Lloyd Wright", 158.
28. Alberts, 101. Alberts's book provides a more complete history of the site's subsequent development.
29. Wright, The Disappearing City, passim.
30. Cleary, Merchant Prince and Master Builder, 59
31. See a summary of this project at the Library of Congress website.
32. Cleary, Merchant Prince and Master Builder, 62–63
