= Villa Jeanneret =

House in Paris designed by Le Corbusier

Coordinates: 48°51′07″N 2°15′55″E

General information
- Location: Paris, France
- Completed: 1923–25

Design and construction
- Architect(s): Le Corbusier

UNESCO World Heritage Site
- Official name: The Architectural Work of Le Corbusier, an Outstanding Contribution to the Modern Movement
- Type: Cultural
- Criteria: i, ii, vi
- Designated: 2016 (40th session)
- Part of: Maison La Roche et Jeanneret
- Reference no.: 1321-001

Villa Jeanneret and Villa La Roche are two houses in Paris, designed by Le Corbusier and Pierre Jeanneret in 1923–1925 and renovated by Charlotte Perriand in 1928. No longer inhabited, they house the Fondation Le Corbusier museum and archives. They are located at 8-10 square du Docteur-Blanche, 16th arrondissement, Paris. Villa Jeanneret is not open to the public.

In July 2016, the house, Villa La Roche, and several other works by Le Corbusier were inscribed as UNESCO World Heritage Sites.

== History ==
The Villa Jeanneret was commissioned by Le Corbusier's brother, Albert Jeanneret, and his fiancée Lotti Raaf. It forms part of a joint project with the connected Villa La Roche – the original scheme involved more houses and more clients, but it was only Jeanneret and La Roche that stayed the course and saw their villas built.

=== Design and construction ===
The program included a salon, dining room, bedrooms, a study, a kitchen, a maid's room and a garage. The site faced north, and zoning restrictions prevented windows looking over the surrounding back gardens. It was therefore necessary to let light in by creating light courts, a terrace and skylights. At the roof is a roof terrace, similar to the deck of a ship.
