= Waldwisse =

- Commune
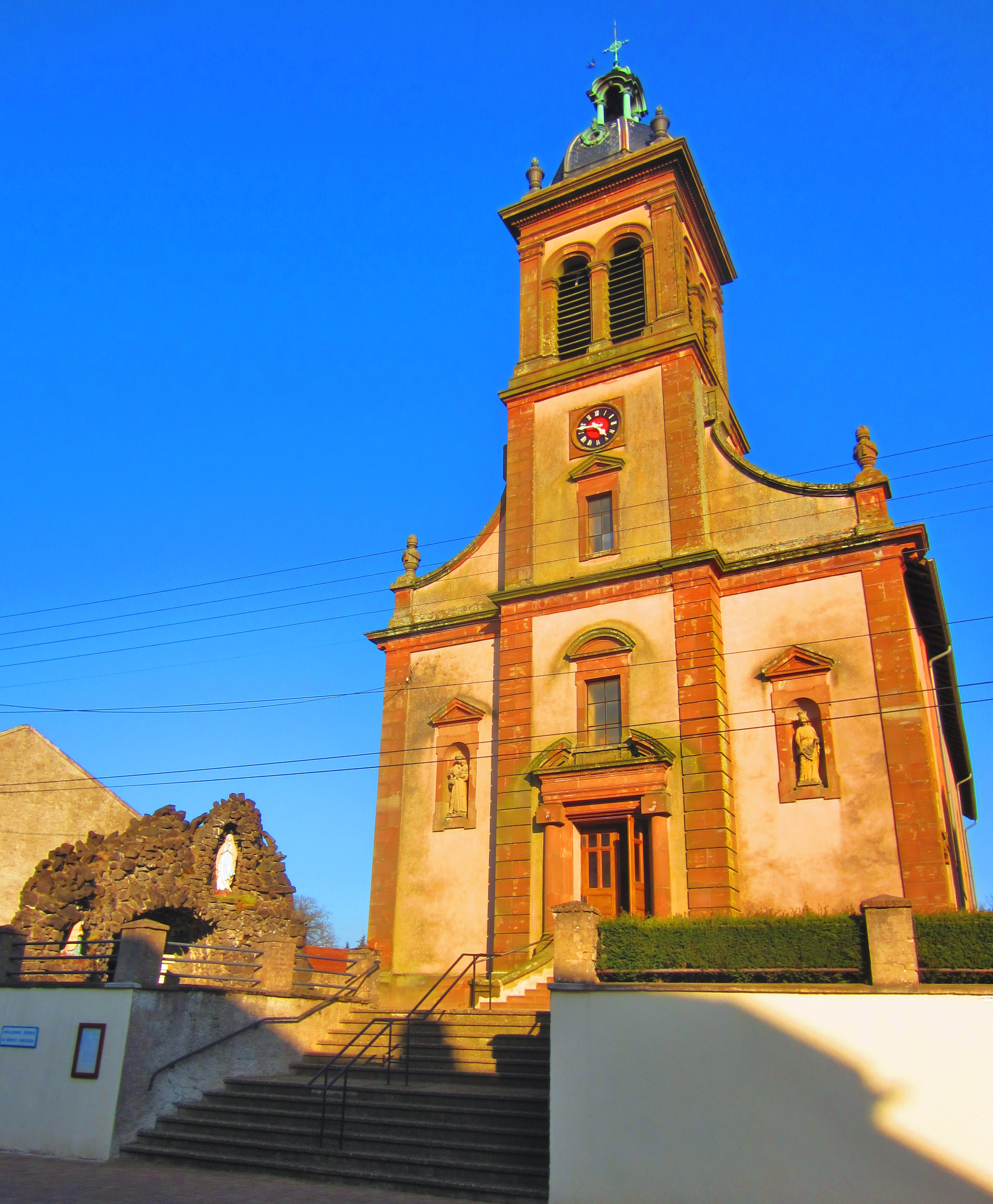
- The church in Waldwisse

- Coat of arms
- Location of Waldwisse
- Location within France Location within Grand Est
- Coordinates: 49°24′51″N 6°31′50″E
- Country: France
- Region: Grand Est
- Department: Moselle
- Arrondissement: Thionville
- Canton: Bouzonville
- Intercommunality: Bouzonvillois-Trois Frontières

Government
  - Mayor (2020–2026): Jean-Guy Magard
- Area^{1}: 11.74 km^{2} (4.53 sq mi)
- Elevation: 290 m (950 ft)
- Highest elevation: 374 m (1,227 ft)
- Lowest elevation: 247 m (810 ft)
- Population (2023): 804
  - Density: 68.5/km^{2} (177/sq mi)
- Time zone: UTC+01:00 (CET)
  - Summer (DST): UTC+02:00 (CEST)
- INSEE/Postal code: 57740 /57480
- ^{1} French Land Register data, which excludes lakes, ponds, glaciers > 1 km^{2} (0.386 sq mi or 247 acres) and river estuaries.

Waldwisse (French pronunciation: [valdvis]; German: Waldwiese; Lorraine Franconian: Waldwiss/Wiiss) is a commune in the Moselle department in Grand Est in north-eastern France.

Localities of the commune: Betting, Gongelfang, Henting (German: Bettingen, Gongelfangen, Hintingerhof).

== Population ==
Historical population
Year	Pop.	±% p.a.
1968	656	—
1975	605	−1.15%
1982	596	−0.21%
1990	605	+0.19%
1999	659	+0.95%
2007	672	+0.24%
2012	772	+2.81%
2017	824	+1.31%
2023	804	−0.41%
Source: INSEE

== See also ==
- Communes of the Moselle department
