= Marie Nivouliès de Pierrefort =

French-Brazilian impressionist painter (1879-1968

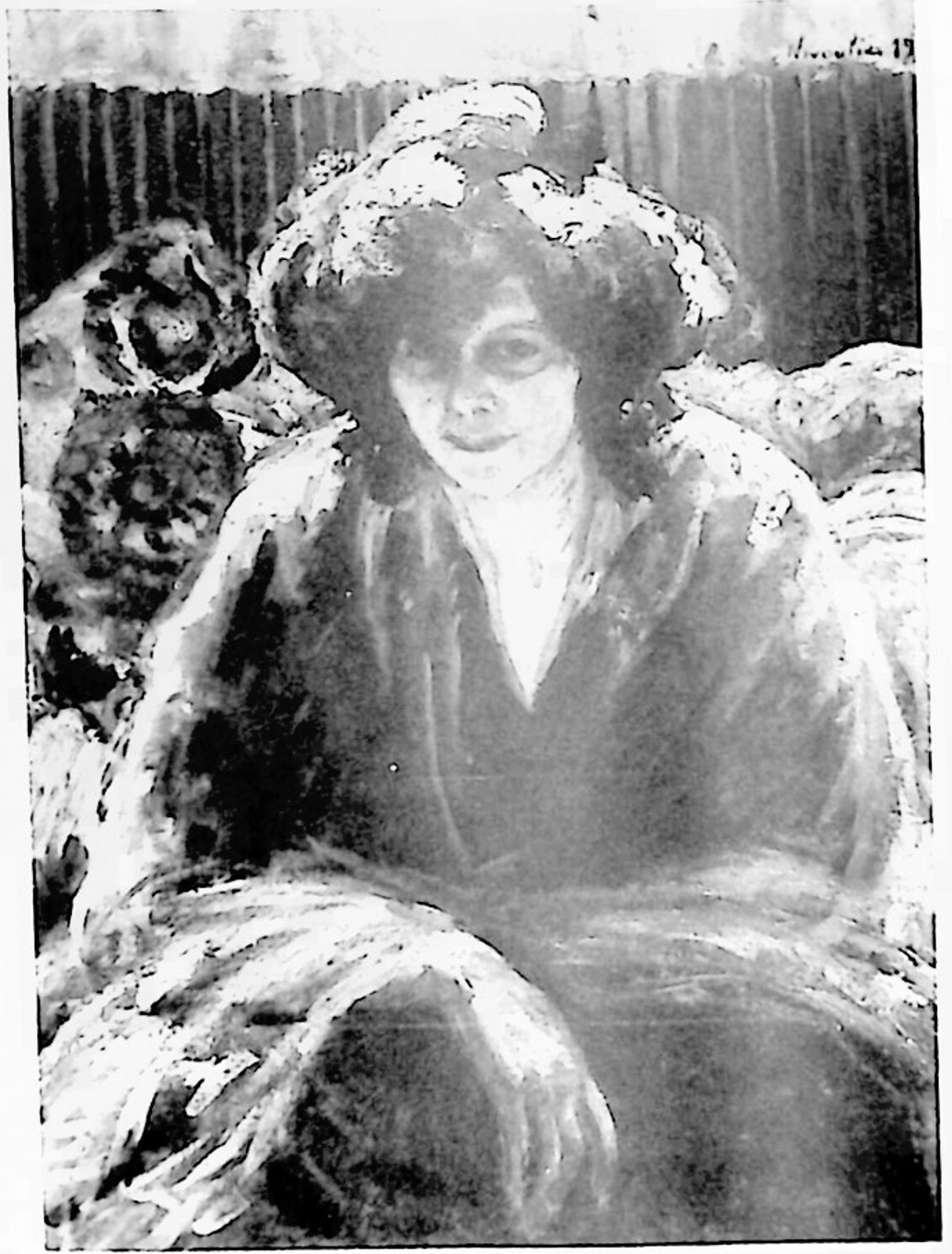
- Self-portrait, 1913
- Born: January 6, 1879; Toulon
- Died: December 24, 1968 (aged 89); Rio de Janeiro
- Occupation: Painter
- Spouse(s): Paul Ternisien

Marie Anne Alphonsine Nivouliès de Pierrefort (January 6, 1879 – December 24, 1968) was a French impressionist painter. She spent most of the last thirty years of her life living and painting in Brazil.

Marie Nivouliès de Pierrefort was born on January 6, 1879, in Toulon. She was educated at the Ursuline Convent in Chavagne and won a scholarship to study at the École des Beaux-Arts in Paris, where she studied under Ferdinand Humbert. She received another scholarship which allowed her to travel to and paint in Tunis.

Nivoulies exhibited at the Salon des Indépendants beginning in 1907 and the Salon de la Société Nationale des Beaux-Arts beginning in 1910. Among her works is a depiction of a scene from L'Arlésienne by Georges Bizet which hangs in the foyer of the Toulon Opera.

In 1911, she married musician Paul Ternisien, a student of César Franck. They had a son who died at the age of seven.

In 1923, the couple asked Le Corbusier to design a house for them on a small triangular piece of land in Boulogne-sur-Seine. It was constructed by an experienced contractor and resulted in a decade of acrimonious lawsuits and letters. The Ternisiens went bankrupt and the house was demolished in 1935.

In 1938 the couple moved Paquetá Island in Rio de Janeiro. Paul Ternisien died in 1944 and, after returning to France from 1950 to 1959, she lived the rest of her life in Brazil She painted landscapes and seascapes of Brazil, exhibiting her work at the Museu Nacional de Belas Artes in 1946 and 1956 as well as a number of group exhibitions. After her death in 1968, her student Sergio Telles exhibited and promoted her work.
