= Fondation Le Corbusier =

Private foundation honoring the work of architect Le Corbusier

Fondation Le Corbusier is a private foundation and archive honoring the work of architect Le Corbusier. It operates Maison La Roche, a museum located in the 16th arrondissement at 8-10, square du Dr Blanche, Paris, France, which is open daily except Sunday. The Maison La Roche was temporarily closed for renovation in 2008–2009.

== History ==
The Fondation Le Corbusier was established in 1968. It now owns Villa La Roche and Villa Jeanneret (which form the foundation's headquarters), as well as the apartment occupied by Le Corbusier from 1933 to 1965 at rue Nungesser et Coli in Paris 16e, and Villa Le Lac, which he built for his parents in Corseaux on the shores of Lac Leman (1924).

== Building ==
Maison La Roche and Maison Jeanneret (1923–24), also known as the La Roche-Jeanneret house, is a pair of semi-detached houses that was Corbusier's third commission in Paris. They are laid out at right angles to each other, with iron, concrete, and blank, white facades setting off a curved two-story gallery space. Maison La Roche is now a museum containing about 8,000 original drawings, studies and plans by Le Corbusier (in collaboration with Pierre Jeanneret from 1922 to 1940), as well as about 450 of his paintings, about 30 enamels, about 200 other works on paper, and a sizable collection of written and photographic archives. It describes itself as the world's largest collection of Le Corbusier drawings, studies, and plans.

== See also ==
- Raoul Albert La Roche (Swiss donator and collector of art)
- Villa La Roche
- List of single-artist museums
