= Villa La Roche =

House by Le Corbusier in Paris

Coordinates: 48.8519°N 2.2653°E

General information
- Location: 10, square du Docteur Blanche 75016, Paris, France
- Completed: 1923–25
- Owner: Fondation Le Corbusier

Design and construction
- Architect: Le Corbusier

UNESCO World Heritage Site
- Official name: The Architectural Work of Le Corbusier, an Outstanding Contribution to the Modern Movement
- Type: Cultural
- Criteria: i, ii, vi
- Designated: 2016 (40th session)
- Part of: Maison La Roche et Jeanneret
- Reference no.: 1321-001

Villa La Roche, also Maison La Roche, is a house in Paris, designed by Le Corbusier and his cousin Pierre Jeanneret in 1923–1925. It was designed for Raoul La Roche, a Swiss banker from Basel and collector of avant-garde art. Villa La Roche now houses the Fondation Le Corbusier.

La Roche commissioned Le Corbusier to build a villa as well as a gallery to house his art collection.

In July 2016, the house, Villa Jeanneret, and sixteen other works by Le Corbusier were inscribed as UNESCO World Heritage Sites.

== Design and construction ==
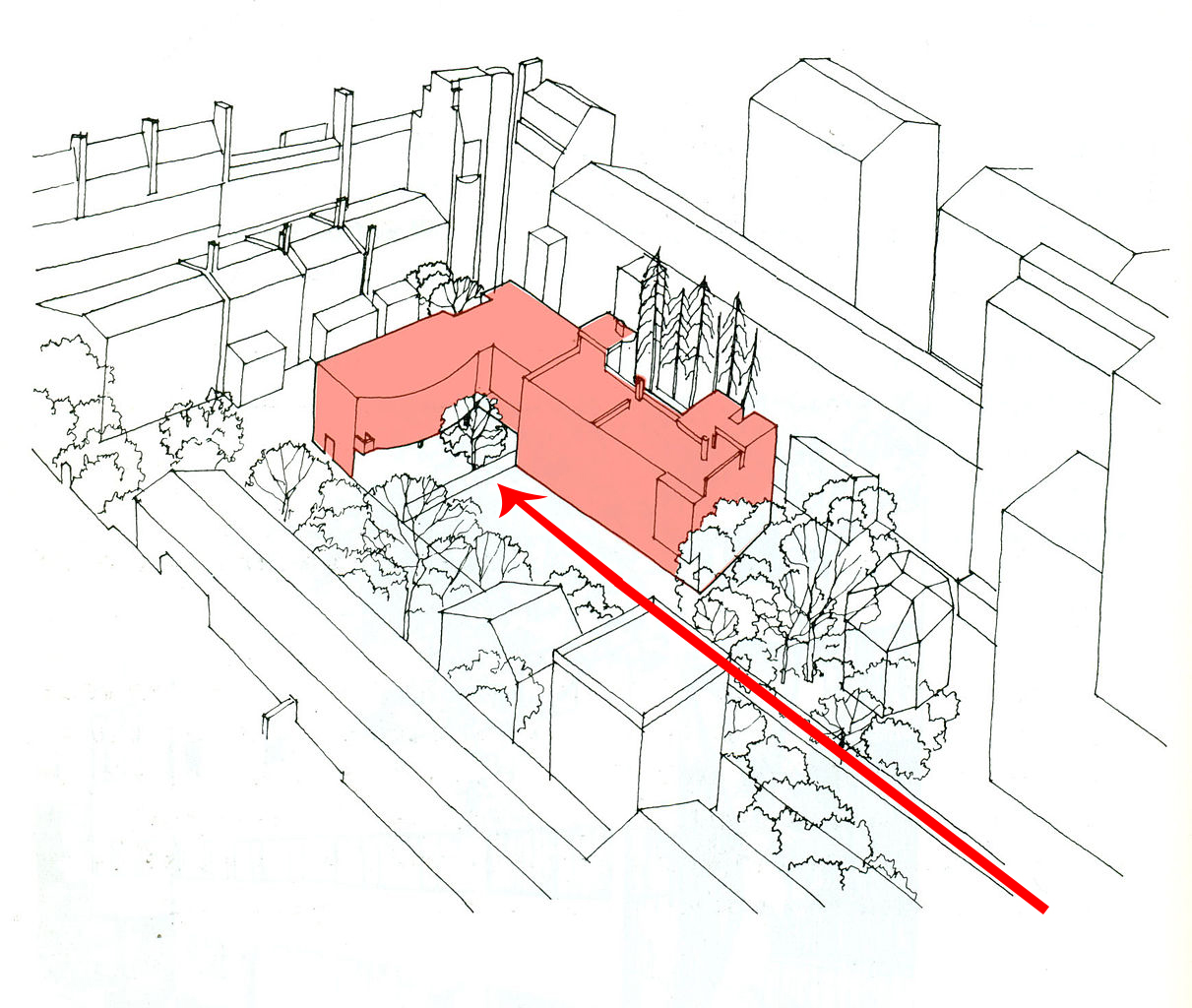
Axonometric sketch of the house in its urban context

La Roche-Jeanneret house, is a pair of semi-detached houses that was Corbusier's third commission in Paris. They are laid out at right angles to each other. The house exhibits cubist art and purism. The house is designed to be experiential and viewed from a single, fixed point. The use of reinforced concrete allowed for a choice of material for the facade, pilotis, long windows, and a terrace garden on a roof. Maison La Roche was widely photographed starting in the late 1920s. The first restoration commenced in the 1970s. The Villa La Roche was listed as a historic monument in 1996 and in 2016 the complex was included on the UNESCO’s World Heritage List.

== Furniture ==
In 1928, Le Corbusier and Perriand collaborated on furniture, the fruits of their collaboration were first done for Villa La Roche. The furniture items include, three chrome-plated tubular steel chairs designed for two of his projects, The Maison la Roche in Paris and a pavilion for Barbara and Henry Church.

== Museum ==
Maison La Roche is now a museum containing about 8,000 original drawings, studies and plans by Le Corbusier (in collaboration with Pierre Jeanneret from 1922 to 1940), as well as approximately, 450 of his paintings, 30 enamels, 200 works on paper, and a sizeable collection of written and photographic archives. It describes itself as the world's largest collection of Le Corbusier drawings, studies, and plans.

== See also ==
- Raoul Albert La Roche (Swiss donator and collector of art)
- Fondation Le Corbusier
