= Elsie Driggs =

American painter

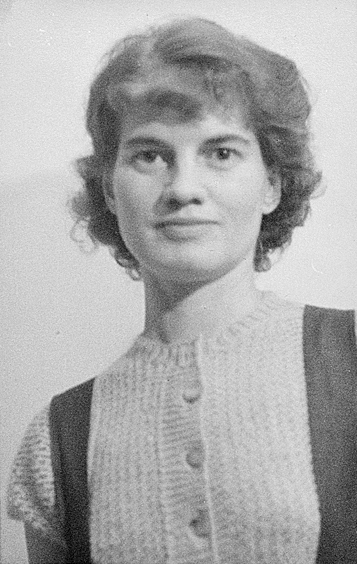
- Elsie Driggs, 1927
- Born: 1898; Hartford, Connecticut, US
- Died: July 12, 1992 (aged 93–94); New York City, US
- Education: Art Students League of New York
- Known for: Painting
- Movement: Precisionism
- Spouse: Lee Gatch (m. 1935; died in 1968)

Elsie Driggs (1898 – July 12, 1992 in New York City) was an American painter known for her contributions to Precisionism, America's one indigenous modern-art movement before Abstract Expressionism, and for her later floral and figurative watercolors, pastels, and oils. She was the only female participant in the Precisionist movement, which in the 1920s and 1930s took a Cubist-inspired approach to painting the skyscrapers and factories that had come to define the new American landscape. Her works are in the collection of the Whitney Museum of American Art, the Houston Museum of the Fine Arts, the Fine Arts Museums of San Francisco, the James A. Michener Art Museum in Pennsylvania, and the Columbus Museum of Art, among others. She was married to the American abstract artist Lee Gatch.

== Career ==
Born in Hartford, Connecticut, Driggs grew up in New Rochelle, a suburb of New York City, in a family that was supportive of her artistic interests. After a summer spent painting with her sister in New Mexico in her late teens, she felt she had found her life's calling. At twenty, she enrolled in classes at the Art Students League of New York, where she studied under George Luks and Maurice Sterne, both of whom were charismatic, inspirational figures in her early life. She also attended the evening criticism classes held at the home of painter John Sloan. Driggs spent fourteen months in Europe from late 1922 to early 1924, drawing and studying Italian art. There she met Leo Stein, first in Paris and later in Florence, who became an important intellectual influence, and who urged her to study Cézanne. He also introduced her to the works of Piero della Francesca, the Renaissance artist for whom she felt throughout her life the greatest admiration.

Driggs eventually settled in New York City, where she found representation with the progressive Charles Daniel Gallery. (Advised that the old-fashioned and misogynistic Daniel would be unlikely to take on a woman artist, she signed the works she left for his consideration simply "Driggs" and waited to meet him in person until he had expressed his eagerness to include her in his gallery.) In sympathy with those artists Daniel represented who were part of the burgeoning Precisionist movement, such as Charles Demuth, Charles Sheeler, George Ault, Niles Spencer, and Preston Dickinson, she too painted "the modern landscape of factories, bridges, and skyscrapers with geometric precision and almost abstract spareness." Impressionism and academic or Ashcan realism represented the past, in Driggs' view, and she intended to be resolutely modern. She was an attractive and engaging woman, but her demeanor belied a strong ambition and a clear sense of what it would take to make her mark in the New York art world. Driggs was part of the pre-eminent first group of Precisionist painters, including Demuth and Sheeler, who exhibited at the Daniel Gallery in the 1920s. Although a later group of Precisionist painters, including Louis Lozowick, Ralston Crawford and others, came on the American Art scene during the 1930s, Driggs felt that the style came to an end with the 1929 stock market crash.

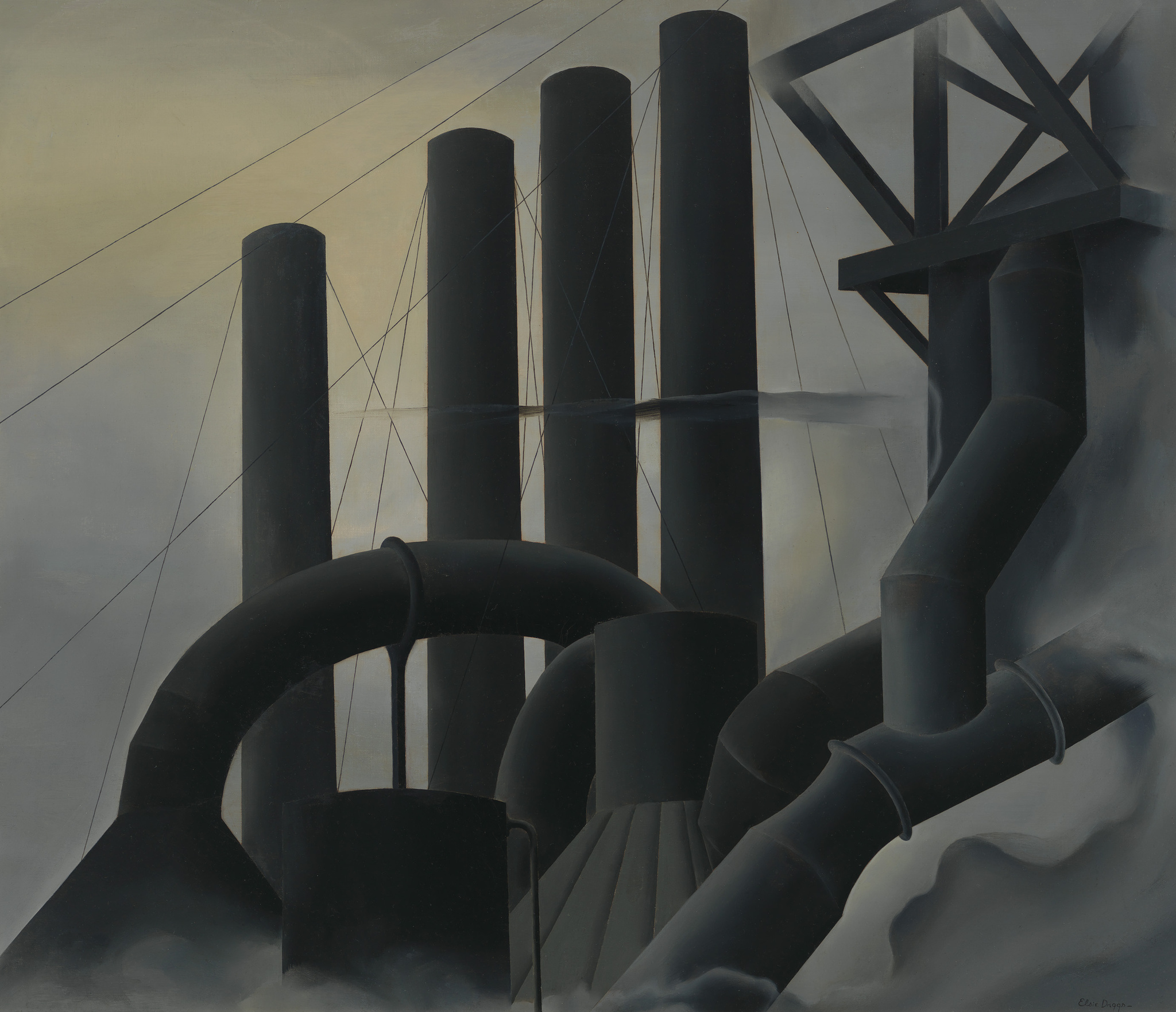
Pittsburgh, 1927

In 1926 she painted her most famous work, Pittsburgh, a dark and brooding picture now in the permanent collection of the Whitney Museum of American Art, which depicts the gargantuan smokestacks of the Jones & Laughlin steel mills in Pittsburgh. Its focus is an overpowering mass of black and gray smokestacks, thick piping, and crisscrossing wires with only clouds of smoke to relieve the severity of the image, yet it was an image in which she found an ironic beauty. She called the picture "my El Greco" and expressed surprise that viewers in later years interpreted the painting as a work of social criticism. Like the other Precisionists (e.g., Demuth, Charles Sheeler, Louis Lozowick, Stefan Hirsch), she was concerned with applying modernist techniques to renderings of the new industrial and urban landscape, not in commenting on potential dangers the overly mechanized modern world of 1920s America might present. If anything, Precisionism, like Futurism, was a celebration of man-made energy and technology. One year later, she painted Blast Furnaces, in a similar vein. As noted above, Piero della Francesca's mural depicting "The Story of the True Cross" in Arezzo, with its tubular, static and frozen forms was the major influence on Driggs' "Pittsburgh" (it may have been the major influence for "Blast Furnaces" as well).

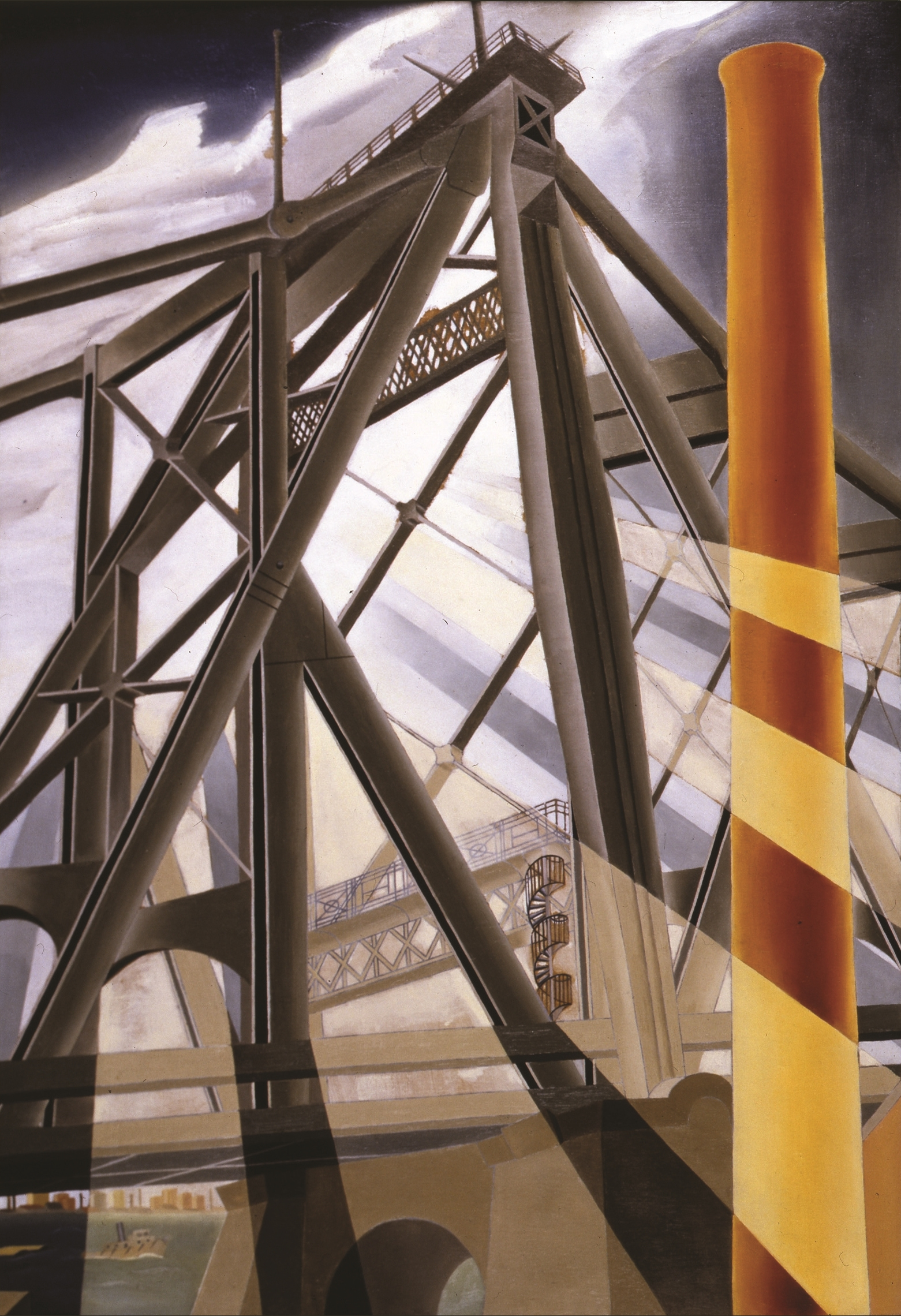
Elsie Driggs, Queensborough Bridge, 1927

After Pittsburgh, Driggs' most acclaimed work was probably Queensborough Bridge (1927), now in the collection of the Montclair Art Museum, depicting shafts of light as rigid Futurist-style "lines of force" sweeping through the massive verticals of the East River bridge, a structure she had studied from her apartment window on Second Avenue. With this painting, art critic Forbes Watson wrote, "Miss Driggs waves goodbye to her old master Maurice Sterne and embraces for the moment the age of machinery." However, Driggs' use of "ray lines" (slender black lines that criss-cross the canvas, recall Precisionist works by Charles Demuth, and particularly his "My Egypt" (also from 1927). Although Driggs and Demuth exhibited at the Daniel Gallery, they never met.

In 1929 Charles Daniel gave Driggs a one-woman show, which included one of her sleekest and most compelling paintings, Aeroplane, now in the collection of the Houston Museum of the Fine Arts. The inspiration for the painting came from Driggs' first experience flying in 1928, when she traveled from Cleveland to Detroit by air. ("Elsie Driggs, following the spirit of the age, has gone up in the air," commented an Art News reviewer. Actually, Driggs went to Detroit to make studies from the Ford Motor Company's River Rouge Plant (Sheeler had preceded her there by a year). It was on this trip that she had made studies of a plane and sat next to the pilot on a shuttle trip from Cleveland to Detroit. This trip resulted in two Precisionist works, "Aeroplane" and "River Rouge." Unfortunately, Driggs' "River Rouge," a major Precisionist work, was lost in a fire. Of course, River Rouge became Sheeler's best-known theme. However Sheeler would later create his version of a plane, "Yankee Clipper", in 1939 (collection of the Rhode Island School of Design, Providence, Rhode Island).

At the same time that Driggs exhibited her Precisionist machine age works at the Daniel Gallery, she was also creating a series depicting plant forms, both in pastel and oil, for the same gallery. In a group exhibition at the Daniel Gallery in 1924, "Chou" (collection of the Montclair Museum) a study of a cabbage, which was larger than life-sized, was displayed with works by Preston Dickenson, Andrew Dasburg and Thomas Hart Benton. The painting earned Driggs rave reviews by such prominent critics as Forbes Watson, who wrote," Elsie Driggs, a newcomer, is a distinct addition to the gallery's group, her painting of the spread out leaves of a cabbage being one of the most sensitive pieces of painting in the entire exhibition." Perhaps Driggs' finest plant form is "Cabbage" of 1927 (private collection), which depicts an uprooted American cabbage swirling in space. This work is slightly larger and more dynamic than "Chou." Here Driggs shows more interest in depicting the crinkly cabbage leaves with botanical accuracy. The abstract, brown and white shaded background recalls contemporaneous paintings by Georgia O'Keeffe, who Driggs was known to meet at least on one occasion.

Driggs also exhibited in group exhibitions at the Whitney Club, the Museum of Modern Art, and the Chicago Art Institute and in the Whitney Museum's first Biennial. Important newspaper critics such as Henry McBride and Margaret Breuning wrote favorably about her work. In 1929 McBride commented, "Elsie Driggs is capable of interesting us in anything in which she herself is interested." When the Daniel gallery closed during the Depression, she was represented by the dealer J.B. Neumann and later by Frank Rehn.

In the 1930s, Driggs, after executing five major Precisionist works, abandoned the style – a decision that she may have later regretted. In fact, she concentrated more on "whimsical watercolors and figurative paintings as well as murals for the PWPA." In 1935, Driggs married painter Lee Gatch. After two winters in New York, the couple moved to rural Lambertville, New Jersey. Driggs dedicated her efforts to Gatch's erratic career and to raising their daughter Merriman. It was a loving but tumultuous marriage and their styles began to directly influence each other. Serendipitously, in 1940, their only child, Merriman, was playing with watercolors and began to rip paper and to paint the pieces. From this, Elsie got the idea of creating watercolor collages, which became a major focus of her work. She then began to create canvas collages, in which she would attach cutout pieces of canvas to a canvas, and then paint over them with oil paint. This idea was picked up by Lee, who began to incorporate the same process in both his paintings and his frames. These were adventurous works, which merit reconsideration.

After Gatch's death in 1968, Driggs returned to New York City. Over the next two decades, she experimented with mixed media constructions and figurative paintings in pastels and oils. The rise of feminist art history brought her renewed attention, and she was the subject of a one-woman show at the Martin Diamond Gallery in 1980 and a retrospective at the New Jersey State Museum in Trenton in 1990. Curated by Thomas Folk, the retrospective exhibition, titled "Elsie Driggs, A Woman of Genius," traveled to the Phillips Collection in Washington DC. And Driggs created two final oil paintings in her Precissionist style, "The Javits Center" in 1986 (private collection) and "Hoboken" of the same year (private collection). She was included in many historical surveys of Precisionism. She continued to follow the contemporary art scene, admiring in particular the work of Helen Frankenthaler and Francis Bacon. She also sided with photographer Robert Mapplethorpe during his controversy at the Corcoran Gallery in Washington DC. At the time of her death in 1992 at the age of ninety-four, Driggs was considered the most underrated as well as the most long-lived of the Precisionist painters. She was interred at Woodlawn Cemetery in the Bronx, New York. Thomas Folk, organized a memorial service and symposium which was held at the Whitney Museum of American Art on August 25, 2002. "Pittsburgh" was proudly displayed on the rear wall of the auditorium.

== Sources ==
- Kimmerle, Constance. Elsie Driggs: The Quick and the Classical. Philadelphia: University of Pennsylvania Press, 2008. Includes essay by Thomas Folk, "Remembering Elsie,' pp. 127-133.
- Loughery, John. "Blending the Classical and the Modern: The Art of Elsie Driggs," Woman's Art Journal (Winter 1987), pp. 22–25.
- Stavitsky, Gail. "Reordering Reality: Precisionist Directions in American Art, 1915-1941". In: Precisionism in America, 1915-1941: Reordering Reality (Diana Murphy, editor). New York: Abrams, 1994.
- Folk, Thomas. Elsie Driggs, A Woman of Genius, New Jersey State Museum, October 13, 1990- January 6, 1991; and traveling to the Phillips Collection, Washington DC, January 26- March 17, 1991.
