= Anna Held Audette =

American artist and author (1938–2013)

- Born: Anna Brita Held; 1938; New York, New York
- Died: June 9, 2013 (aged 74–75)
- Movement: Precisionism
- Website: annaheldaudette.com

Anna Held Audette (1938–2013) was an American painter, printmaker, and educator.

Audette née Held was born New York City in 1938. She was the daughter of art historian Julius S. Held. She attended Smith College and the Yale School of Art.

Audette taught art at the Southern Connecticut State University. She was the author of several books, including The Blank Canvas: Inviting the Muse (1993) and 100 Creative Drawing Ideas (2004).

Audette died on June 9, 2013.

Her work is in the Metropolitan Museum of Art, and the National Gallery of Art.

Posthumous exhibitions include Anna Held Audette: Requiem for the Industrial Age in 2014 at the Housatonic Museum of Art, The Art of Anna Held Audette in 2023 at the American Precision Museum, and Abandon in Place: The Worlds of Anna Audette in 2023 at the Florence Griswold Museum.
