= Francis Criss =

American painter (1901–1973)

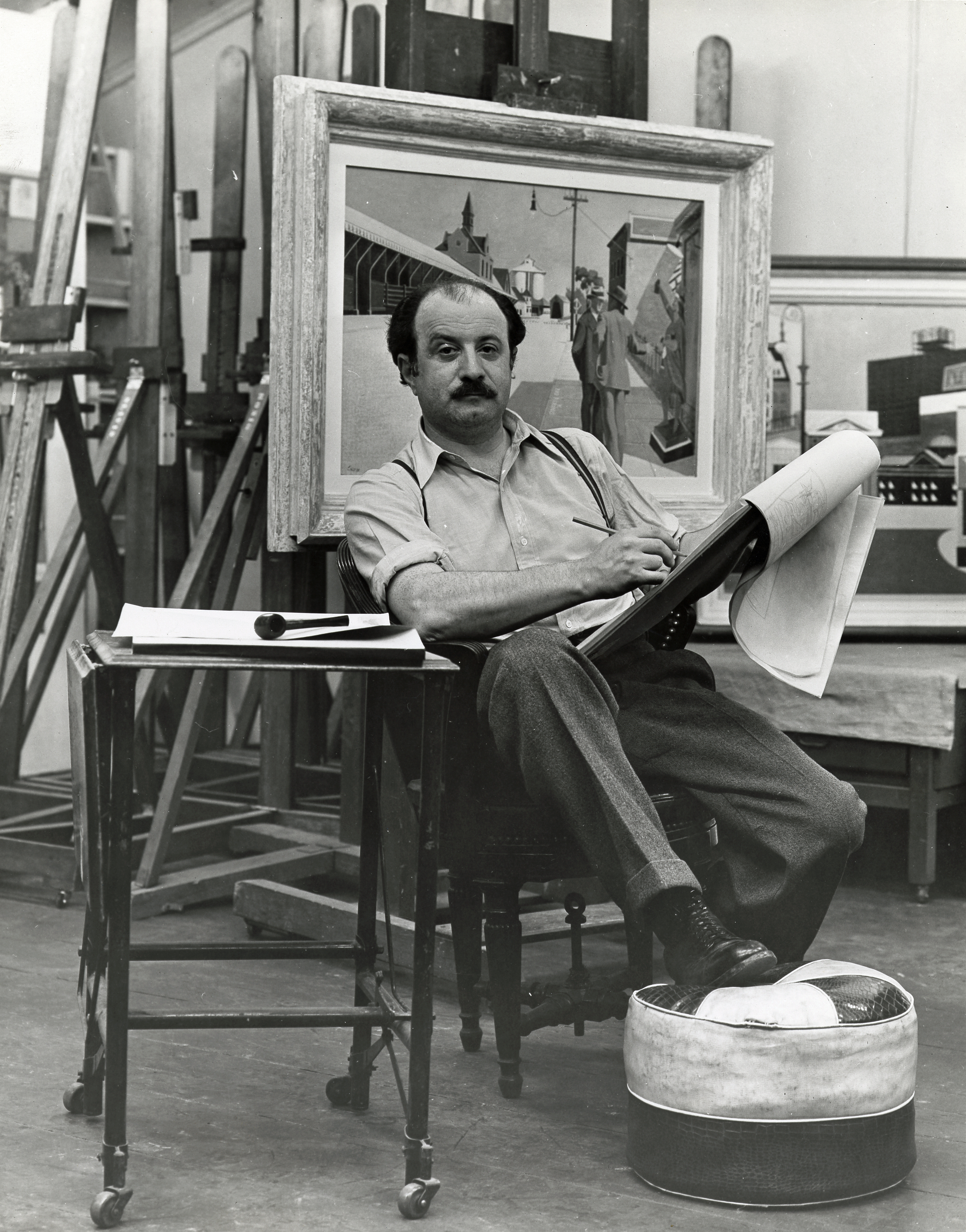
- Criss in his studio in 1940
- Born: Francis Hyman Criss; 1901; London, England
- Died: 1973 (aged 71–72); New York City, US
- Education: Pennsylvania Academy of the Fine Arts, Art Students League of New York, Barnes Foundation
- Known for: Painting
- Movement: Precisionism
- Awards: Guggenheim Fellowship

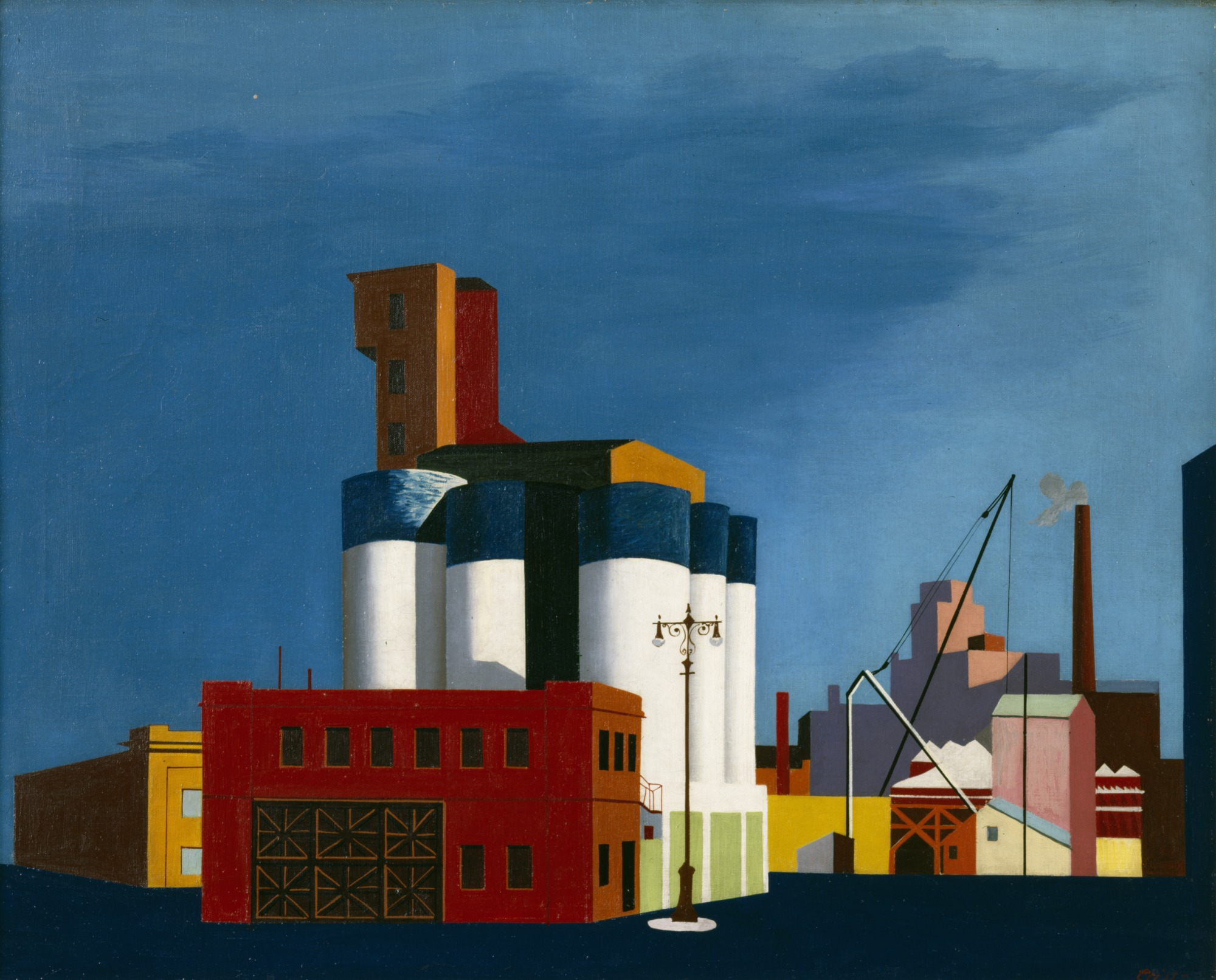
Waterfront 1940, Detroit Institute of Arts

Francis Hyman Criss (1901–1973) was an American painter. Criss's style is associated with the American Precisionists like Charles Demuth and his friend Charles Sheeler.

The work from his best-known years, the 1930s and 1940s, is characterized by imagery of the urban environment, such as elevated subway tracks, skyscrapers, streets, and bridges. Criss rendered these subjects with a streamlined, abstracted style, devoid of human figures, that led him to be associated with the Precisionism movement. With distorted perspectives and dream-like juxtapositions, as in Jefferson Market Courthouse (1935), these empty cityscapes also suggest the influence of Surrealism.

A turn towards more commercial work later in his career—including a November 1942 cover for Fortune Magazine—led to a decline in his reputation. Criss died in 1973 in New York City.

His work is in the collections of the Brooklyn Museum, the Detroit Institute of Arts, the Philadelphia Museum of Art, the Smithsonian American Art Museum, and the Whitney Museum of American Art.

In 2021 Criss' painting Alma Sewing was featured in an essay by the art critic Sebastian Smee in the Washington Post. Smee considers Alma Sewing to be Criss' finest work. The painting in the collection of the High Museum of Art in Atlanta, Georgia.
