= Sanford Ross =

American painter

- Born: Pierre Sanford Ross III; January 25, 1907; Newark, New Jersey
- Died: March 1, 1954 (aged 47); Barnard, Vermont
- Education: Art Students League of New York
- Known for: Painting, lithography
- Movement: Precisionism, Social Realism, Caricature

Sanford Ross (January 25, 1907 – March 1, 1954) was an American realist painter and printmaker. His urban and rural scenes of the 1930s bore the influence of Charles Burchfield and Edward Hopper. His later work focused on the landscape and rural life of Vermont where he lived at the time of his death.

== Biography ==
=== Early life and work ===
Born in Newark, New Jersey, Ross was one of two children of a well-off, upper-class family. His parents were Pierre Sanford Ross Jr., a civil engineer, and his wife Helen Halsey. His grandparents were New York socialites P. Sanford Ross and Kate Ostrom Van Court. He attended the Taft School in Watertown, Connecticut. Demonstrating an early talent in art, he studied at the Art Students League of New York under Thomas Hart Benton in 1928 and under George Luks in 1929. He also studied lithography with Adolf Dehn.

He entered Princeton University in 1930 but chose to leave a year later to pursue a career in art. He held his initial solo exhibitions at the Macbeth Gallery in New York in 1932-1933 to early critical approval of his American scene painting. Subsequently, he showed regularly in New York at Rheinhart and Leeman and at the Van Diemen-Lilienfeld Galleries. His lithographic themes in this period were of rural roads stretching toward distant destinations and sometimes "impish and sardonic" depictions of New Jersey mansions. His caricature of the Long Branch millionaire Solomon Guggenheim's lavish, Moorish-style summer home, Aladdin's Palace, recalled by one historian as "unrivaled for sheer vulgar exhibitionism and bad taste," was featured in the Sunday New York Times in March 1932. Interviewed by Arts Magazine, (then Art Digest) in 1932, he expressed particular preference for Benton, Edward Hopper, Boardman Robinson and in portraiture, Eugene Speicher. In 1933 he was commissioned by Fortune magazine to make watercolor illustrations for an article on the grand homes of Newport Rhode Island and in 1935 for an article on the Saratoga racing scene. He was a WPA artist in Connecticut in 1933. His works of the 1930s show clear influences of Precisionism, Regionalism and the Ashcan School. His work was included in the special 1938 edition of PM magazine that reproduced the best American prints of the previous five years, and in the Whitney Museum Annual Exhibition of Contemporary American Art in 1940.

=== Travel in the 1930s ===
An avid sportsman and photographer who occasionally contributed articles to Country Life, Ross regularly engaged in deep sea fishing. In December 1936 he left the United States to spend three months fishing in New Zealand, then traveled through Asia to present-day Kenya where he hunted big game on safari. Returning in the fall of 1937, he produced a series of watercolors of Africa that subsequently toured the United States as an exhibit under the auspices of the American Federation of Arts.

=== Later life ===
In 1947 he married Rebecca Brock Hughes. Along with her three young daughters of a previous marriage, they moved to a farm he had purchased near Barnard, Vermont. Their son Nicholas was born in 1950. In this rural setting well away from the New York galleries, Ross devoted himself to painting watercolors and oils of Vermont including scenes of ordinary farm work. Dorothy Thompson, who owned a farm adjoining his, was a close friend as were other writers, intellectuals and artists who relocated from New York and war-ravaged Europe to that part of Vermont. Physically unqualified to serve in the military due to a permanent ankle injury, Ross spent the war years in Vermont, occasionally teaching art at nearby Dartmouth College. A senior editor and writer for Life magazine, Noel Busch, observed that his paintings during World War II, which often depicted dark winter or decay, reflected "their seasons in Vermont during a long Winter in the world." His brighter watercolors of the late 1940s were based on popular rural themes but also New York's Central Park in various seasons. Much of his work of this period was reproduced under the auspices of the American Artists Professional League. By 1950 Ross also had become known for his commissioned oil portraits of children whom he often depicted with serious, thoughtful expressions.

He died suddenly of a heart attack in Barnard, Vermont on March 1, 1954. In conjunction with one of his last shows before his death, cultural historian and writer René Fülöp-Miller observed that Ross's "untiring brush manages to depict the very soul of Vermont. This is his originality and makes for the impact of his paintings."

=== Collections ===
In addition to private collections, the art of Sanford Ross appears in the collections of the following: Addison Gallery of American Art, Cornell University, Herbert F. Johnson Museum of Art, Dartmouth College Hood Museum of Art, The Marsh-Billings-Rockefeller Mansion, Woodstock, Vermont, The Newark Museum of Art, New York Academy of Sciences, New York Public Library, Princeton University, Fine Arts Museums of San Francisco, Whitney Museum of American Art, Zimmerli Art Museum at Rutgers University. Ross's prints are included in Fifty Prints of the Year 1934, Fine Prints of the Year 1937, Fine Prints of the Year 1938, Prize Prints of the Twentieth Century, and Eyes on America: The United States as Seen by Her Artists.
