= Joseph Stella =

American painter

- Born: Giuseppe Michele Stella; June 13, 1877; Muro Lucano, Potenza, Basilicata, Kingdom of Italy
- Died: November 5, 1946 (aged 69); New York City, New York, United States
- Education: Art Students League of New York, William Merritt Chase
- Known for: Painting
- Movement: Precisionism, Futurism

Joseph Stella (born Giuseppe Michele Stella, June 13, 1877 – November 5, 1946) was an Italian-born American Futurist painter best known for his depictions of industrial America, especially his images of the Brooklyn Bridge. He is also associated with the American Precisionist movement of the 1910s–1940s.

== Early life and education ==
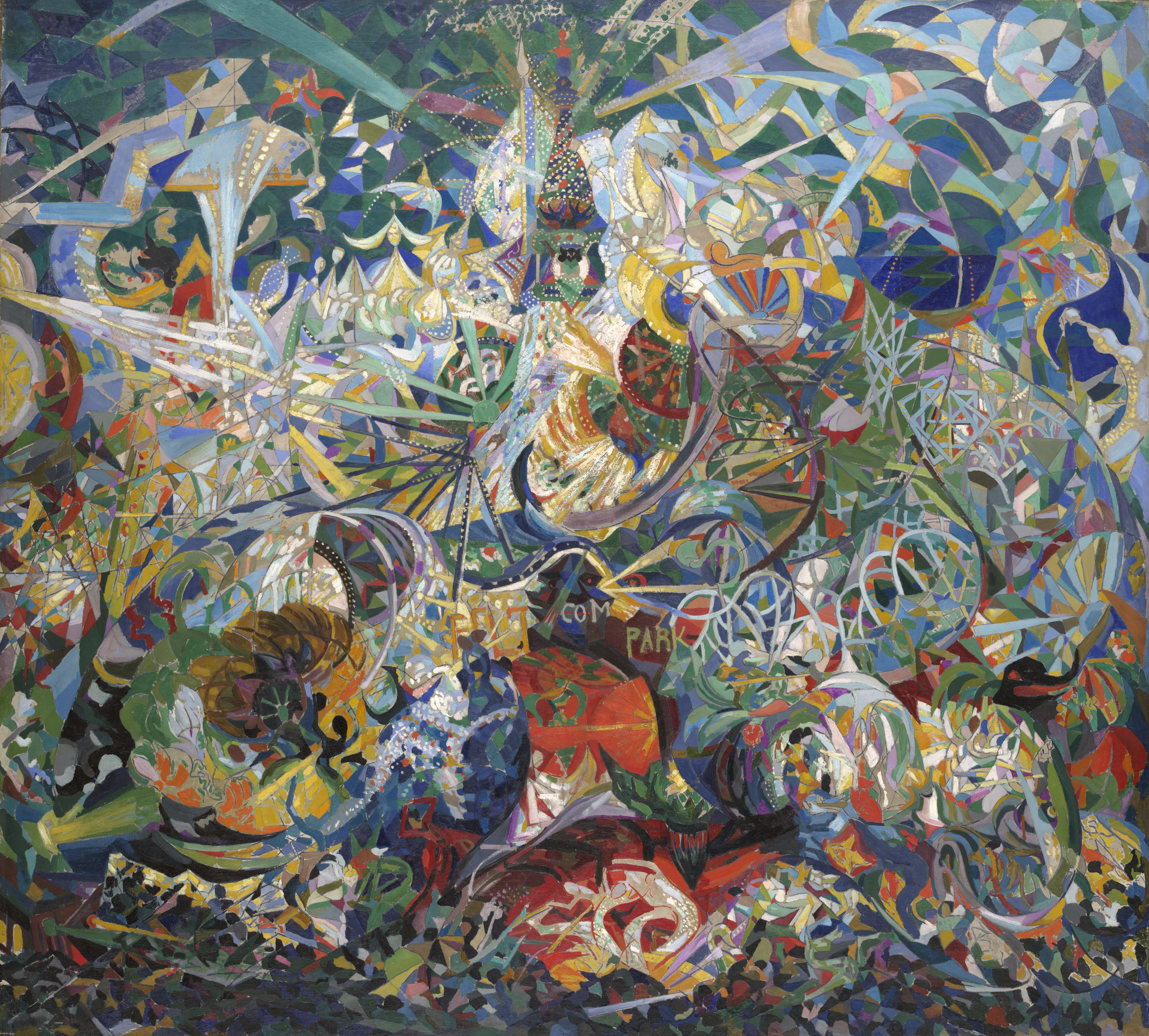
Battle of Lights, Coney Island, Mardi Gras, a 1914 portrait of Coney Island by Stella now on display at Yale University Art Gallery in New Haven, Connecticut

Stella was born to a middle-class family in Italy, in Muro Lucano, a village in the province of Potenza. His grandfather Antonio and his father Michele were attorneys, but he came to New York City in 1896 to study medicine, following in the footsteps of his older brother Doctor Antonio Stella. At that time, Giuseppe changed his name to Joseph. However, he quickly abandoned his medical studies and turned instead to art, studying at the Art Students League and the New York School of Art under William Merritt Chase.

== Career ==
=== United States ===
Three Heads, a 1920 portrait bust by Stella and Marcel Duchamp depicting Man Ray and Marcel Duchamp now on display at the Museum of Modern Art in New York City

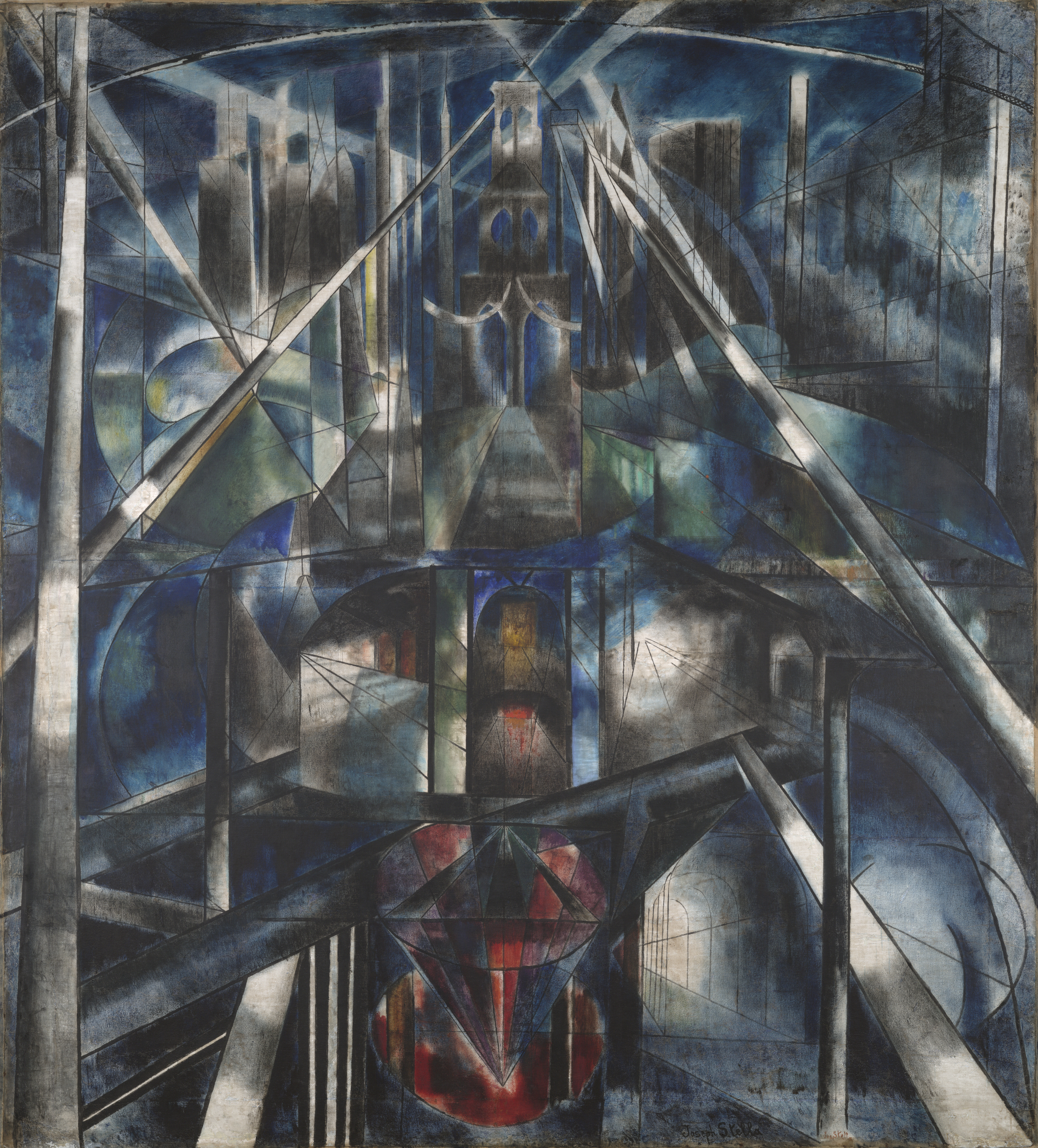
Brooklyn Bridge, a 1920 portrait of the Brooklyn Bridge by Stella now on display at Yale University Art Gallery in New Haven, Connecticut

Stella's first paintings were Rembrandtesque depictions of city slum life. A remarkable draftsman, he made drawings throughout the various phases of his career, beginning as an academic realist with a particular interest in immigrant and ethnic life. From 1905 to 1909, he worked as an illustrator, publishing his realist drawings in magazines. "He prowled the streets, sketchpad and pencil in hand, alert to catch the pose of the moment, the detail of costume or manner that told the story of a life." In 1908, he was commissioned for a series on industrial Pittsburgh, later published in The Pittsburgh Survey.

=== Europe ===
Stella returned to Italy in 1909. He was unhappy in the United States, writing that he longed to be back in his native land after "an enforced stay among enemies, in a black funereal land over which weighed ... the curse of a merciless climate." His return to Europe led to his first extensive contact with Modernism, which would ultimately mold his distinctive personal style, notable for its strong color and sweeping and dynamic lines. By 1911, he had departed Italy, where the omnipresence of the Renaissance presented its own kind of obstacle for contemporary painters, and relocated to Paris. When he arrived, "Fauvism, Cubism, and Futurism were in full swing," he wrote, and "[there] was in the air the glamor of a battle." It was the right place to be, at just the right time, for a man of Stella's curiosity, openness to new trends, and ambition.

In Paris, Stella attended the salon of Gertrude Stein, where he met many other painters. "[Stein] found the big and boisterous painter rather like [her friend, the poet] Apollinaire; they both had a fund of sarcastic wit that was frequently turned on their hosts." Stella's view of his hostess was indeed sarcastic: she sat, he wrote, "enthroned on a sofa in the middle of the room," surrounded by her Cézannes and Picassos, "with the forceful solemnity of a pythoness or a sibyl ... in a high and distant pose."

Having met Umberto Boccioni and befriended Gino Severini in Europe, he became associated with the Italian Futurists and began to incorporate Futurist principles into his art, though he was also interested in the structural experiments of the Cubists and the dynamic color of the Fauves.

=== Return to United States ===
Returning to New York City in 1913, Stella wanted to give the United States a second try. It was a decision he did not regret, although, as art historian Wanda Corn noted, "his culture shock never abated." He became a part of the Alfred Stieglitz and the Walter Arensberg circles in Manhattan and enjoyed close relationships with fellow expatriates Albert Gleizes and leader of the New York Dada movement Marcel Duchamp (Stella and Arensberg accompanied Duchamp to the plumbing supply store in 1917 to purchase the infamous urinal.). As a result of these associations, he had almost as many opportunities as he had known in Europe to be among kindred spirits and to see advanced new art. In 1913–14, he painted Battle of Lights, Coney Island, one of the earliest and greatest American Futurist works. The legendary Armory Show of 1913, in which he participated, provided him with greater impetus to experiment with modernist styles. Der Rosenkavalier (1914) and Spring (The Procession – A Chromatic Sensation) (1914–16) are vigorous color abstractions.

Following the Armory Show, Stella also became a much-talked-about figure in the New York City art world, an object of virulent attacks from conservative critics who found Modernism threatening and inexplicable and an object of fascination to younger, more adventurous artists. In the view of art historian Sam Hunter, "Among the modern paintings at the Armory Show, Duchamp's Nude Descending a Staircase, Picabia's Procession at Seville, and Stella's Futurist Battle of Lights, Coney Island came to exert the most seminal influence on American painters." A friend noted that the painting "caused a general sensation, an artistic upheaval as sudden and unexpected as it was universal [in avant-garde circles]." Collector and art educator Katherine Dreier included Stella among those artists whose work she sought to promote under the auspices of her Societe Anonyme, New York's first museum dedicated exclusively to advanced contemporary art, which opened its doors in 1920.

In New York City during the 1920s, Stella became fascinated with the geometric quality of the architecture of Lower Manhattan. In these works he further assimilated elements of Cubism and Futurism. In Brooklyn Bridge (1919–20), he shows his fascination with the sweeping lines of the Roeblings' bridge, a motif he used several years before poet Hart Crane turned to this structure as a symbol of modernity. Stella's depictions of the bridge feature the diagonal cables that sweep downward forcefully, providing directional energy. While these dynamic renderings suggest the excitement and motion of modern life, in Stella's hands, the image of the bridge also becomes a powerful icon of stability and solidarity. Among his other well-known paintings is New York Interpreted (The Voice of the City) (1922), a five-paneled work (almost twenty-three feet long and over eight feet high) patterned after a religious altarpiece, but depicting bridges and skyscrapers instead of saints. This work reflects the belief, common at the time, that industry was displacing religion as the center of modern life. The painting is in the collection of the Newark Museum in Newark, New Jersey. "At a time when virtually all modernists tried their hand at representing the city," Wanda Corn wrote, "Stella's painting is the summa."

In the 1930s, Stella worked on the Federal Art Project and later traveled to Europe, North Africa, and the West Indies, locations that inspired him to work in various modes. He restlessly moved from one style to the next, from realism to abstraction to surrealism. He executed abstract city themes, religious images, botanical and nature studies, erotic and steamy Caribbean landscapes, and colorful still lifes of vegetables, fruits, and flowers.

Stella's works from his post-Armory Show period, however, were problematic for the cultivation of a sustained career. Once he had ceased painting in a Futurist or quasi-Cubist mode and had finished with his period of Precisionist factory images (circa 1920), he was not aligned with any particular movement. His concerns, as well as his approach to painting, became less timely, more personal and idiosyncratic. Tree of My Life (1919), like many later Stella works, is "baroque and operatic," a garden scene out of Bosch, and his figure studies (usually female, often Madonna-like) are decoratively, extravagantly embellished. His numerous floral works border on the surreal but, in their lushness and excess, could not accurately be characterized as a part of the Surrealist movement. Critic Lewis Mumford called him a "puzzling painter" at that point, commenting, "I have seen the fissure between his realism and his fantasy widen into an abyss."

Stella's draftsmanship influenced the many different kinds of images he created throughout his life. He is especially noted today for his portraits on paper drawn in silverpoint, or silverpoint and oil, most from the 1920s. His renderings of Walt Whitman, Marcel Duchamp, the artist Louis Eilshemius, and his friend, the composer Edgar Varese, are works known for their sensitivity to line, facial detail, and the intellectual aura of the sitter.

A lesser-known aspect of Stella's work is the collages he made in the 1920s, consisting of scraps of discarded paper, wrappers (some with the commercial logo or label still visible), and other bits of urban debris, often slashed with brush strokes of paint. Though Stella was "attracted to the grandiose, mechanized aspects of the city, [he] was also drawn to its anonymous, unnoticed discards...the detritus of human existence." These are works in the spirit of the German collage artist Kurt Schwitters and the anti-"high art" ethos of the Dada movement, which always interested Stella.

By the late 1930s, Stella's work attracted considerably less attention than it had in previous decades. His truculent personality had alienated many old friends, and his style no longer spoke to the times. "Stella's health and critical fortunes sank in [the years prior to World War II]. Emotionally cut off from the New York art world, even his retrospective at the Newark Museum in 1939 failed to reestablish him. Though successful as a presentation, the show was less enthusiastically reviewed than Stella had anticipated, and he later complained of not being able to induce anyone living in New York City to see it."

== Death ==
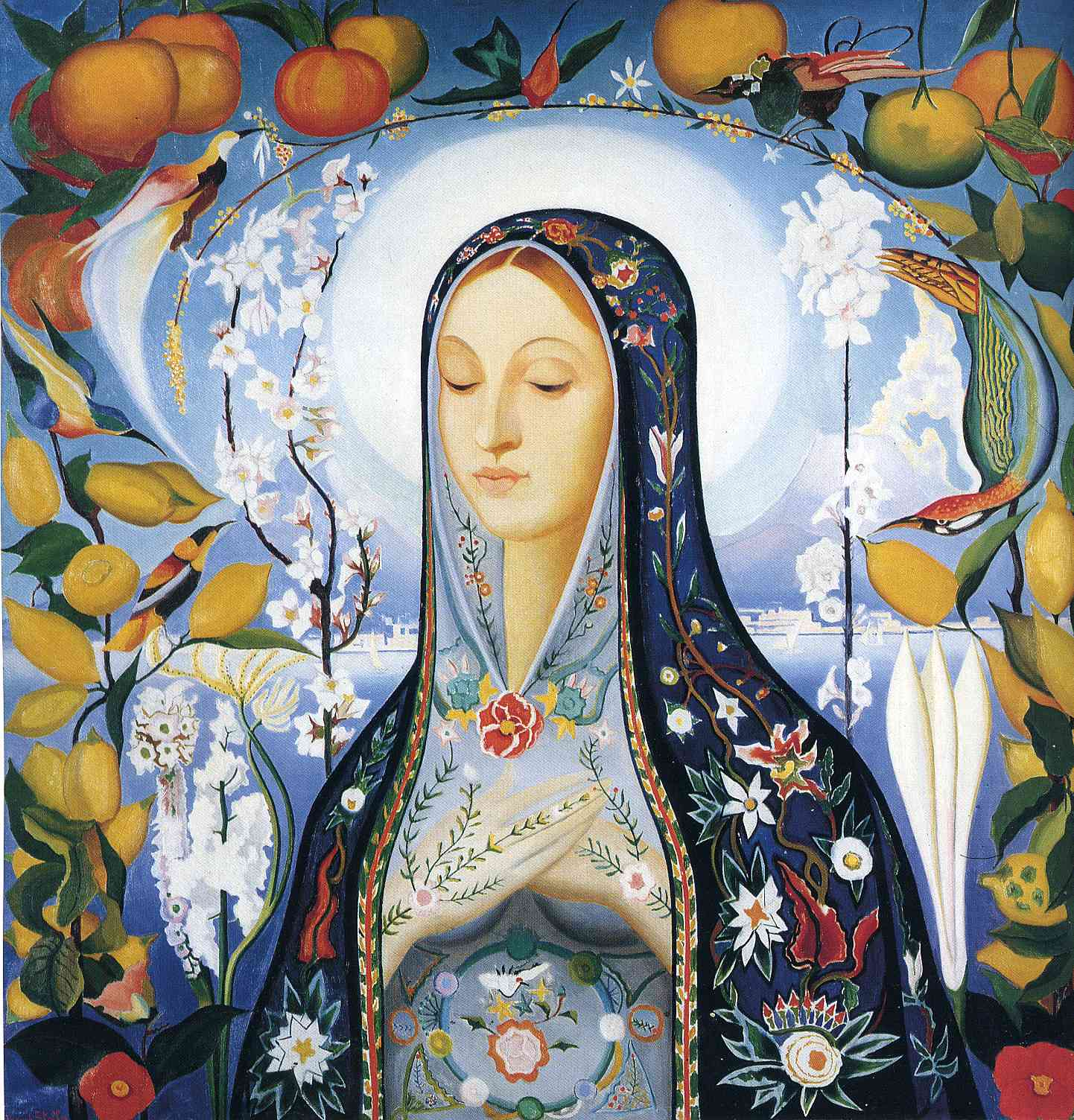
The Virgin

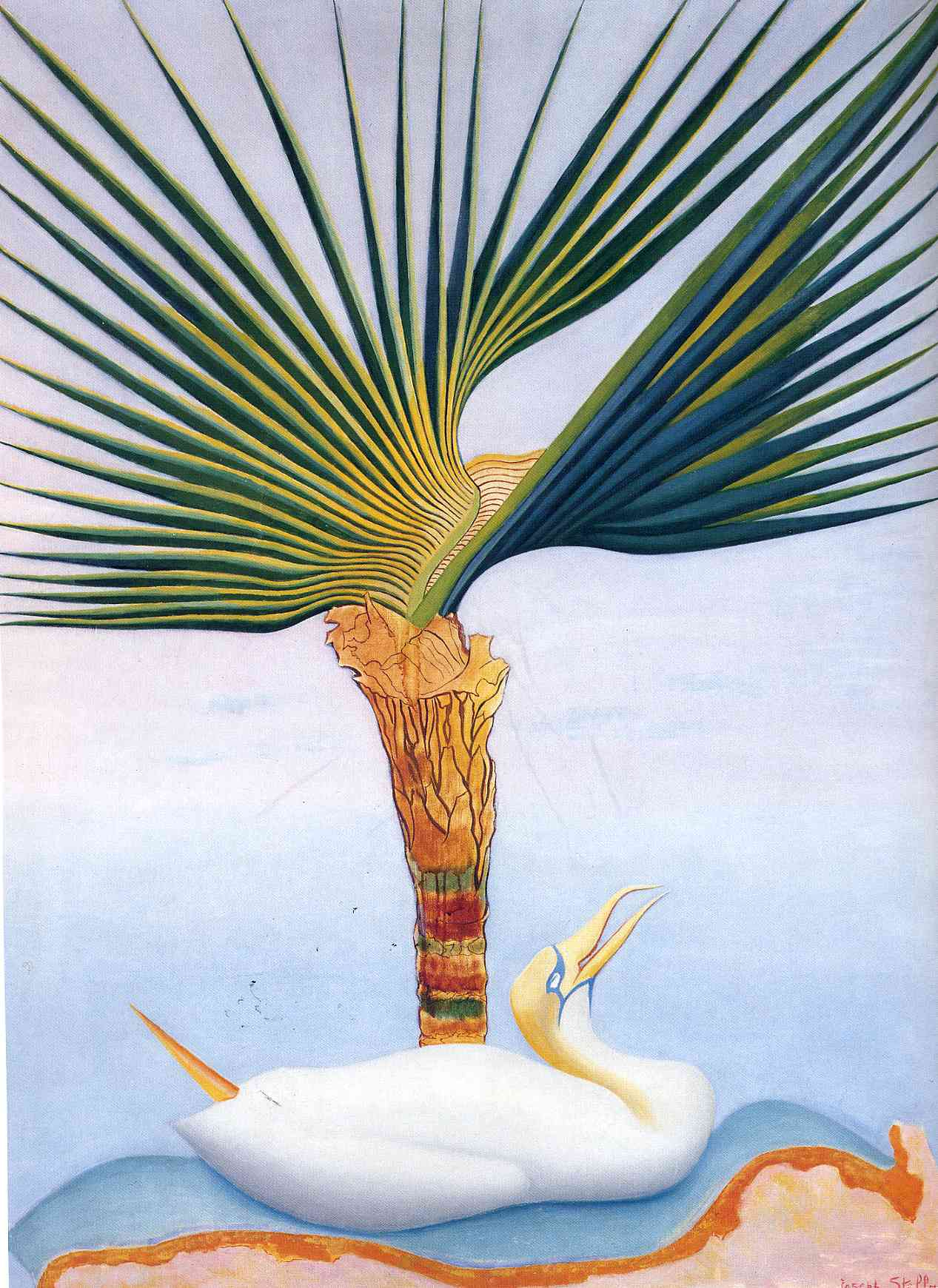
Palm tree and bird

Stella was diagnosed with cardiovascular disease in the early 1940s and became subject to increasing periods of morbid anxiety. On November 5, 1946, he died of heart failure at age 69. He is interred in a mausoleum at Woodlawn Cemetery in The Bronx, New York City.

== Major works in public collections ==
- Pittsburgh Factory Scene (1908–1918): Minneapolis Institute of Art, Minneapolis
- Battle of Lights, Coney Island, Mardi Gras (1913–14): Yale University Art Gallery
- Battle of Lights, Coney Island (1913–14): Sheldon Museum of Art, University of Nebraska–Lincoln
- Der Rosenkavalier (1914): Whitney Museum of American Art
- Pyrotechnic Fires (1919): Museum of Fine Arts Houston
- Brooklyn Bridge (1919–20): Yale University Art Gallery
- New York Interpreted (The Voice of the City) (1920–22): Newark Museum
- Factories (1920): Museum of Modern Art
- The Birth of Venus (1922): Salisbury House
- By-Product Plants (1923–26): Chicago Art Institute
- The Amazon (1925–26): Baltimore Museum of Art
- The Virgin (1926): Brooklyn Museum
- Tree, Cactus, Moon (1927–28): Reynolda House Museum, North Carolina
- American Landscape (1929): Walker Art Center
- Lotus (1929): Hirshhorn Museum
- Flowers, Italy (1930): Phoenix Art Museum
- Smoke Stacks (1935): Indiana State University Art Collection
- Bridge (1936): San Francisco Museum of Modern Art, San Francisco
- Old Brooklyn Bridge (1941): Museum of Fine Arts, Boston

== Select list of Collections ==
- Amon Carter Museum of American Art
- Brooklyn Museum of Art
- Metropolitan Museum of Art
- Museum of Modern Art
- National Gallery of Art
- The Phillips Collection
- Whitney Museum of American Art

== Select list of Exhibitions ==
- The Drawings of Joseph Stella. Museum of Modern Art, October 26 – November 13, 1960.
- Joseph Stella: Visionary Nature. Co-organized by the Brandywine Museum of Art and the High Museum of Art. Exhibition explored his nature-inspired work, including flowers, trees, and birds, showcasing his shift from industrial subjects to spiritual themes; displayed at the High Museum of Art (February 24 – May 21, 2023), Brandywine Museum of Art (June 17, 2023 – September 24, 2023) and Norton Museum of Art (October 15, 2022 – January 15, 2023); catalog edited by Stephanie Mayer Heydt, Audrey Lewis, Thomas Padon (ISBN 978-1-636-81092-8)
- Lyrical Spirit: The Natural World of Joseph Stella. Avery Galleries, Bryn Mawr, Pennsylvania (8 June – 31 August 2023).
- Joseph Stella: Unsealed from Paradise. Schoelkopf Gallery (October 13 – December 1, 2023). Exhibition focused on his works from 1914–1944, highlighting his unique techniques like silverpoint and his interest in organic forms.

== Art market ==
On 13 November 2018 a painting by Stella titled Tree of My Life (1919) sold at Christie's New York for US$5,937,500; a world record for a work by Stella at public auction.

== Selected works ==
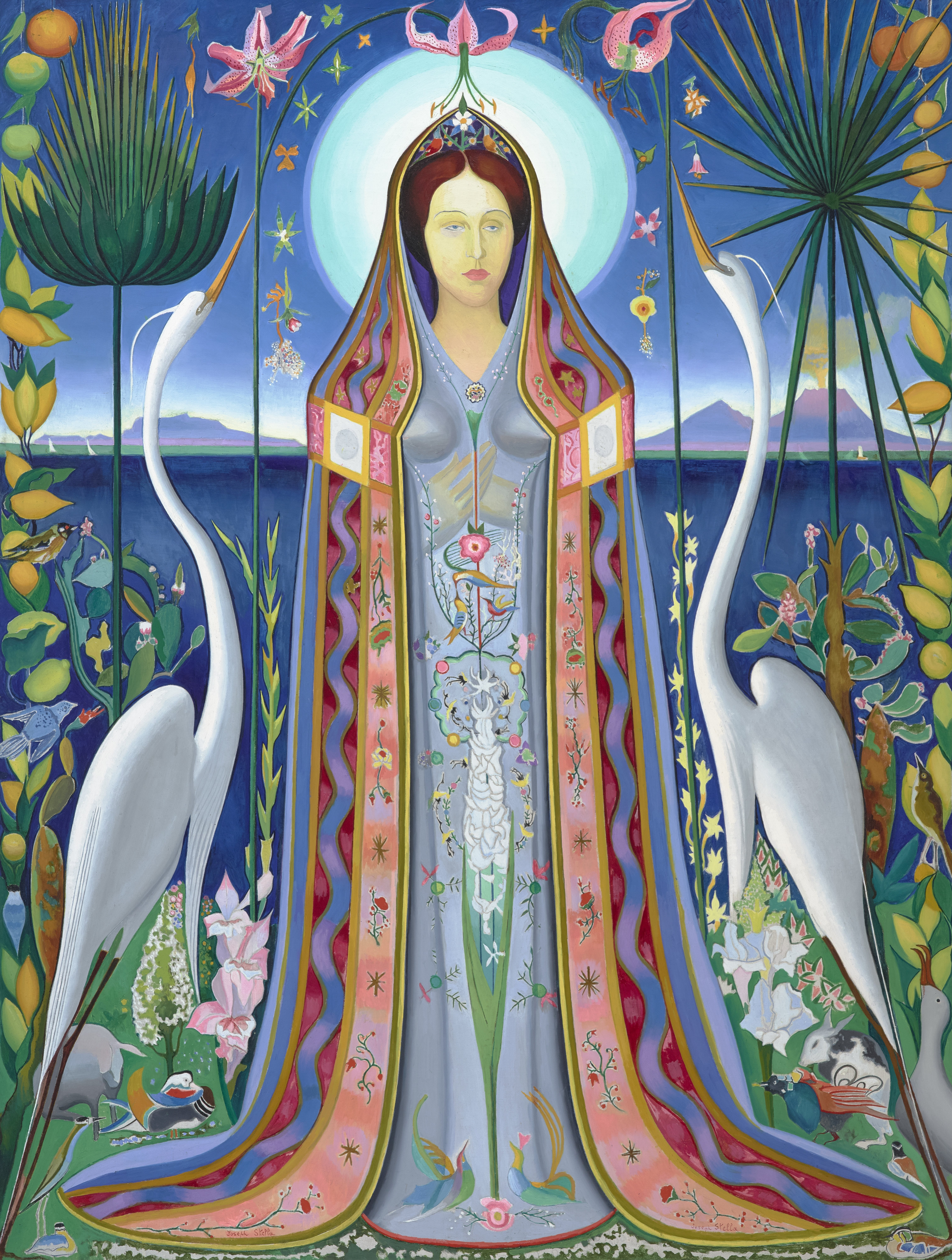
Purissima (Purest),1927

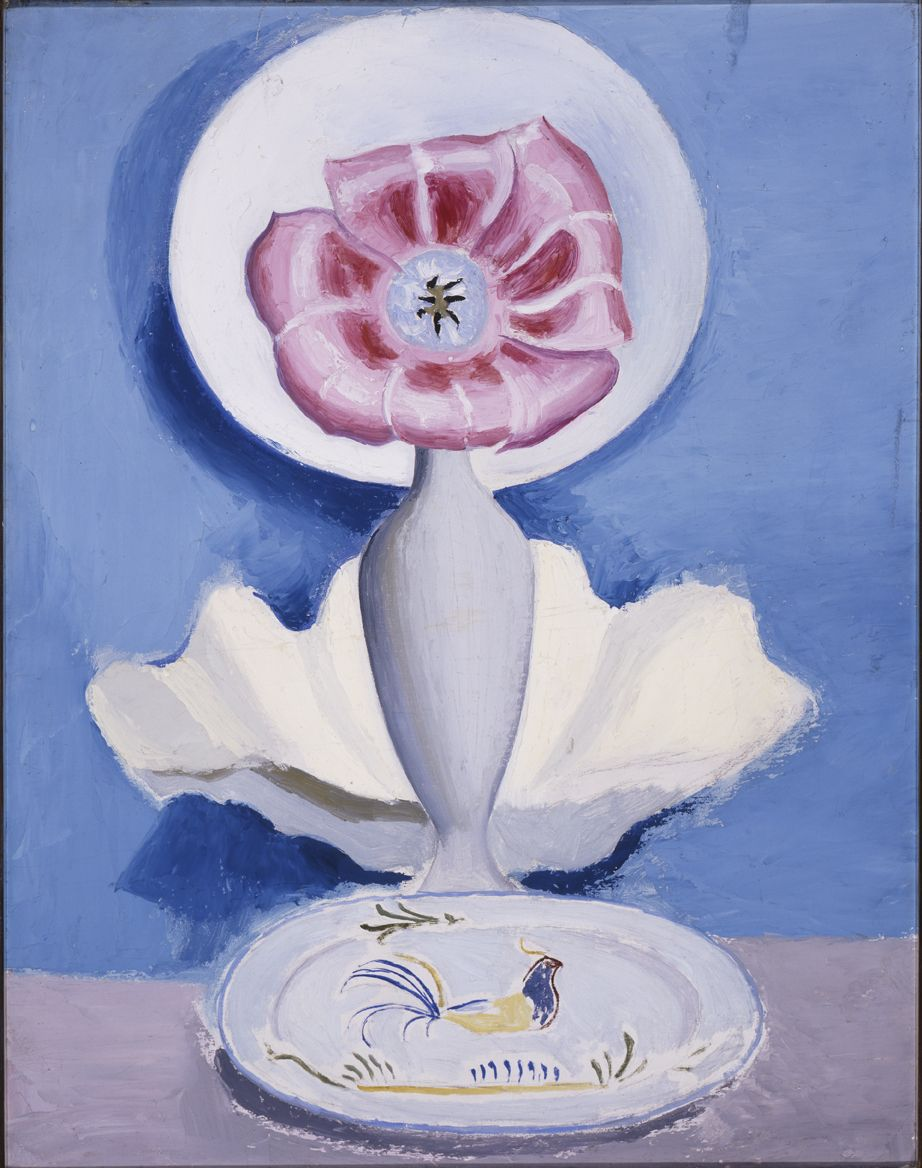
Hibiscus, Shell, and Plate

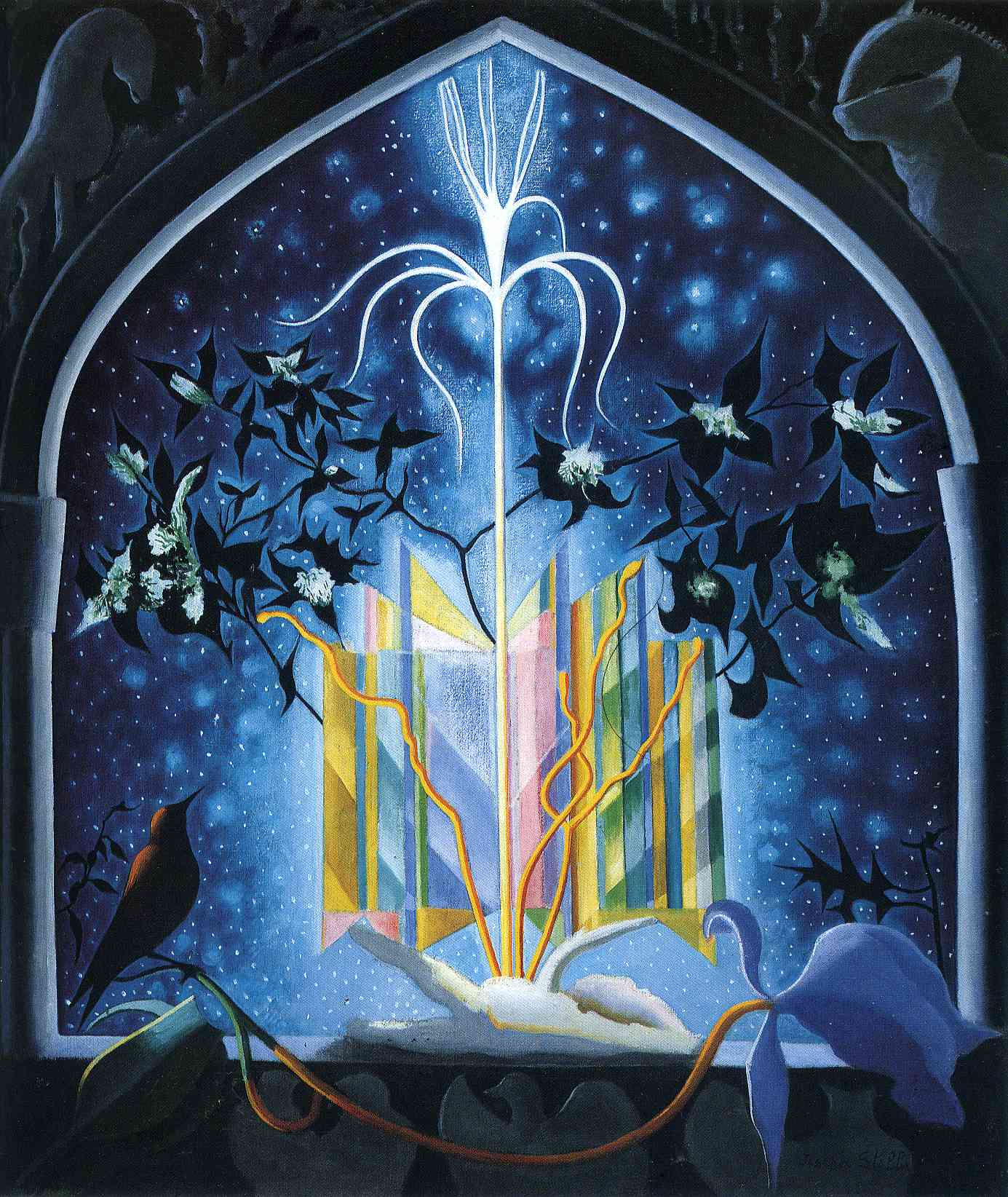
Serenade a Christmas fantasy

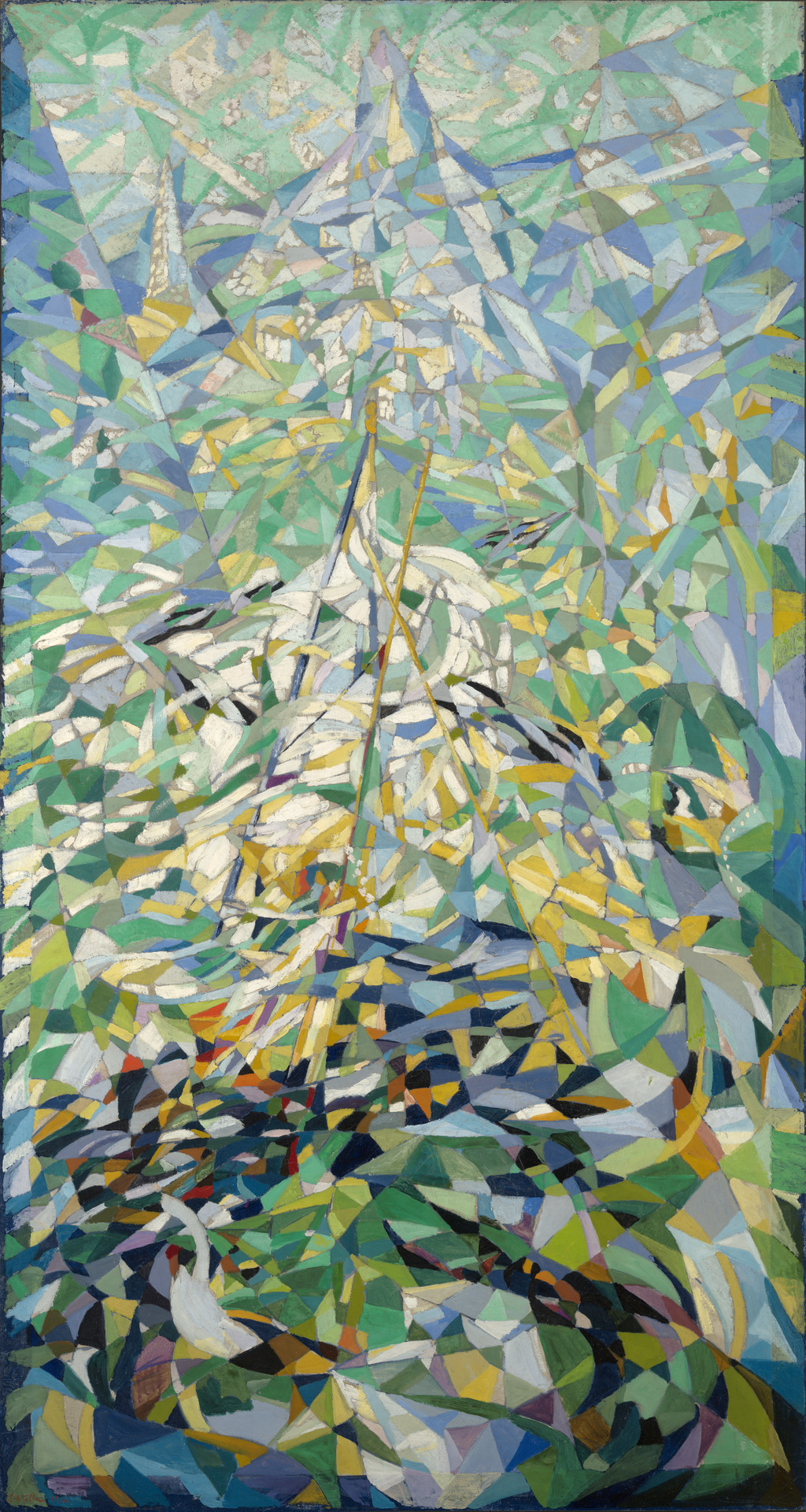
Spring (The Procession)

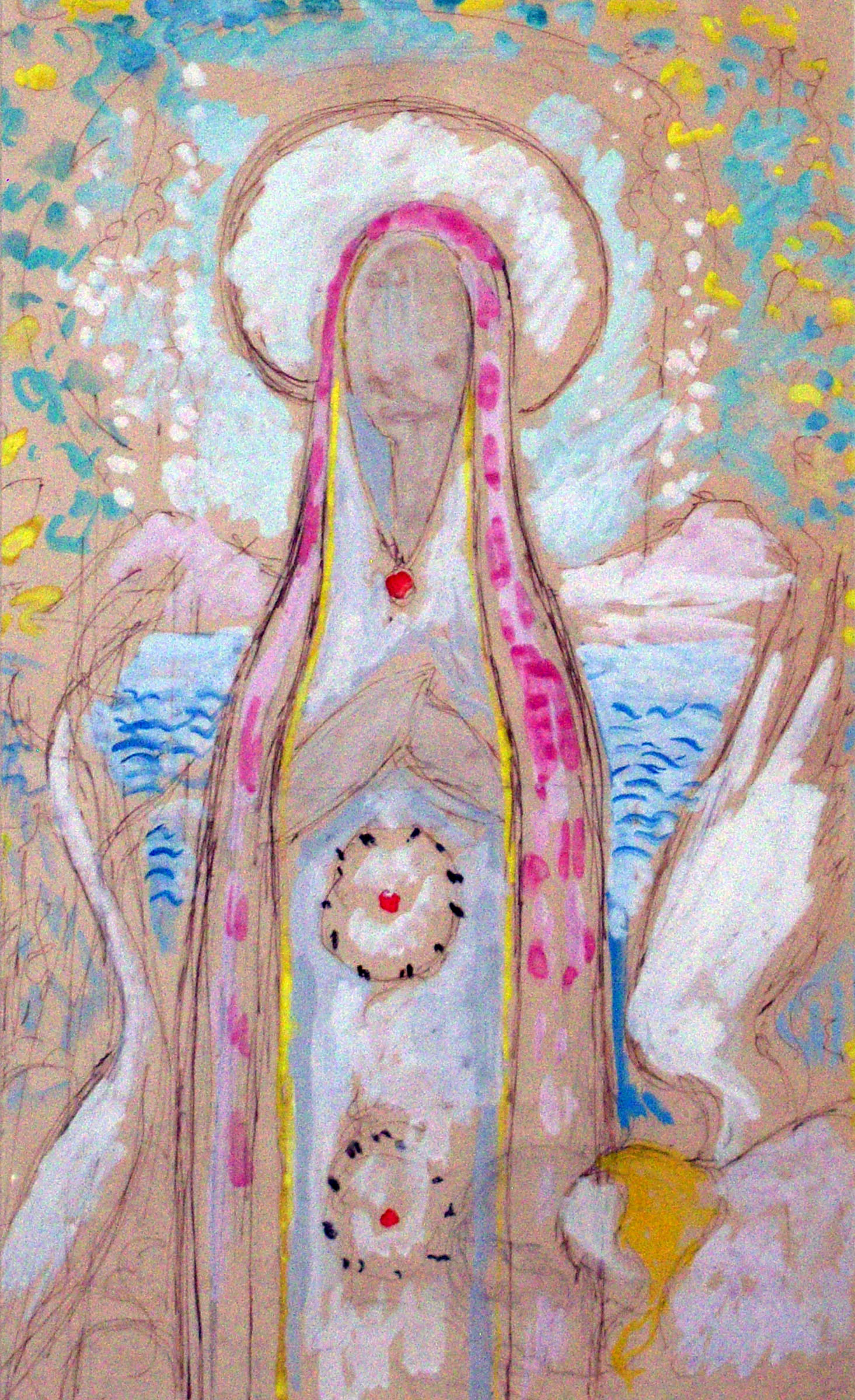
Madonna

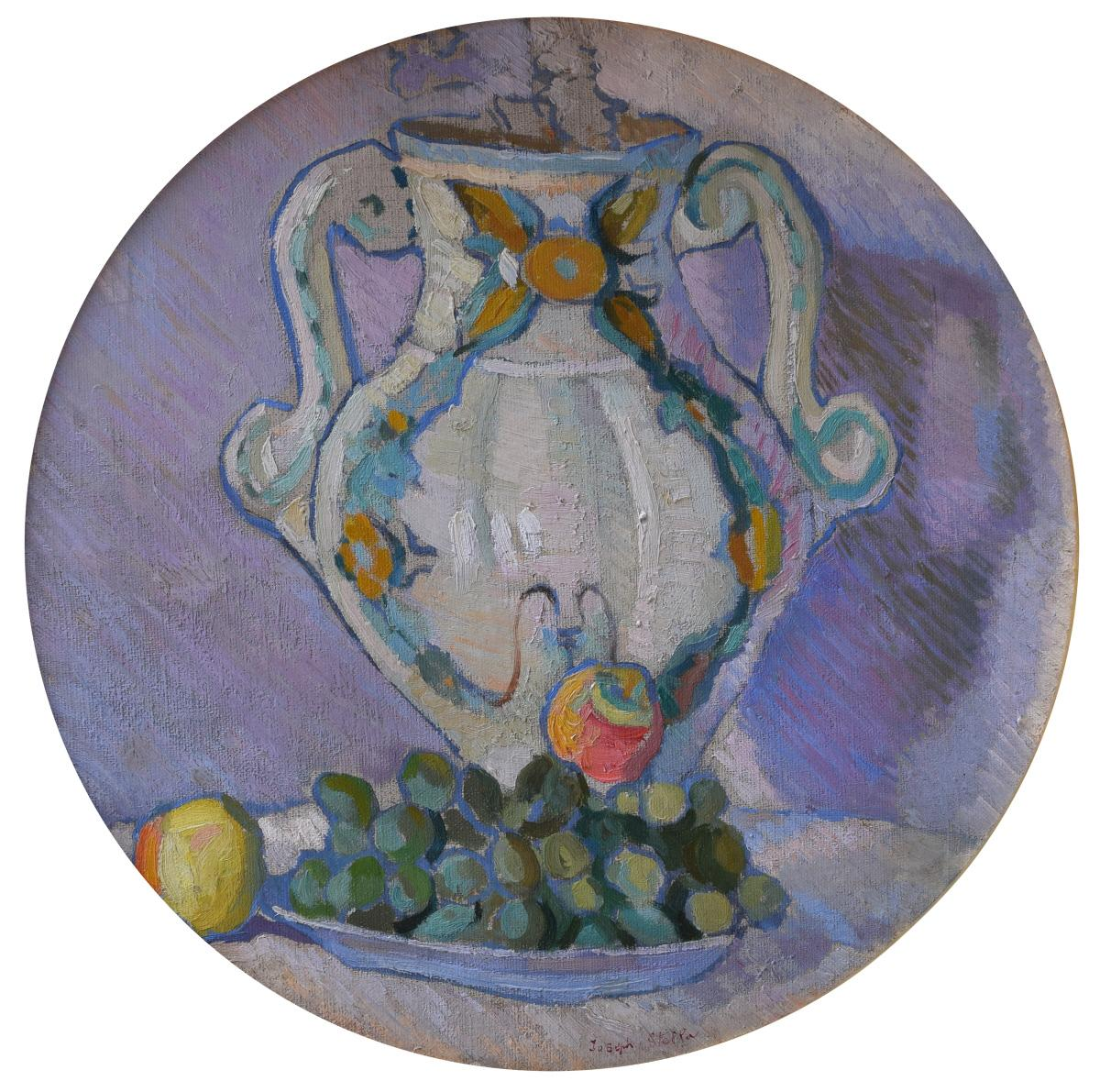
Still Life

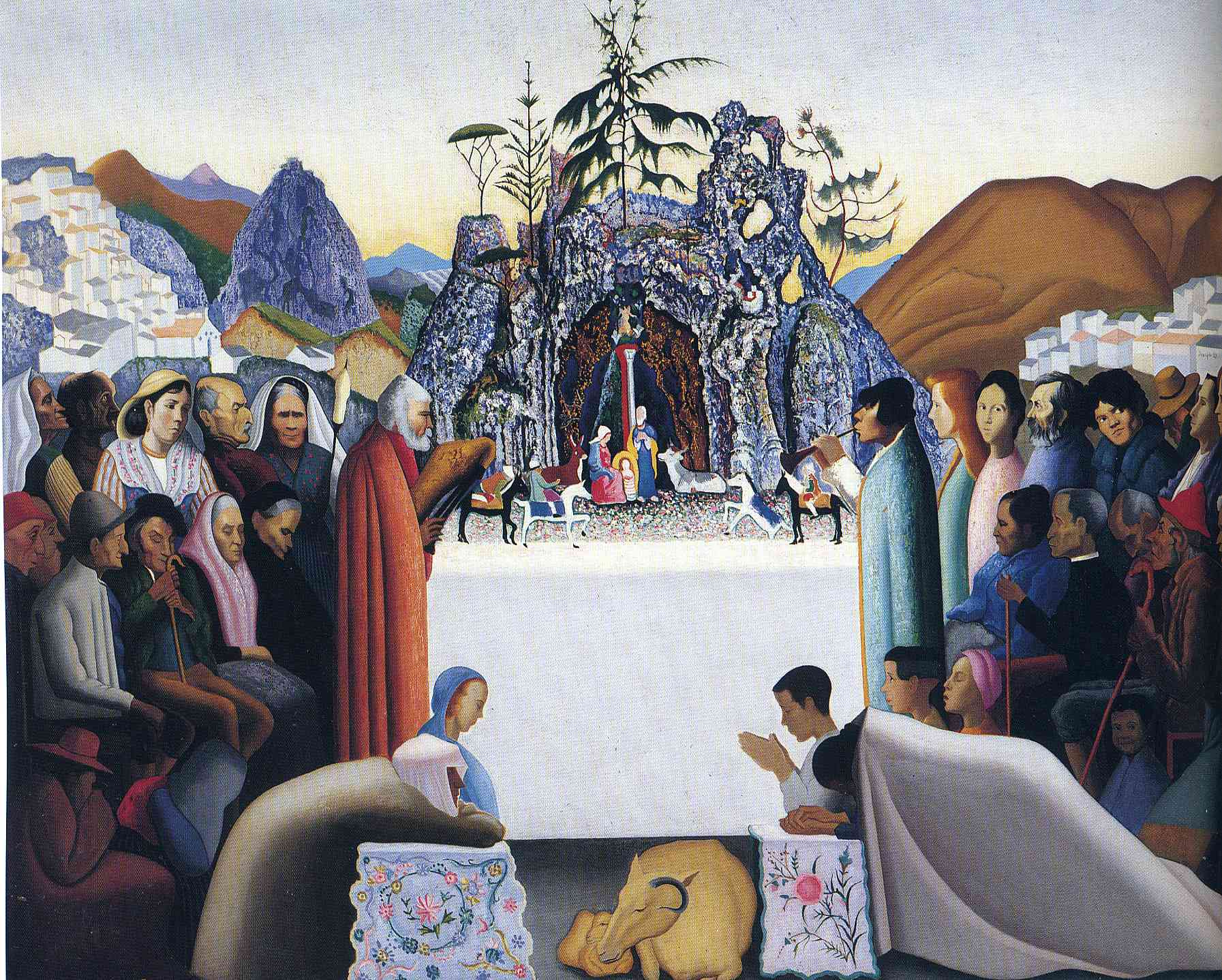
Men and women around the world united around Jesus

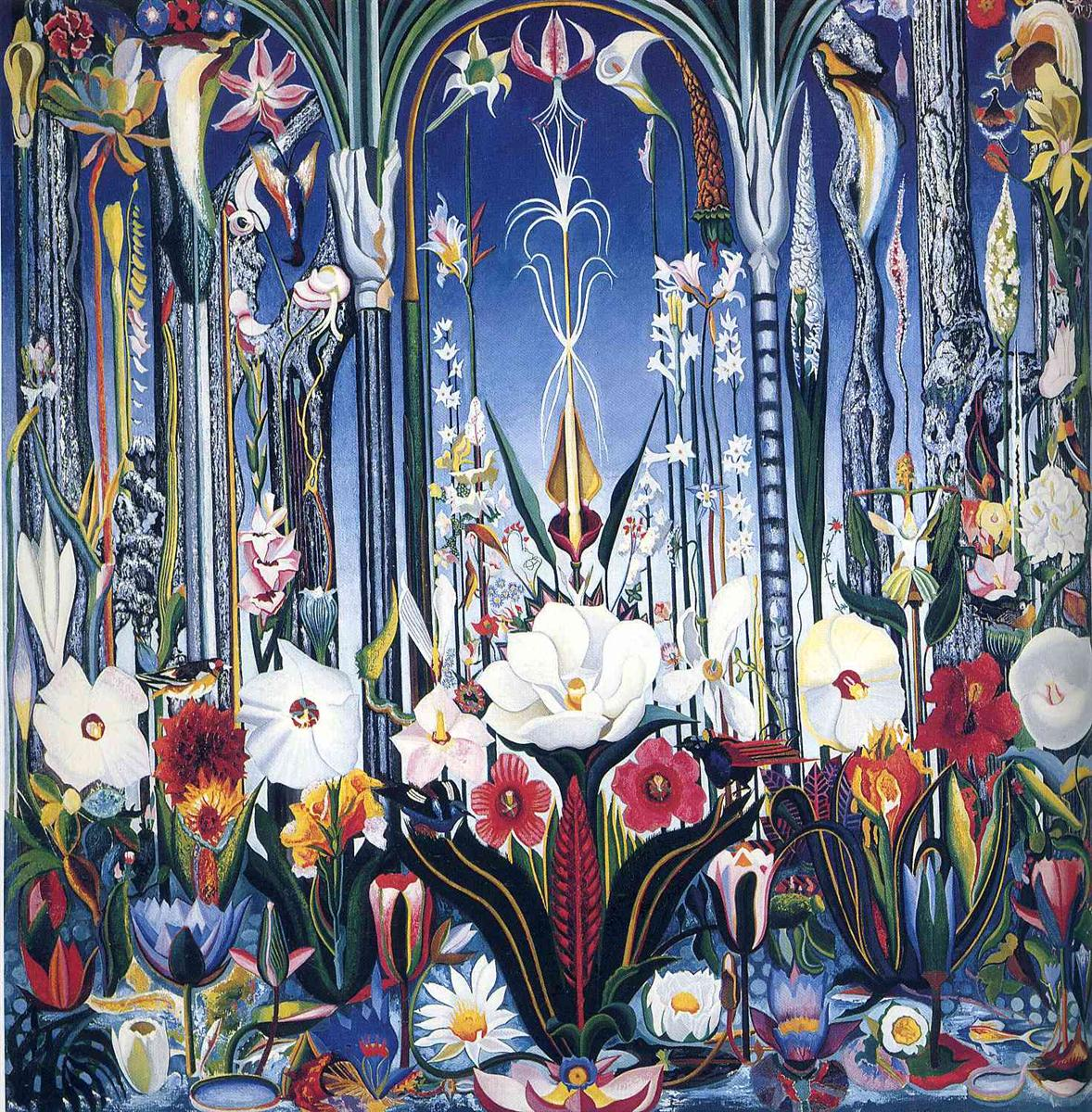
Flowers, Italy

== Sources ==
- Sullivan Goss, Joseph Stella
- Brown, Milton. American Painting from the Armory Show to the Depression. Princeton: Princeton University Press, 1955.
- Corn, Wanda. "An Italian in New York" (pp. 135–190) in Corn, The Great American Thing: Modern Art and National Identity, 1915–1935. Berkeley: University of California Press, 1999.
- Davidson, Abraham A. Early American Modernist Painting, 1910–1935. New York: DaCapo, 1994 edition.
- Haskell, Barbara. Joseph Stella. New York: Whitney Museum of American Art (exhibition catalogue), 1994.
- Hughes, Robert. American Visions: The Epic History of Art in America. New York: Knopf, 1997.
- Hunter, Sam. Modern American Painting and Sculpture. New York: Dell, 1959.
- Jaffe, Irma. Joseph Stella. New York: Fordham University Press, 1988 edition.
- Salvatore Pagliuca "Antonio Stella, medico e filantropo, a New York", Basilicata Regione
