= Preston Dickinson =

American artist

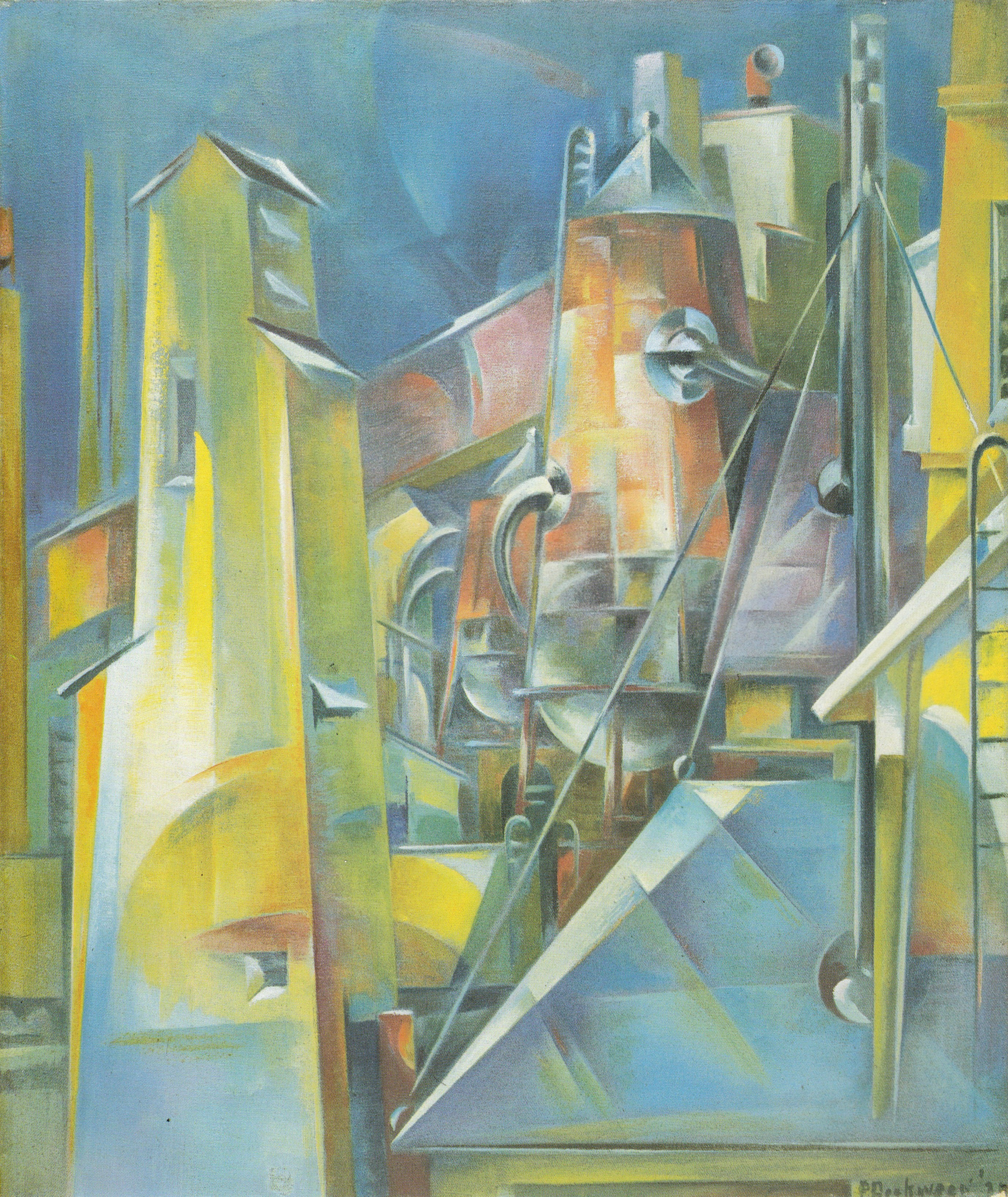
Factory (c. 1920). Oil on canvas, Columbus Museum of Art.

William Preston Dickinson (September 9, 1889 – November 25, 1930) was an American modern artist, best known for his paintings of industrial subjects in the Precisionist style.

== Biography ==
William Preston Dickinson was born on September 9, 1889, in New York City, a third-generation American in a working-class family. His father was an amateur painter who made a living as a calligrapher and interior decorator; he died when Preston was only eleven years old. By 1906, his family had relocated to Suffern, New York.

Dickinson studied between 1906 and 1910 at the Art Students League of New York under William Merritt Chase, as well as under Ernest Lawson. His tuition at the art school was paid by philanthropist and art patron Henry Barbey. Barbey and art dealer Charles Daniel also financed Dickinson's trip to Europe. From 1910 to 1914, he lived in Paris, where he studied at the Académie Julian and École des Beaux-Arts, and exhibited his work at the Paris Salon and the Salon des Indépendants.

After the start of World War I, Dickinson returned to the U.S. in September 1914. Lacking resources, he moved in with his mother, widowed sister and her son in the Bronx. He shortly participated in several group exhibitions at the Daniel Gallery, ultimately receiving his first solo gallery show there in 1923. He spent the summer of 1924 in Omaha, Nebraska, where he produced a series of drawings of the Peters Mills granaries and factory complex. He lived in Quebec from 1925 to 1926, where he painted landscapes and street scenes. By the end of the 1920s, he had established a reputation as an important American modernist and his works had entered public and private collections.

In June 1930, Dickinson moved to Spain with friend and fellow painter Oronzo Gasparo, looking for a cheap place to live and paint. Dickinson's money ran out by that autumn, but before he could leave Spain he was hospitalized with double pneumonia. He died three days later, on November 25, 1930, in Irun, Spain, and was buried there. He had long been in poor health, suffering from alcoholism among other conditions.

Dickinson posthumously received his first solo museum show, staged at The Phillips Collection in 1931 by its founder and director Duncan Phillips, who had admired Dickinson's work.

== Work ==
Dickinson was one of the first American artists to focus on industrial subjects. He was working in the Precisionist mode by at least 1915, and his depictions of factories and granaries predate those of fellow Precisionists Charles Sheeler and Charles Demuth. Dickinson was motivated by a reverence for the benefits of technology and industry to humanity, as well as an interest in its formal qualities. Many of his industrial scenes were imaginary (such as Factory (c. 1920), pictured at right), though his work later shifted towards a greater realism. Dickinson also produced many landscapes, depicting the Harlem River at many times during his life, though he was most interested in the cut-stone architecture that lined and crossed the river. He painted numerous still lifes of man-made objects, with table-top settings depicting "simple dining" being a recurring theme.

Experimenting with a variety of techniques and styles, his work showed influence from a number of avant-garde art movements, such as Cubism, Futurism, Fauvism, and Synchromism. His use of color was expressive, showing his influence by the Post-Impressionists and Fauves. His later work, though superficially in a Precisionist style, utilizes off-balance, expressionistic compositions with jagged diagonals. Some of his work in the 1920s was also observed by critics as having an Oriental influence, believed to derive from his studies of Japanese ukiyo-e art.

Dickinson produced fewer than two hundred works during his twenty-year career. He usually did not sign or date his works, which together with his stylistic experimentation makes it difficult to place them in a chronology.
