= Ralston Crawford =

American painter, lithographer, photographer (1906–1978)

- Maitland Bridge #2, 1938, Museum of Fine Arts, Boston
- Born: September 5, 1906; St. Catharines, Ontario, Canada
- Died: April 27, 1978 (aged 71); Houston, Texas, United States
- Burial place: St. Louis Cemetery No. 3, New Orleans, Louisiana, United States
- Education: Otis Art Institute, Pennsylvania Academy of the Fine Arts, Barnes Foundation, Académie Colarossi, Académie Scandinave
- Known for: Painting, photography
- Spouse: Peggy Frank (m. ?–1978; his death)
- Children: 3

Ralston Crawford, Lights in an Aircraft Plant, 1945, oil on canvas, National Gallery of Art (Washington, D.C.)

Ralston Crawford (1906–1978) was a Canadian-born American painter, lithographer, photographer, and teacher. He is best known for his abstract representations of urban life and industry. He taught at the Cincinnati Art Academy (now Art Academy of Cincinnati) for many years.

== Early life ==
He was born on September 5, 1906, in St. Catharines, Ontario, and spent his childhood in Buffalo, New York.

He studied art beginning in 1927 in California at the Otis Art Institute. After working at the Walt Disney Studio in Hollywood, California, he relocated to further study art at the Pennsylvania Academy of the Fine Arts, and at the Barnes Foundation in Philadelphia. It was there he was exposed to the work of Picasso and Matisse. After traveling to Paris, Crawford enrolled at the Académie Colarossi in 1932, followed by time spent at the Académie Scandinave a year later.

== Work ==
In 1934, he had his first one-man show at the Maryland Institute College of Art. Crawford is best known for his abstract paintings of urban life and industry. His early work placed him with Precisionist artists like Niles Spencer and Charles Sheeler. Here, the focus was on realistic, sharp portrayals of factories, bridges, and shipyards.

Ralston enlisted in the Army in Buffalo on July 8, 1942 and was assigned to the 603rd Engineer Camouflage Battalion at Fort Meade. This was a unit in what later became known as the Ghost Army. He stayed there for about seven months and then transferred to Washington, DC where he served as the chief of visual presentation in the United States Army Air Force, weather division.

Later work was geometrically abstract. In Spain, he observed bullfighting, and the religious procession during Holy Week in Seville. In New Orleans, he painted and photographed cemeteries and jazz musicians (requiring a permit to visit bars normally restricted to blacks). Fortune Magazine sent Crawford to the Bikini Atoll in 1946 to record a nuclear weapons test.

In 1971, the Contemporary Arts Center in Cincinnati held a retrospective of his work. In 1972 Crawford won an award from the National Academy of Design.

== Death ==
On April 27, 1978, Crawford died of cancer in Houston, Texas. He was survived by his wife Peggy (1917–2015) and three children (Neelon, John and Robert). Crawford is buried in St. Louis Cemetery No. 3 in New Orleans, a short distance from one of the Catholic cemeteries in which he produced many of his works.

At that time of his death, his works were included in the public collections of the Honolulu Museum of Art, the Metropolitan Museum of Art, the Museum of Modern Art, the Whitney Museum of American Art, the Walker Art Center, and the Toledo Museum of Art.

His wife, Peggy Frank Crawford, a founder of the Modern Art Society, which would later become the Contemporary Arts Center in Cincinnati, Ohio, died April 18, 2015.

== Collections ==
The Addison Gallery of American Art (Andover, Massachusetts), the Clay Center for the Arts and Sciences (Charleston, West Virginia), the Fred Jones Jr. Museum of Art (University of Oklahoma); the Georgia Museum of Art (University of Georgia); Harvard University Art Museums, the Hirshhorn Museum and Sculpture Garden (Washington D.C.), the Honolulu Museum of Art, the J. Paul Getty Museum (Los Angeles), the Museum of Fine Arts, Boston, the James A. Michener Art Museum (Doylestown, Pennsylvania), the Kemper Museum of Contemporary Art (Kansas City, Missouri), the Kresge Art Museum (Michigan State University), the Los Angeles County Museum of Art, the Mead Art Museum (Amherst College), the Museum of Modern Art (New York City), the Saint Louis Art Museum, the National Gallery of Art (Washington D.C.), the Norton Museum of Art (West Palm Beach, Florida), The Phillips Collection (Washington D.C), the San Francisco Museum of Modern Art, the Smithsonian American Art Museum (Washington D.C.), the Tweed Museum of Art (University of Minnesota, Duluth), the Walker Art Center (Minnesota), the Utah Museum of Fine Arts (Salt Lake City), the Cincinnati Art Museum (Cincinnati, Ohio), the Munson-Williams-Proctor Arts Institute (Utica, New York), and the Whitney Museum of American Art Jule Collins Smith Museum of Fine Art(Auburn University, Alabama),(New York City) are among the public collections holding work by Ralston Crawford.
