= Stanisław Grabowski =

Polish painter (1901 - 1957)

Stanisław Grabowski (1901–1957) was a Polish painter. The largest collection of his works can be found in the National Museum in Warsaw and the Museum of Art in Łódź, where a rich collection of pre-war European avant-garde art was created thanks to the help and involvement of Grabowski and his then wife, Nadia Khodasevich.

== Life ==
Born in Libawa (now Liepāja in Latvia) to Witold Grabowski (a customs official and long-time deputy on Liepāja City Council) and Karolina Missan (born in Kaluny, great-grandson of Konstancja Gładkowska, the first love and muse of Fryderyk Chopin), Grabowski attended the School of Commerce, where his first drawing teacher was Kajetan Szklerys, under whose supervision he copied Józef Pankiewicz's paintings and painted landscapes. In 1914 his family moved to Rybinsk on the river Volga, where he continued his education in the studio of Mikhail Shcheglov. After the outbreak of the October Revolution he stayed in Saint Petersburg, encountering European painting for the first time on his visits to the Hermitage Museum.

In 1919 he left to study at the Warsaw School of Fine Arts under Karol Tichy, Władysław Skoczylas and Wojciech Jastrzębowski. During classes in Mieczysław Kotarbiński's studio in 1923 he met Nadia Khodasevich, marrying her a year later. In 1926 the couple left for Paris where they continued their studies at the Académie Moderne under the supervision of Fernand Léger and Amédée Ozenfant. She began an affair with Léger and separated from Grabowski in 1927 after having one daughter together. A divorce followed in 1932, after which he spent three years in Spain before returning to Paris.

He lived in Nice, near Grasse and other locations in the south of France during the Second World War. After the end of the war, he returned to Paris and settled at the famous 'La Ruche' at 2 du passage de Dantzig in the city's 15th arrondissement. In 1952 he took in Mieczysław Janikowski, a young painter who after World War II initially lived in Great Britain. In 1950s Grabowski was active in Parisian artistic life, exhibiting at the Paris Salon and in private galleries as well as in London and New York and at Polish galleries in Warsaw, Poznań and Kielce. He died in Chartres.
