= Georges Bauquier =

French painter (1910-1997)

Georges Bauquier (31 March 1910 – 2 April 1997) was a French painter.

He was a studio assistant to Fernand Léger, the French painter, sculptor, and filmmaker, and after the latter's death he and Léger's widow Nadia built and opened the musée Fernand-Léger in Biot, dedicated to Léger's work, which became a national museum in 1969 and of which he was director until 1993.

== Life ==
He was born in Aigues-Mortes and during his childhood in Nîmes he showed a taste for drawing. In 1934 he joined the École des beaux-arts de Paris then two years later the École d'art contemporain headed by Léger (1881-1955), becoming its 'massier'. He joined the French Communist Party and the French Resistance, being imprisoned for the latter at the prison de la Santé in 1944.

Léger returned from the USA after the war and met Bauquier again. Early in the 1950s Léger acquired the farmhouse of Saint-André property in Biot, where he displayed large ceramic sculptures. After Léger's death Nadia and Bauquier decideded to build a museum not far from that farmhouse to display Léger's works - the first stone was laid in February 1957 and it was opened on 13 May 1960 by Gaëtan Picon, director general of Arts and Literature. He also married Nadia, as her third husband.

In 1967 Nadia and Bauquier chose 348 important paintings, drawings, ceramics, tapestries and bronzes from Léger's studio at Gif-sur-Yvette and donated them to the French state. On 4 February 1969 André Malraux, minister for cultural affairs, opened the new "musée national Fernand-Léger" to house the works, with the two donors becoming its first directors and its collections later bolstered by deposits of works, paintings and drawings belonging to the pair. After Nadia's death in 1982, an extension doubled the museum's display space between 1987 and 1989.

Bauquier published Fernand Léger, Vivre dans le vrai (Paris, Maeght, 1987) and from 1990 edited the eight-volume catalogue raisonné of Léger's work. He retired as the museum's director in 1993. Seriously ill, he retired to Callian, where he died and was buried in 1997.

== Bibliography ==
- (in French) Georges Bauquier : dessins – peintures, preface by Jean Lescure, Paris, Centre d’art international, 1971.
- (in French) André Verdet, Georges Bauquier : De l'arbre…, preface by Michel Gaudet, Biot, Éditions du musée national Fernand-Léger, 1986, p. 84
- (in French) Georges Tabaraud, Raphaël Monticelli, André Verdet, Jean Lescure, Jean Bouret and André Parinaud, Georges Bauquier : peintures, dessins, sculptures, Biot, musée national Fernand-Léger, 1992, p. 112
