= Stasys Ušinskas =

Lithuanian artist (1905–1974)

- Born: 20 July 1905; Pakruojis, Russian Empire
- Died: 14 June 1974 (aged 68); Kaunas, Lithuanian SSR
- Education: Kaunas Art School; Académie Julian; Conservatoire National des Arts et Métiers; Académie Moderne
- Movement: Modernism, Cubism, Art Deco
- Spouse(s): Sofija Ušinskienė Juozapo (?-1965) Vitalija Blažytė Ušinskienė (m. 1965, died)
- Children: Vida Ušinskaitė (1936–1976); Jūratė Ušinskaitė (1936–1996); Rasa Ušinskaitė (1961)
- Awards: Gold and silver medals in the Exposition Internationale des Arts et Techniques dans la Vie Moderne, Paris (1937); Lithuanian State Prize of the Soviet Republic (1970)

Stasys Ušinskas (20 July 1905 – 14 June 1974) was a Lithuanian artist of multiple creative fields: modern painting, stained glass, scenography, animation, puppetry and decorative glass artworks. He is widely regarded as the "father of Lithuanian stained glass art".

== Early life and education ==
Stasys Ušinskas was born in Pakruojis, a city situated in northern Lithuania, to a family of stonebreaker Juozas Ušinskas, his mother Sofija Ušinskaitė and his siblings Filomena, Romas, Alfonsas. Between 1908 (1909?) and 1914, the family lived in the United States. In 1914, Stasys returned to Lithuania and in 1925 graduated from the Šiauliai Gymnasium. Between 1925 and 1929 he studied painting in Kaunas Art School and frequented the art studio of Justinas Vienožinskis. Following the 1929 student strike, Justinas Vienožinskis and Juozas Mikėnas encouraged Ušinskas to continue his studies in Paris.

In 1929–1931, Ušinskas studied at the Académie Julian and later attended lectures by Henri-Marcel Magne at the Conservatoire national des arts et métiers (National Conservatory of Arts and Crafts). In 1930, Aleksandra Ekster has encouraged Ušinskas to join the Académie Moderne where he attended Ekster’s lectures on scenography, Fernand Léger’s lectures on painting and Le Corbusier’s abstract composition. Stasys Ušinskas has later remembered his formative years in Paris in the following words :

Having had come to Paris without a grant, I had to undertake a variety of additional jobs: I drew cinema posters, later I worked as a scenographer in the theatre ‘Folies Bergère’. There I met theatre scenographer Aleksandra Ekster – she created decorations and costumes for some plays. Thanks to her, I got into the Académie Moderne, for which I had to pay 300 franc per month (otherwise I wouldn’t have been able to study [there] without the salary received from the given [theatrical] projects). At the time, Léger’s painting was a novelty. It has immediately enticed my interest, I turned towards that path- and pursued it. Whereas Classical painting became mundane, he [Léger] created a foundation for a new composition. Arrangement of colors, composition in Léger’s artworks is not very complicated, merely simplified, however he attains a clear decorative, monumental, expressive construction. He used to say: ‘Don’t go to museums, don’t visit them, run from them, rather go to the shops, observe window-cases…’ F. Léger was not preoccupied with atmosphere, perspective, but with plane, constructive issues. While teaching the drawing, he claimed that you cannot isolate drawing because painting is a synthesis of a color and composition.

S. Ušinskas' final graduation work included a project of decorations and costumes for Sophocles' tragedy "Oedipus Rex" and Shakespeare's drama "Othello".

Stasys Ušinskas, having absorbed the expressions of constructionism, cubism, neoclassicism and Art Deco into historical, allegorical, genre painting and portraiture, embodied the spirit of his time, modernised the shapes of his works and kept in step with the world art avant-garde.

In 1931, Ušinskas returned to Lithuania and organized the first solo exhibitions in Kaunas and Šiauliai. His scenography works drew interest of Andrius Oleka-Žilinskas, the director of the State Theater, who invited Ušinskas to work in the theater. S. Ušinskas also worked with Lithuanian writer Balys Sruoga and the famous Russian actor and director Mikhail Chekkov.

In 1932, Ušinskas designed numerous performances in drama, opera and ballet theaters. In 1934, Ušinskas became a professor at Kaunas Art School and taught monumental painting, stained glass and scenography design. Between 1935 and 1940, Ušinskas manages a decorative painting studio at Kaunas Art School. Ušinskas took over the leadership of the studio and soon became an authority in set design, demanding that his students master constructive thinking and logic in design, and emphasizing the importance of new technologies, also instructing students in the proper exhibition of artistic works.

== Scenography and marionettes ==
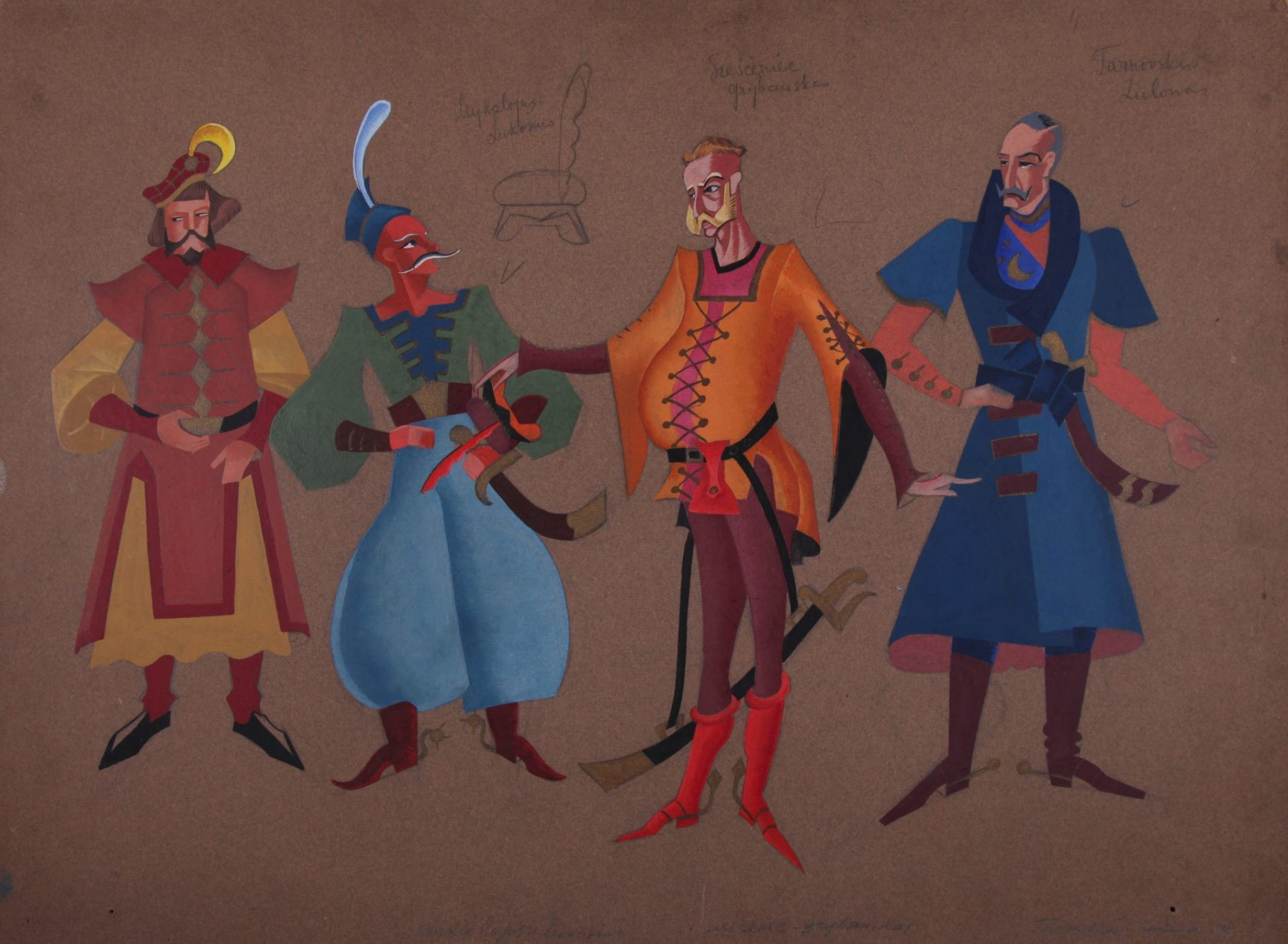
Stasys Ušinskas' Costume Designs for Balys Sruoga's 'Milžino paunksmė' (1934), directed by Andrius Oleka-Žilinskas.

In 1935, Ušinskas created a number of marionettes for the first Lithuanian puppet play Silvester Fife (Silvestras Dūdelė) directed by Antanas Gustaitis and in 1938 for the first Lithuanian sound animation The Fat-Man's Dream (Storulio sapnas).According to Audronė Girdzijauskaitė:

Ušinskas seems to be looking for a universal space that would equally suit a dramatic or musical piece by interpreting, improvising and playing. He was preoccupied with the issues of figure and object within space. Ušinskas took deep interest in the prehistory of theatrical puppets and masks. Having created unique dynamic marionettes of constructive shape and large size, and establishing a puppet show in 1936, he became the initiator of a professional Lithuanian puppet theatre.

A year later (1937), Ušinskas received gold and silver medals at the Exposition Internationale des Arts et Techniques dans la Vie Moderne for scenography design of Balys Dvarionas ballet Matchmaking (1933).

In 1937, Ušinskas traveled to New York to organize the solo exhibition at the Roger Smith Gallery. During this year, Ušinskas received a patent for the sketches of marionettes and used it for the creation of puppets. He also created decorations and costumes for the August Strindberg's play The Bridal Crown (in the Broadway Theater) and Euridipes' The Trojan Women. He created two puppets and decorations for the Broadway Theatre play The Nightingale (based on the tale by Hans Christian Andersen), however the creative work was interrupted by World War II.

In 1938, Ušinskas returned to Lithuania and finalized the creation of puppets for the first Lithuanian short film with sound effects The Fat-Man's Dream based on the puppetoon technique. The novel technology of Ušinskas' puppets allowed to flexibly move various body parts, express certain emotions and traits of the characters from the story.

In 2019, 'Ušinskas' puppet film The Fat-Man's Dream and collection of puppet sketches were inscribed onto the Lithuanian National Memory of the World Register' by the UNESCO.

== Stained-glass and decorative glass artworks ==
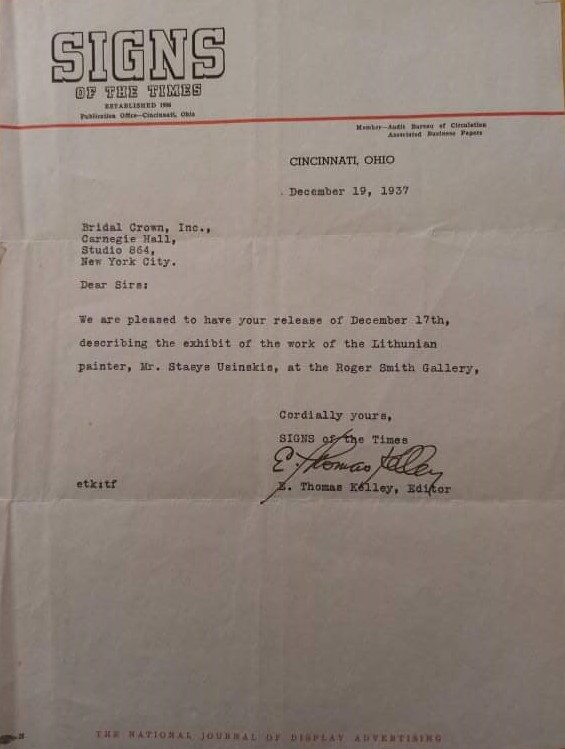
Stasys Ušinskas' exhibition at the Roger Smith Gallery in New York on December 19, 1937

After the return from studies in Paris, Ušinskas created the first stained-glass pieces for the Church of Vytautas the Great in Kaunas. Žydrūnas Mirinavičius describes the formative influence of studies in Paris felt in Ušinskas artworks such as Saint (1931):

This work in its character and spirit is close to stained-glass art of Romanesque period, though its stylisation evokes French modernists' constructivist thinking of the beginning of the 20th century.

Stasys Ušinskas continues working with stained-glass and creates numerous pieces for public places in Lithuania and later in Russia, some of which:

- 1937-1938: Subject based stained-glass works Lithuanian Girl and Builder for the Chamber of Commerce and Industry in Kaunas.
- 1939-1947: A series of stained-glass pieces Mindaugas and Vytautas for the Berčiūnai Church in Panevežys.
- 1940: St. Casimir and St. Joseph for the Šančiai Church.
- 1945-1947: A series of stained-glass works for the Christ's Resurrection Church in Kaunas.
- 1946: Žalgiris Battle stained-glass piece now in the M.K. Čiurlionis Museum of Art.
- 1964: Students in Practical Training now in Kaunas University of Technology (KTU).
- 1965: Kristijonas Donelaitis stained-glass piece now in the M.K. Čiurlionis Museum of Art.
- 1968: Juratė and Kastytis
- 1972: Eglė the Queen of Serpents ('Eglė žalčių karalienė') now situated in the Kretinga City's Cultural Centre (Kretingos rajono kulturos centras).

''The stained-glass pieces evoke a variety of stylistic influences such as Art Deco, Cubism, Constructivism, with Gothic, Renaissance and Classicism details, under which Stasys Ušinskas developed traditional, historical and Lithuanian literature narratives.''

''In 1950, Ušinskas began scientific and technical experiments with stained-glass formed a low-temperature and was the first in Lithuania to produce mirror and block stained glass. Ušinskas, already known for his work in the interwar period, was forced by circumstance and a loss of commissions to begin experimenting at the Aleksotas glass factory, where he set up his own small workshop equipped with a small, liquid fuel-fired furnace. There, he created low-fire fine glass works: vases, plates, aquarium bowls, lamps, and small glass figurines.''

''Ušinskas decorated his creations using stained glass painting techniques: employing silicate paints (glazes), enamels, metal film, gilding and silver plating. Flaws in the furnace's construction often led to contamination of the molten glass, but glazing would usually cover up shoddy glass. Initially, Ušinskas used the supply of paints that he had brought with him from Paris, and later turned to mixing his own glazes.''

In 1950’s and 1960’s, Stasys Ušinskas created decorative glass vessels including vases and decorative plates.

Glass vases were usually painted with glaze and enamel paint, covered with a metal sheet, and sometimes gilded or silvered. These pieces are notable for streamline silhouettes of vessels, majestic forms, contrast between glass material and décor as well stylistically varied painting which resulted from both the influences that impacted Ušinskas’ pre-war creative works and the realities of the Lithuanian fine arts in the 1950’s and 1960’s.

''As an instructor at the Kaunas Institute for Applied and Decorative Arts, Ušinskas trained many talented artists whose later works would bring renown to Lithuanian stained glass artistry: Algimantas Stoškus, Kazimieras Morkūnas, Vladas Jankauskas, Vytautas Banys, Rita Gabrėnaitė, and Rachilė Krukaitė. His student Algimantas Stoškus remembers'':

Ušinskas impressed us with his personality, his teaching method ("understand form, then try to render it"), and his personal workshop. There, he had his own small wood-fired furnace where students could fire their glasswork for academic projects. My life turned to stained glass because of my training with Ušinskas.

During the work in Aleksotas glass factory, Stasys Ušinskas was often assisted by his sister Filomena Ušinskaitė and other students, one of them was his second wife Vitalija Blažytė (1926–1999) who will become an important collaborator in a variety of glass artworks and a muse for Stasys Ušinskas' stained-glass pieces and paintings.

== Painting ==
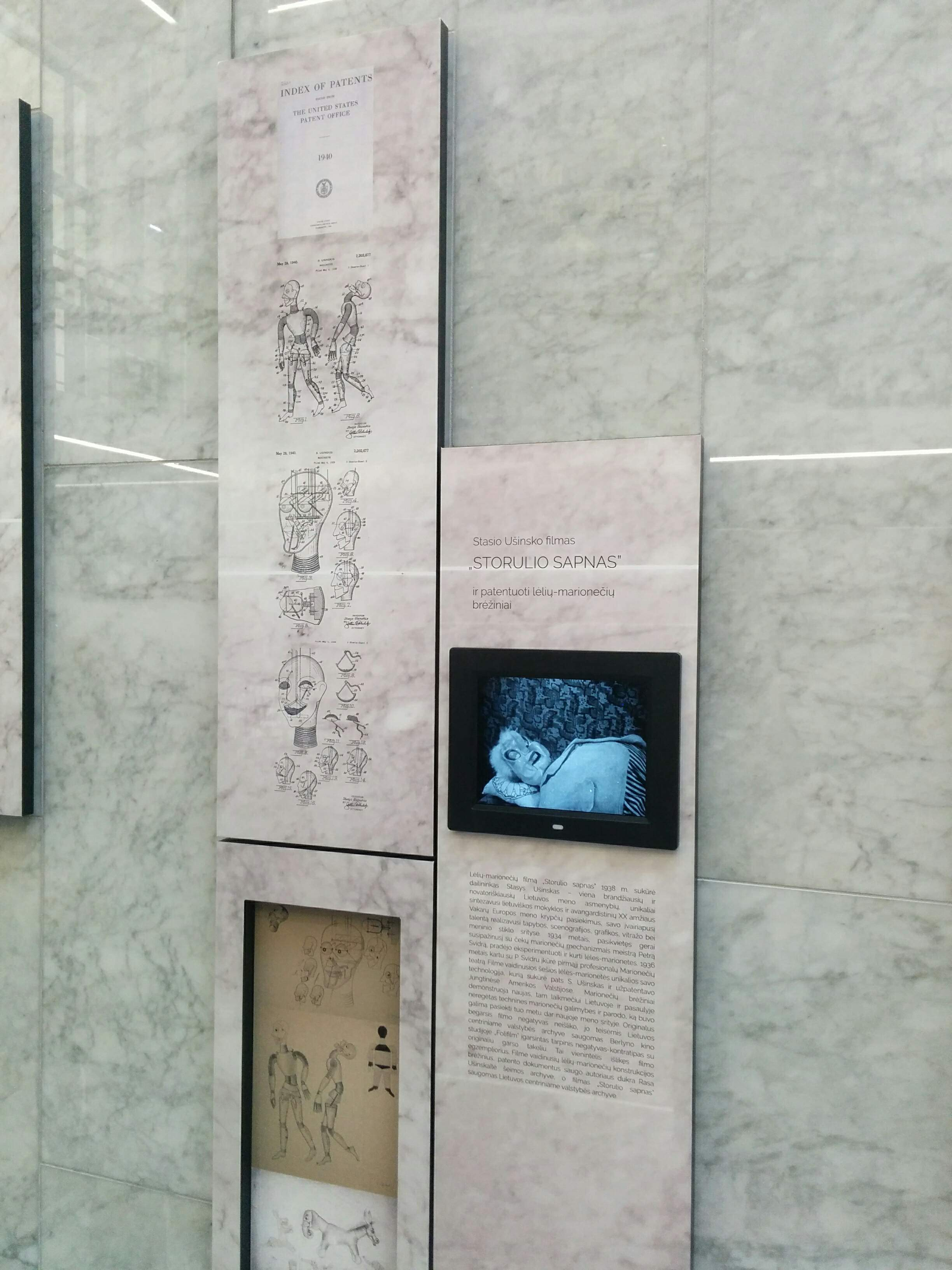
The UNESCO plaques for Stasys Ušinskas' patent of marionettes and The Fat-Man's Dream animation, Vilnius, 2019.

‘In Paris, teacher H. M. Magne and his milieu cultivated the perception of monumentality and the skills of drawing construction which inclined Ušinskas to constructive principles, emphasis on drawing architectonics and rigid compositional structures.’

‘From Ekster Ušinskas picked up laconic expression, synthesized shapes and the sense of structurally worked out spaces. Ušinskas tied in his teacher’s scenographic experience with painting by seeking constructive clarity, and static and dynamic synthesis of rhythm.’

‘Unlike Léger, he was not impressed by the objects of machinery, though both were close in terms of going into details, combinations of decorative lines and shapes, and dynamic contrasts. Owing to Léger, Ušinskas succeeded in escaping the ‘chamber’ style of painting that reigned in Lithuania, while treating many standard themes unconventionally.’

The formative influence of the Parisian teachers could be observed in a number of Ušinskas’ drawings and paintings of ‘multi-figured and monumental compositions’ depicting ‘sportive bodies, balanced proportions, movements, complex perspectives and sculptural dimensions’ such as Spring (plafond for the Kaunas Aviation House) 1937; Music (plafond for the Broadway Theatre) 1938, Circus Rehearsal ('Cirko Repeticija') 1938-1945, Aviator's Dream (Lakūno Sapnas) 1939.

Since the Soviet occupation of Lithuania in 1939, Lithuanian artists were placed under a pressure of the Soviet Union’s political propaganda. As an avant-garde artist, Stasys Ušinskas had to balance his artworks between the soviet ideology forced by the instructions and the artistic principles.

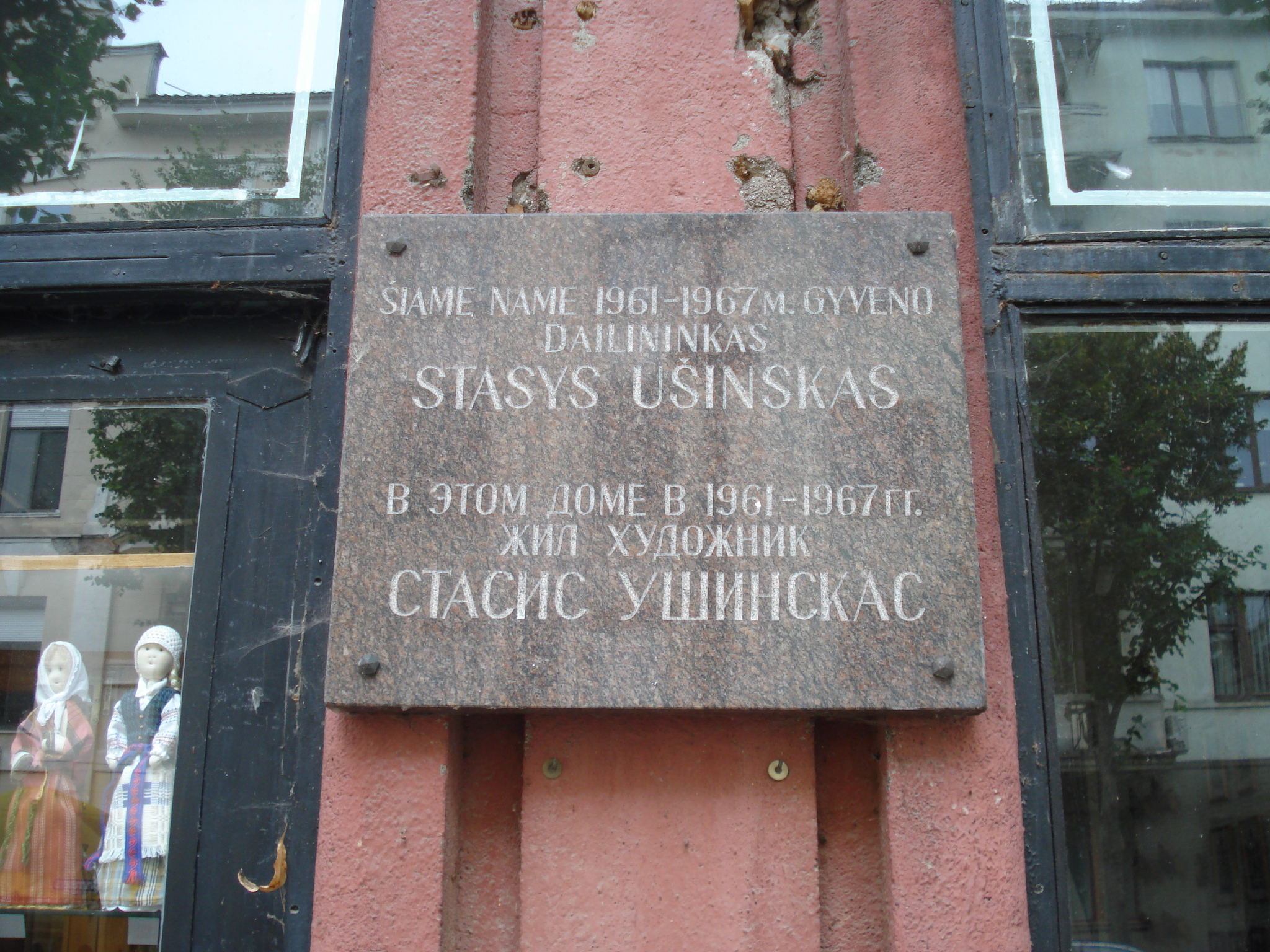
Memorial plaque to Ušinskas

‘Their maneuvering between official and private lives, between the public and the personal, brought new discoveries as well as new lows of conformism.’ One of the examples in Stasys Ušinskas work is A Midsummer Night's Dream (Vasaros Nakties Sapnas, 1938) in which appears his wife’s Vitalija Blažytė’s portrait like compositions. In her personal notes Vitalija Blažytė writes:

The idea was born long time ago. The first time He was reading Shakespeare’s ‘A Midsummer Night's Dream’ while traveling on a boat across the Atlantic. I remember that He read it again before starting [to work on a painting]. This work was realised after we have experienced our own ‘midsummer night's dream’. The painting was intended to be executed in a Cubist style, but under the new circumstances He was forced to realise it in a form of Realism. Like with every large-scale work, He began by studying every figure with a model, I posed to Him for the central figure.

The publication of Stasys Ušinskas letters to his wife Vitalija Blažytė who was exiled to Siberia‘s gulags between 1940 and 1957 reveal the life in a post-war Lithuania and the details of Stasys Ušinskas work specifics, professional life. In the letters, Ušinskas also mentions his students Vytautas Cipljauskas, Sofija Veiverytė and Kazys Varnelis whose early works evoke strong Ušinskas’ influence.

== Memorial ==
1. A memorial plaque in S. Daukanto g. 15, Kaunas where Stasys Ušinskas lived in 1961–1967 m.
2. A memorial plaque in Baritonų g. 6, Kaunas, next to the former house and studio (1968–1974) of Stasys Ušinskas.
3. A memorial plaque in Martynas Mažvydas National Library of Lithuania for Stasys Ušinskas' patent of marionettes' construction and his animation The Fat-Man's animation which were inscribed to the Memory of the World Register by the UNESCO in 2019.
4. Stasys Ušinskas museum
5. Monument for Stasys Ušinskas
