= Lore Krüger =

Lore Krüger (1914–2009) was a German-Jewish photographer and Nazi resistor, known most notably for her photographs taken in pre-World War II Europe. Born in Magdeburg, Germany as the first child to Jewish parents on March 11, 1914, Krüger grew up taking photographs. As her family fled from rising Nazi sentiment in Germany, Lore Krüger and her camera captured emigration and resistance in a turbulent pre-World War II Europe. She was influenced by Marxism and German Expressionism, such as New Objectivity.

== Early years ==
Lore Krüger was born as Lore Heinemann on March 14, 1914. Her father, Ernest Heinemann, was an engineer, and gave her a camera for her tenth birthday. After her father lost his job at a bank, her parents relocated. Krüger travelled to London, Mallorca, Barcelona, Paris, Marseille, Trinidad, New York, Wisconsin, and Berlin to escape Nazi sentiment and the second World War. Lore Krüger brought her camera with her and took pictures in all of these places. She became an icon of the emancipated women in the avant-garde movement of the 1930s and 1940s.

=== Career ===
Krüger fled Germany in 1933 and moved to London. While there, she worked as an au pair. After London, she followed her parents to Mallorca where they relocated after her father lost his job. Next, she moved to Barcelona where she studied photography with Zerkowitz. The next move was to Paris, where she studied in a Bauhaus studio under Florence Henri. While in France, she practiced her photography and excelled in portraits. She worked to perfect her trade and soon entered into the group of great female photographers of the time. She stood with the anti-Nazi agitators at this time as well. Krüger was still a German in France, while France was at war with Germany, and she was considered an enemy. Krüger was sent to an internment camp in 1940 where she stayed for six months. After being released, she fled with her fiancé, Ernst Krüger, on a ship destined for Mexico. With both Mexican as well as U.S. visas, Krüger, her fiancé, and her sister, Gisela, hoped to gain refuge in North America. On the journey, the ship was seized by the Dutch army and the three were placed in a British internment camp outside in Trinidad. After release, Krüger emigrated to New York. Lore Heinemann married Ernst Krüger in New York in 1942 and they founded a newspaper called the German-American Newspaper while still in exile from Nazi Germany. She worked primarily as an interpreter and translator, and also was a portrait photographer. Krüger and her family returned to Germany after the war in 1946 to "create anew" after the war. She worked as a translator of prolific American literature during this time including authors Mark Twain, Joseph Conrad, and Henry James.

=== After death ===
Krüger's photography career ended upon her return to Germany in 1946. Throughout her travels during her exile, she had collected 250 photographs ranging from gypsies to farms to prolific lawyers in New York. Irja Kratke and Cornelia Bastlein viewed her work shortly before Krüger's death, however Krüger was not interested in the publicity of an exhibition. After Krüger's death in 2009, Kratke and Bastlein worked hand in hand with C/O Berlin to be the first institution to exhibit this artist's work.
