= Theo Stavropoulos =

Greek American painter (1930–2007)

- Theo Stavropoulos c. 1970
- Born: 3 June 1930; Athens
- Died: 11 March 2007 (aged 76); Maine
- Education: Beaux-Arts de Paris, Yale University
- Occupation: Artist, painter
- Website: theostavropoulosart.com

Theo Stavropoulos (1930–2007) was a Greek American painter.

== Life and education ==
Born in Athens in June 1930, Stavropoulos lived in Greece during the Axis occupation, during which his parents became imprisoned. He entered art school when he was thirteen, was a member of the Greek Resistance, and studied art with the surrealist painter Giorgos Gounaropoulos.

After the war, he studied art in Paris with Fernand Léger, and at Yale University with Josef Albers on a Yale University scholarship. He received the Prix Lefranc in 1952. He married in Athens in 1959, and by the early 1960s, the couple had a daughter and lived in New Haven, Connecticut. By 1965, he had been exhibited in Europe and the US, and had designed the interior of a New Haven church.

He taught at the University of Bridgeport and Lehman College, where he worked for 25 years.

In 1980, the gallery that represented him closed. From then on, he showed his work only to family and friends, and so largely disappeared from public attention. He died in his home Maine in March 2007. In 2013, an exhibition of his work called Offerings of Light was held at the Lehman College art gallery.

== Art ==
Watertown Town Times said in 1965 that "His paintings are noted for a serene simplicity glowing with quiet color. His technique creates a synthesis between the Grecian ideal and modern western culture." Arts Magazine said the same year "semi-classical nostalgia infuses all of the paintings; ... scrapbooks of a clever expatriate well aware of art history." The magazine commented in 1976 that some of his work were "purposely ambiguous. One could not tell whether he was representing real figures of carvings in stone.", while newer works were "more abstract; one could hardly recognize any of the objects except that they were lights." In 1978, it said he was "creating a kind of pictorial hybrid which seems to hover between the abstract and the real."

Art critic Amei Wallach wrote in 2013 that Stavropoulos tested "the borders between reality and the dream".
