= Paul Crotto =

American artist

Paul Crotto (born 1922, New York; died 2016, Paris) was an American expatriate painter, sculptor and printmaker active in Paris. From the late 1950s, he became a regular denzien of the art colony in the village of Deià on Mallorca, where he was also remembered as an inveterate chess player.

== Early life, WWII service, time in Asia ==
Paul Crotto was born in New York to Polish and German parents, the youngest of three children. He attended the University of Georgia at Athens as a freshman, but was then drafted into the U.S. Navy during World War II. In 1945 he graduated in the Midshipman’s school in Chicago as a Commissioned Officer.

After special training at Harvard University, he became a communication/coding officer for the Navy in India, Chungking, and Shanghai. After the war, he left the Navy and was hired by the U.S. War Department, working in local military administration in Peking and visiting Formosa. After the Communist victory, Crotto exited China via Manchuria, and left the War Department.

Crotto had started painting while in China, and on returning to New York decided to pursue an artistic career, using the G.I. Bill to pay for his further education.

== Art education and career ==
Crotto enrolled at the Art Student League in New York and graduated in 1949. He decided to further his art education in Europe and moved to Paris, where he attended the academy of Fernand Léger. Fellow students included Le Corbusier, Sam Francis and Nicolas de Staël. Crotto rented Georges Braque’s former atelier at Hotel Roma for 9 francs a day.

In 1950, he traveled to Florence and studied for two years at the Accademia di Belle Arti di Firenze. Returning to Paris in 1952, he purchased the atelier just above the Léger academy, sharing his modest accommodation with a then-unknown young French actor, Bernard Fresson.

He made silkscreens and engravings in Atelier Lacourière in Montmartre, a studio created by Roger Lacourière, where he met Henri Matisse and Joan Miró, and he showed his artwork in group exhibitions with Pablo Picasso, Marc Chagall, André Derain and Jean Fautrier.

He also taught art at the American School, where Rita Hayworth’s children, Rebecca and Jasmine, were among his students.

Crotto was discovered by French gallerist Jeanne Castel, who presented his first solo exhibit in 1961. In 1963, Crotto was awarded the Prix International de Villeneuve-sur-Lot. Crotto continued to exhibit his work in solo and group exhibitions in Europe and the United States into the 1970s.

He presented his work at the Salon d'Automne, the Salon du Dessin et de la Peinture à l'Eau, the Salon de la Jeune Peinture, and the Salon Comparaisons. His paintings and silkscreens are included in the collections of Claude Raphaël-Leygues and Lawrence Malkin.

At the end of his life, Crotto resided at the Maison Nationale des Artistes (a retirement home for artists under the auspices of the Fondation des Artistes) in Nogent-sur-Marne, a suburb of Paris. His final show was a retrospective of his work held at the Maison Nationale des Artistes the year of his death, 2016.

== At the Deià art colony; personal life ==
Between 1955 and 1959, Crotto visited the village of Deià on the island of Mallorca for the first time, on the recommendation of his friend the artist and archaeologist William Waldren, who described it as "a paradise on Earth for artists, writers and poets." Crotto became part of the artistic Deià community spearheaded by Robert Graves, and returned there yearly throughout his life.

Among Crotto's closest friends in both Paris and Deià, as reported by literary critic Bruce King in his memoirs, were Waldren, writer Nick Arnold, and Paul Arnoboldi (described by another Deià regular as an "LSD entrepreneur"). According to King, Crotto "was a handsome man who attracted woman," and was married at least three times. While Crotto was

a good painter in the increasingly out-of-date Parisian School...he had avoided following others he knew towards action painting, pop art, minimalism, and other postmodernist styles and that perhaps explained his obsession with chess rather than his own paintings which over the decades would sell poorly and sporadically. Every so many years he would be rediscovered and promoted for a few shows by some gallery and then there would be a wait for the next rediscovery. Meanwhile he played more and more chess, painted less and less, and his wives left him...Deià was a continual chess game that moved from the cafes to the beach to private houses to restaurants to wherever pieces and a board could be set up, [and] one of the most dedicated chess players was Paul Crotto.

"Paul Crotto once told me that Deià was the center of his life," wrote King. "As Arnaboldi disappeared, Bill Waldren, Nick Arnold and others died, he felt the world he knew was dissolving."

== Solo exhibitions ==
- Galerie Jeanne Castel, Paris, 1961, 1962
- Galerie Blanche, Stockholm, 1963
- City of Villeneuve-sur-Lot, 1963
- Galerie René Drouet, Paris, 1964
- Musée d'Art International gallery, San Francisco, 1965
- Galerie Grave, Munich, 1966, 1967
- Galerie René Drouet, Paris, 1968
- Sindin Harris Galleries, New York, 1969
- Galerie René Drouet, Paris, 1978
- Maison Nationale des Artistes, Nogent-sur-Marne, 2016

== Group exhibitions ==
- Mostra di Artisti Americani, Florence, 1951
- Mostra Int, Bordighera, Italy, 1953
- American Painters in France, Galerie Craven, Paris, 1953
- Salon d'Automne, Paris, 1956
- Dix Ans de Prix de Villeneuve-sur-Lot, Paris, 1964
- Obelisk Gallery, Boston, 1964
- Galerie Bernheim Jeune, Paris, 1965
- Sculptures des Peintres, Galerie Le Grall, Paris, 1967 (Group exhibition with François Arnal, André Beaudin, André Derain, Jean Fautrier and Manuel Ruiz Pipo, among others)
- Galerie am Alten Hof, Munich, 1967
- School of Paris, Galerie Juarez, Los Angeles, 1967
- Artists of Europe and Israel, Riverdale, New York, 1968 (Group exhibition with Marc Chagall and Pablo Picasso among others)
- Salon Comparaisons, Musée d'Art Moderne de Paris, 1968
