= Nadia Khodasevich Léger =

French painter (1904–1982)

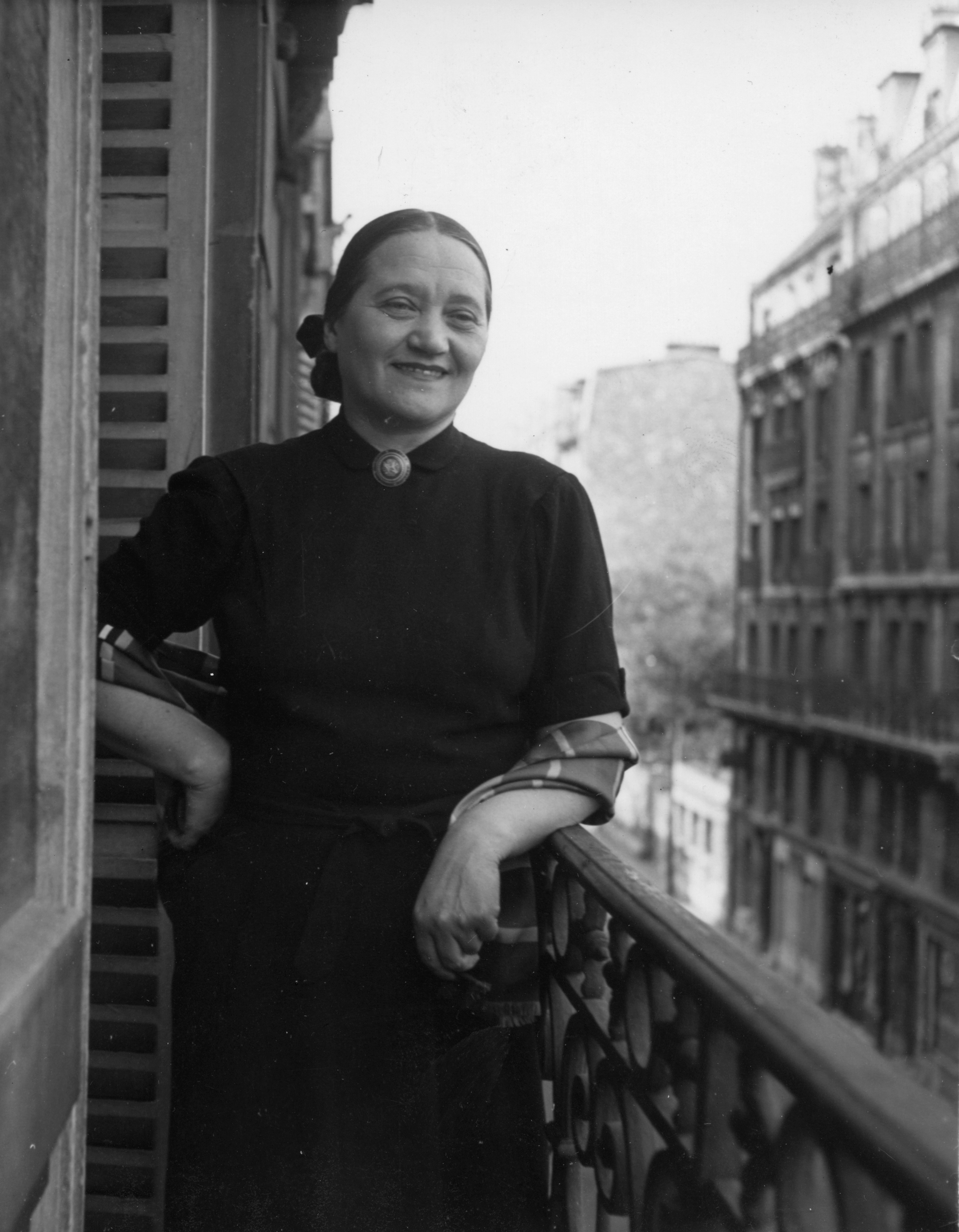
Nadia Khodasevich Léger

Nadia Khodasevich (Grabowski) Léger (Belarusian: Надзе́я Пятро́ўна Хадасе́віч-Лежэ́. Russian: Надежда Петровна Ходасевич-Леже) (23 September 1904 – 7 November 1982) was a painter of Belarusian-Jewish origin, active in Paris from the Interwar era. She was the first wife of Polish painter Stanisław Grabowski and the second wife of French artist Fernand Léger. The Russian form of her name can be transliterated as Nadezhda Khodasevich or Khodassevich or Khodasievitch; and from the Polish form, Wanda Chodasiewicz.

== Early life ==
She was born into a poor family of Polish descent in Asiecišča (also known as Osetishche), then in the Vitebsk Governorate of the Russian Empire, now in the Dokshytsy District of Vitebsk Region in northern Belarus, a few miles west of Lepiel, and roughly equidistant from Vitebsk, Polatsk and Minsk.

From 1919 to 1921, she studied at an art workshop in Smolensk with avant-garde artists Władysław Strzemiński and Kazimir Malevich. She then studied under Miłosz Kotarbiński at the Warsaw Academy of Fine Arts from 1922, where she met and then married Polish painter Stanisław Grabowski in 1923.

== Life in Paris ==
The couple moved to Paris in 1924, and she then studied in Paris at the Académie Moderne (renamed the Académie de l'Art Contemporain in 1934), led by Fernand Léger and Amédée Ozenfant. Léger asked her to teach at the academy, which she did until his death in 1955. Her work was exhibited regularly in Paris from 1926 to 1929, and with the Cercle et Carré association in the 1930s, under the name "Wanda Chodasiewicz-Grabowska"; she later preferred the name "Nadia". She was involved with the a.r. group which donated art to a modern art museum in Łódź in 1929, the Muzeum Sztuki w Łodzi.

She separated from her first husband in 1927, after the birth of their daughter Wanda. They were divorced in 1932.

Fernand Léger remained outside France from October 1940 to December 1945, but Nadia remained in Paris during the occupation of France in the Second World War; she is believed to have been involved with the French resistance. After the death of his first wife Jeanne-Augustine Lohy in 1950, Fernand Léger married Nadia Khodasevich in February 1952, and they lived at Gif-sur-Yvette, in the south-west suburbs of Paris. She was involved in creating many of the works attributed to Léger after the war.

== Later career ==
She ran the Académie with Georges Bauquier, whom she married after Léger's death in 1955.

She collaborated with architect Andreï Svetchine to build the Fernand Léger Museum in Biot, Alpes-Maritimes near Antibes in 1960, which was donated to the French state in 1967. The French Minister of Culture, André Malraux, opened the Musée national Fernand Léger on 4 February 1969. She also converted Léger's farm at Lisores in Normandy into a museum, the Ferme-Musée Fernand Léger, completed in 1970.

She and her second husband were both members of the French Communist Party. She was awarded the USSR Order of the Red Banner of Labour in 1972.

She died in Grasse.
