= Kazys Morkūnas =

Lithuanian stained glass artist (1925–2014)

- Born: circa 1925; Ziezmariai
- Died: January 2014 (age 88); Vilnius
- Resting place: Antakalnio Cemetery
- Known for: Stained glass

Kazys Morkūnas (c. 1925 – 2014) was a Lithuanian stained glass artist. He is considered a master of the form.

He was a student of Stasys Ušinskas and along with fellow pupil Algimantas Stoskus they began creating new methods that incorporated thick panels of glass which have been adopted by other artists.

His 1960 work Morning incorporated a special mirror glass and was the first stained glass work to incorporate a nude from folklore. His work was part of the Soviet Pavilions at both the Expo 67 and Expo 70. He created miniature stained glass replicas of the Lithuanian coat of arms (vytis) as souvenirs which were sold after re-establishment of independence in 1990. He created the large pieces Šventė (Feast) (1980s) and Žalgirio mūšis (The Battle of Grunwald) (2010s) that adorn buildings in the Lithuanian Parliamentary complex.

In 1985, Morkunas was awarded the USSR State Prize. In 2000, he was awarded the 4th Grade Order of the Lithuanian Grand Duke Gediminas by the Lithuanian President, Valdas Adamkus.

He died in January 2014 at the age of 88 and was buried at Antakalnio cemetery.
