= Tubism =

Artistic movement

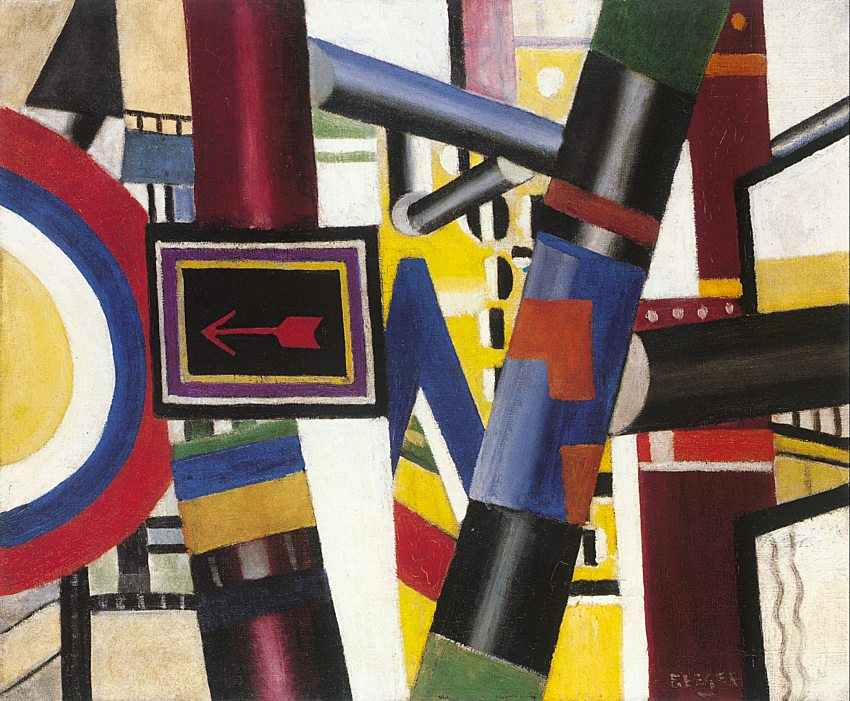
Fernand Léger, The Railway Crossing, 1919, oil on canvas, 53.8 x 64.8 cm, The Art Institute of Chicago, an example of Tubism

Tubisme is a term from the art world that carries two distinct meanings. On the one hand, it refers to a variant within cubism identified by art critic Louis Vauxcelles in 1911, in which artists such as Fernand Léger employed cylindrical, tubular, and spherical forms in vivid colors to suggest movement and dynamism. Meant as derision, the term was inspired by Léger's idiosyncratic version of cubism, in which he emphasized cylindrical shapes. The style was developed by Léger in his paintings of 1909–1919, such as Nudes in the Forest (1909–10) and Soldiers Playing Cards (1917).

On the other hand, the term denotes a painting technique attributed to Georges Mathieu, in which paint is applied directly from the tube onto the canvas.

== Variant of cubism ==
Tubism as a variant of cubism is characterized by tubular and cylindrical structures rendered in bright colors. The style has a graphic quality, emphasizes geometry and dynamism, and introduced the aesthetics of mechanics, machines, and factories into modern art. The term was started in 1911 by Louis Vauxcelles, who mockingly described the early work of Fernand Léger. Léger himself later adopted the term to describe the work he developed after World War I. Rather than a formal art movement, tubism is often seen as a predecessor of Pop art.

== Painting technique ==
French abstract painter Georges Mathieu claimed authorship of the term tubism in a different sense, referring to the technique of applying paint directly from the tube onto the canvas. This method was his own invention and became associated with his practice.
