= Fernand Léger National Museum =

Biographical museum in France

- Musée national Fernand Léger
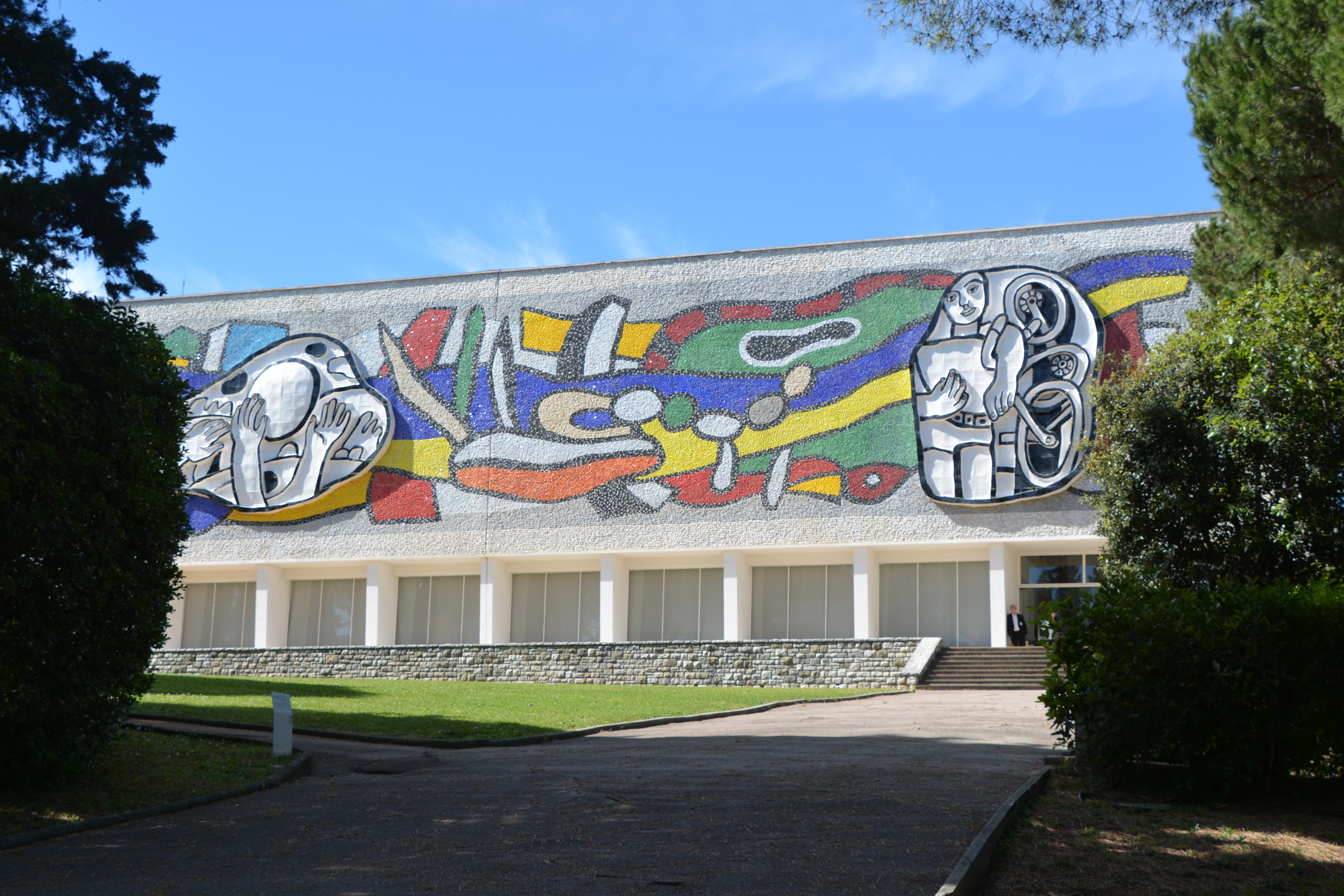
- Established: 1960
- Location: Biot, Alpes-Maritimes, France
- Coordinates: 43.6222°N 7.1129°E
- Type: art museum
- Collection size: paintings, designs, ceramics, bronzes and tapestries of Fernand Léger.
- Website: musees-nationaux-alpesmaritimes.fr/fleger/en

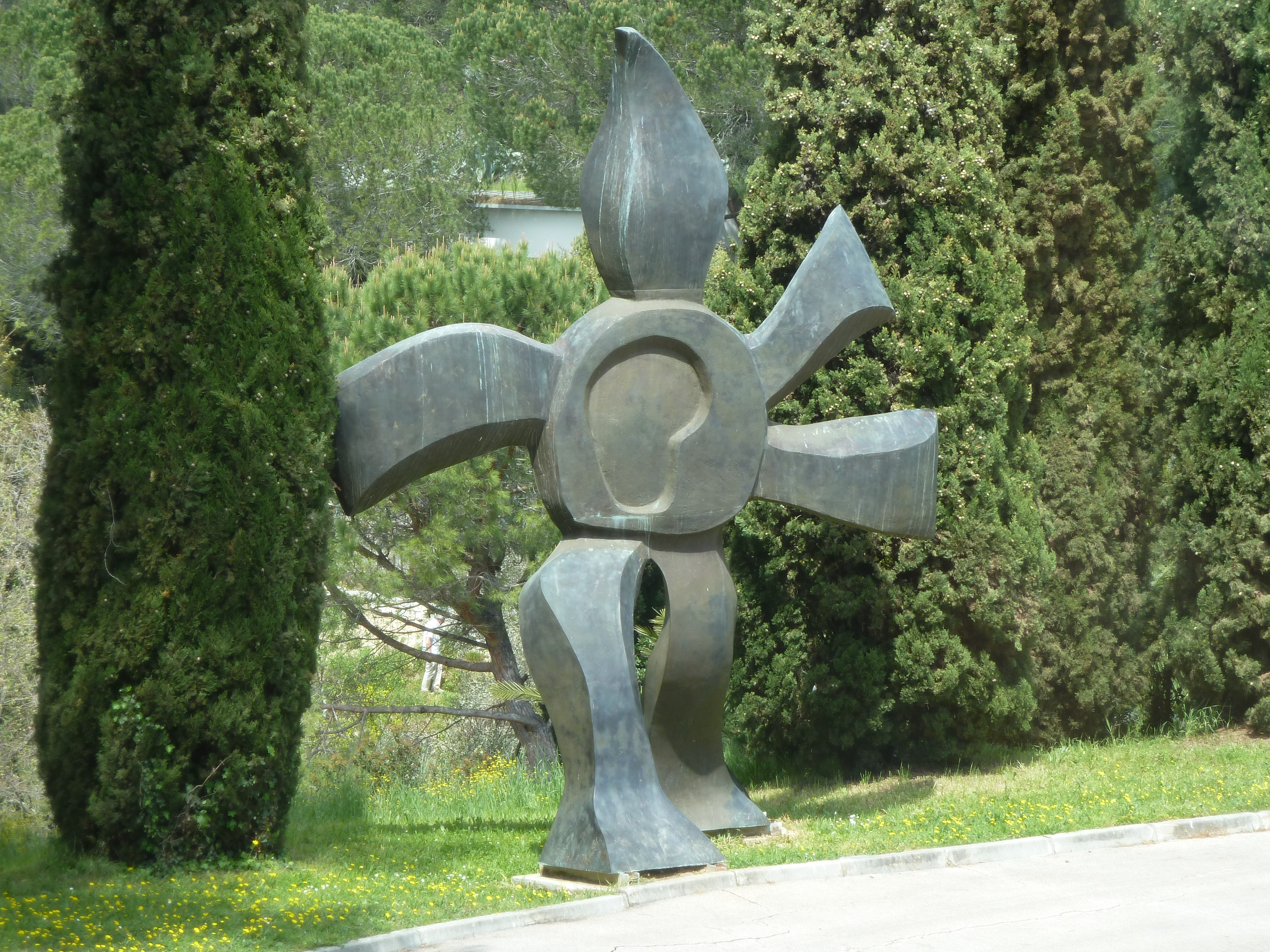
Sculpture in the gardens of the museum

The Fernand Léger National Museum (French: Musée national Fernand Léger) is a museum in Biot, Alpes-Maritimes, in south-eastern France, dedicated to the work of the twentieth-century artist Fernand Léger. Although originally privately owned, it is now a state museum entitled to style itself Musée de France.

== History ==
In 1955, Fernand Léger bought a villa in Biot, called Mas Saint-André, with the intention of installing polychrome ceramic sculptures in his garden, but died soon afterwards. The museum was built on the property after the death of the artist in 1955 by Nadia Léger and Georges Bauquier, to designs by the architect Andreï Svetchine; an earlier design by Paul Nelson had been rejected. Construction began in 1957, and the museum opened in 1960. The gardens were designed by Henri Fish and contain sculptures based on Léger's work.
