= The City (Léger) =

Painting by Fernand Léger

The City (La Ville)
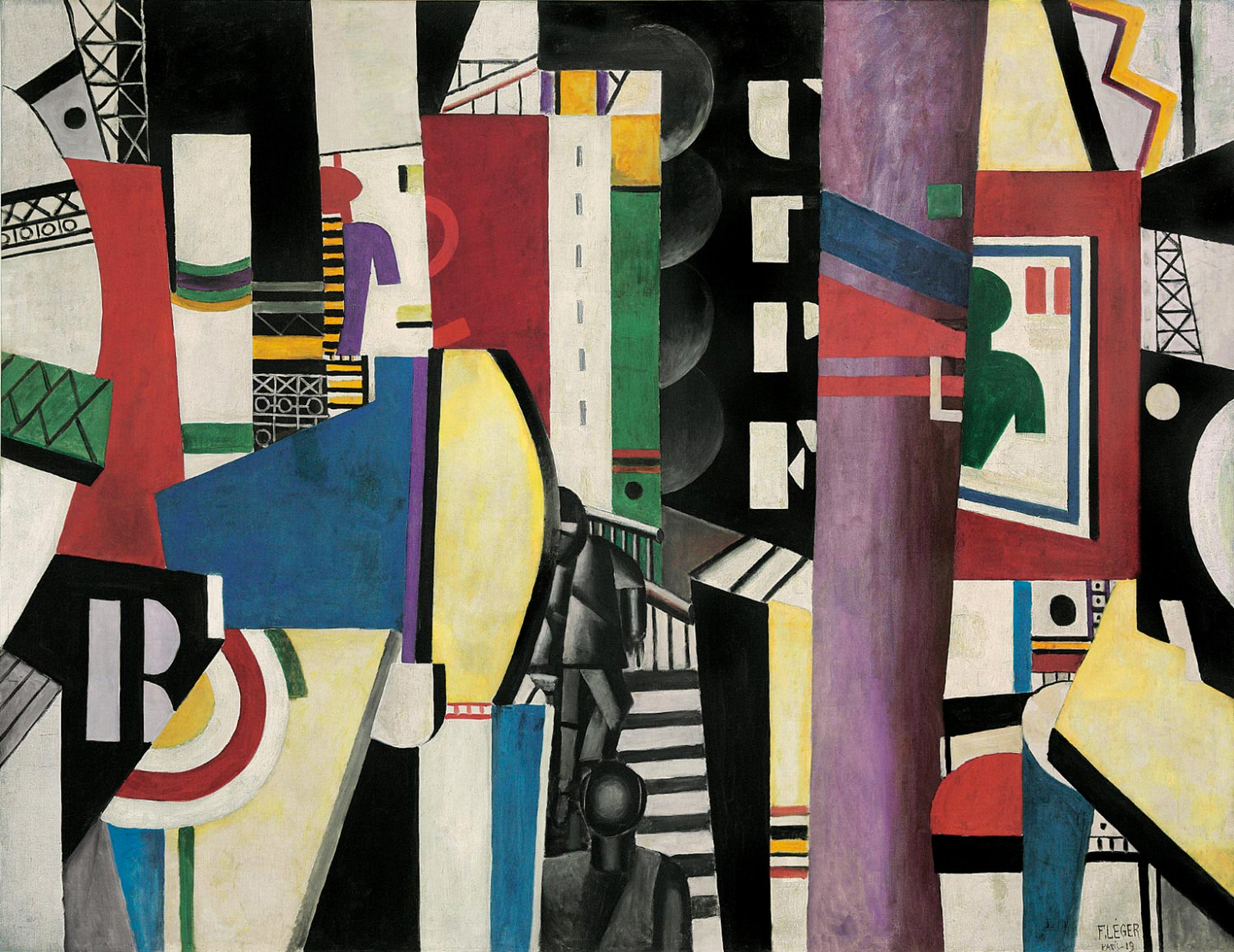
- Artist: Fernand Léger
- Year: 1919
- Medium: Oil on canvas
- Dimensions: 231.1 cm × 298.4 cm (91.0 in × 117.5 in)
- Location: Philadelphia Museum of Art; Philadelphia

The City (French: La Ville) is an oil on canvas painting by French painter and sculptor Fernand Léger, from 1919.

The painting is a Cubist perspective of a city. It is held in the Philadelphia Museum of Art. Albert Eugene Gallatin donated the piece to the museum in 1952 and it has also been shown at the Guggenheim Museum. In reviews of the Guggenheim exhibit, both The City and other works in the show were praised.
