= Florence Henri =

American photographer and painter (1893–1982)

Florence Montagne Henri
- Portrait of Henri by Lucia Moholy
- Born: June 28, 1893; New York City, US
- Died: July 24, 1982 (aged 89); Laboissière-en-Thelle, France
- Movement: Cubism, Constructivism

Florence Henri (28 June 1893 – 24 July 1982) was a surrealist artist; primarily focusing her practice on photography and painting, in addition to pianist composition. In her childhood, she traveled throughout Europe, spending portions of her youth in Paris, Vienna, and the Isle of Wight. She studied in Rome, where she would encounter the Futurists, finding inspiration in their movement. From 1910 to 1922, she studied piano in Berlin, under the instruction of Egon Petri and Ferrucio Busoni. She would find herself landlocked to Berlin during the first World War, supporting herself by composing piano tracks for silent films. She returned to Paris in 1922, to attend the Académie André Lhote, and would attend until the end of 1923. From 1924 to 1925, she would study under painters Fernand Léger and Amédée Ozenfant at the Académie Moderne. Henri's most important artistic training would come from the Bauhaus in Dessau, in 1927, where she studied with masters Josef Albers and László Moholy-Nagy, who would introduce her to the medium of photography. She returned to Paris in 1929 where she started seriously experimenting and working with photography up until 1963. Finally, she would move to Compiègne, where she concentrated her energies on painting until the end of her life in 1982. Her work includes experimental photography, advertising, and portraits, many of which featured other artists of the time.

== Early life ==
Florence Henri born in New York to a French father and a German mother. After the death of her mother in 1895, Henri and her father began traveling for his work as a director of a petroleum company. Henri began to study music in Paris at the age of nine In 1906, Henri and her father settled on the Isle of Wight in England where her father then died in 1908. After the death of her father, Henri went to live in Rome with Gino Gori, a poet who introduced Henri to the avant-garde art movement.

In 1913 Henri moved to Berlin to continue her music studies with pianist-composer Ferruccio Busoni. When World War I broke out in 1914, Henri was trapped in Berlin with her wages frozen. To earn a living, Henri utilized her pianist background and composed music for silent movies. After visiting the Academy of the Arts, Berlin, Henri decided to pursue painting instead of music. Throughout this period, Henri focused on figure studies and landscapes. During this time, she met Jewish German critic and art historian Carl Einstein who became a mentor and close friend until his death in 1940. Following World War I, Henri studied under artists such as Johann Walter-Kurau and Vasily Kandinsky.

In 1924, Henri decided to move to Paris but had trouble obtaining permission to live in France. On June 18, 1924, Henri married Karl Anton Koster in Lucerne. It was a marriage of convenience for Henri to obtain permission to reside in France. Koster and Henri divorced in 1954.

== Education ==
In 1925, Florence Henri enrolled in the Académie Moderne to study under Fernand Léger and Amédée Ozenfant. In the summer of 1925, Polish painter Victor Yanaga Poznanski organized "Exposition International. L'Art d'Aujourd'hui." It was the first international exhibition of avant-garde art in Paris since World War I. Besides Henri, other artists at the exhibit included Piet Mondrian, Paul Klee, and Pablo Picasso. After exhibiting works in the "Exposition de l'Académie Moderne" at the Galerie Aubier in March 1927, Henri enrolled at the Bauhaus in Dessau.

== Career ==
Florence Henri's work occupied a central place in the world of avant-garde photography in the late 1920s. She became a member of the Cercle et Carré group in 1929. At the Bauhaus, Henri met László Moholy-Nagy and enrolled in his summer photography course. She moved into Moholy-Nagy's house and became a close friend of his wife Lucia Moholy who encouraged her to take up photography.

With Florence Henri's photos, photographic practice enters a new phase—the scope of which would have been unimaginable before today. Above and beyond the precise and exact documentary composition of these highly defined photos, research into the effects of light is tackled not only through abstract photograms, but also in photos of real-life subjects ...

— László Moholy-Nagy

By 1928 she had abandoned painting and set up her own studio as a professional freelance photographer in 1929.

One of her self-portraits was published by Moholy-Nagy in i10 Internationale Revue. Moholy-Nagy's critique recognises that her photographs fulfill the tenet of 'making strange' where 'reflections and spatial relationships, overlapping and penetrations are examined from a new perspectival angle'. Many of her photographs incorporate mirrors; Henri used mirrors for her own self-dramatisations, in commercial work and to make portraits of friends such as Jean Arp, Petra Van Doesburg, Sonia Delaunay, Wassili Kandinsky, Fernand Léger, and Margarete Schall. In 1930, she exhibited in the International Exhibition 'Das Lichtbild' The Photograph in Munich. The year after she showed images at a 'Foreign Advertising Photography' exhibition in New York. Her work was compared to that of the photographers Man Ray, László Moholy-Nagy and Adolphe Baron de Mayer, as well as with the winner of the first prize at the exhibition and Bauhaus director, Herbert Bayer. In doing so she joins the ranks of the icons of the avant-garde of this period. The importance of her work was recognized in one-woman exhibitions and publication in various journals, including N-Z Wochenschau. She produced a series of images of the dancer Rosella Hightower.

Having set up her portrait studio in Paris in 1928, by 1930 she was teaching classes of her own which included future successful photographers Gisèle Freund and Lisette Model.

As the second World War approached with the occupation of the Nazi Party, there was a noticeable decline in her photographic work which would have been considered degenerate art. Photographic materials would have become increasingly hard to obtain and Florence Henri returned to abstract painting until her death in the 1980s.

== Legacy ==
Henri's work was included in the 2021 exhibition Women in Abstraction at the Centre Pompidou.

Her work is in the collection of the J. Paul Getty Museum, the Metropolitan Museum of Art, and the Museum of Modern Art.

== See also ==
- Podcast "FLORENCE HENRI | Giovanni Battista Martini, Paola Rosina & Roberto Lacarbonara" on bauhaus faces podcast, host: Dr. Anja Guttenberger, published on Feb. 8, 2025 (Feb. 17, 2026)
- Women of the Bauhaus
