= Académie Moderne =

Former art school in Paris (1924–)

Coordinates: 48.841472°N 2.332417°E

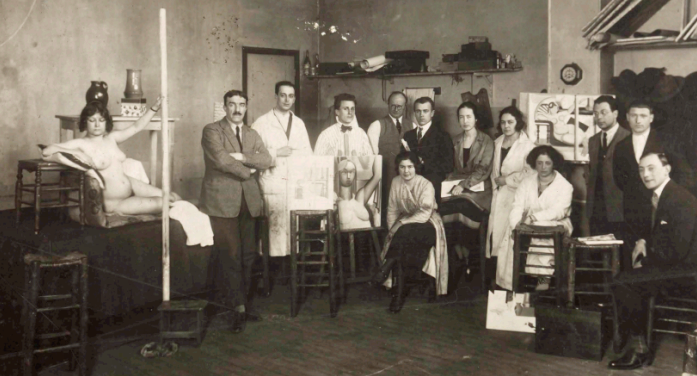
- Académie Moderne c. 1924
- Former names: Académie Léger–Ozenfant
- Type: Private art school
- Established: 1924
- Founders: Fernand Léger, Amédée Ozenfant
- Location: 86, rue Notre-Dame-des-Champs, Paris, France

The Académie Moderne, formerly known as Académie Léger–Ozenfant, was a free art school in Paris. It was founded by Fernand Léger and Amédée Ozenfant in 1924. The school attracted students from Europe and America. Both Léger and Ozenfant taught there, along with Aleksandra Ekster, Otte Sköld, and Marie Laurencin.

Notable students included Tarsila do Amaral, Florence Henri, Blanche Lazzell, Nadia Khodasevich Léger, and Clay Spohn.
