= Muir and Shepherd =

Practice information
- Partners: John Muir; Arthur Shepherd
- Founded: 1947
- Dissolved: 1980
- Location: Melbourne, Victoria, Australia

Significant works and honors
- Buildings: Waller estate, Ballarat; Henderson residence, Ballarat; Jacobson residence, Brighton; Fraser residence, Balwyn North

Muir and Shepherd was an Australian architectural practice established in 1947 by John Muir and Arthur Shepherd with offices in both Ballarat and Melbourne, Victoria. Their projects were predominantly residential buildings. Non-residential work included churches, a funeral parlour and commercial tenancy fitouts. Muir and Shepherd are one of the lesser-known post-war modern Victorian architectural firms.

== Practice ==
John Muir began practising architecture in his hometown of Ballarat in 1933. Following this he moved to Melbourne and joined the practice of Stephenson & Turner, where he was to become a senior draftsman by the 1940s. Stephenson & Turner's health buildings of the 1930s have been noted as creating the 'foundations for Australian functionalist modernism'. While with the practice Muir was to work on health buildings such as the 'perfectly styled', Maternal and Infant Welfare Pathological Block (1939) at The Royal Women's hospital and the Walter and Eliza Hall Institute Building (1939) at the Royal Melbourne Hospital. Both Muir and Shepherd were to work for this firm. During World War II Arthur Shepherd enlisted with the Australian Army (Royal Australian Engineers) in May 1943 and was discharged in May 1946. In 1945, Muir began preliminary work on a major Ballarat housing development: the Waller Estate. The practice of Muir and Shepherd was subsequently established in 1947. The practice was to remain small. Early employees included Ted Gillies, Richard Allen and James Earle. The firm ceased in 1980.

=== Residential designs ===
==== Waller estate, Ballarat ====
Waller estate floor plan

John Muir was to bring this important project to the newly formed practice. Work on the Waller estate was to last for over a decade, with their Ballarat office servicing the development of this ongoing project. Australia experienced severe housing shortages after World War II. Private housing developments were to become common at this time, and were to profoundly change the pattern of Australian residential development. The Waller estate is said to represent the first and most intact example of housing development built by a private consortium in Ballarat. John Muir and the practice of Muir and Shepherd are attributed to the design of the majority of the houses built by the Waller syndicate within this estate. To create architectural diversity throughout the development Muir was commissioned to design a variety of domestic types. It has been noted that in a number of the firms designs that although the front elevations were similar, the plans differed. Described as post-war suburban, most of these houses were brick veneer in construction with terracotta roof tiles with small front porches and windows that wrap around corners. This estate was developed by the Waller consortium until 1961.

Throughout the 1950s both professional and popular journals promoted breaking from traditional housing designs and interior schemes and moving toward a modern style. A few of Muir and Shepherd's residential works featured in popular Australian housing journals of the 1950s as follows. Trends observed through these journals include: the progression of the firm’s designs towards a more modern style, more open-plan designs, more in-built furniture and fittings.

==== Henderson residence, Ballarat ====
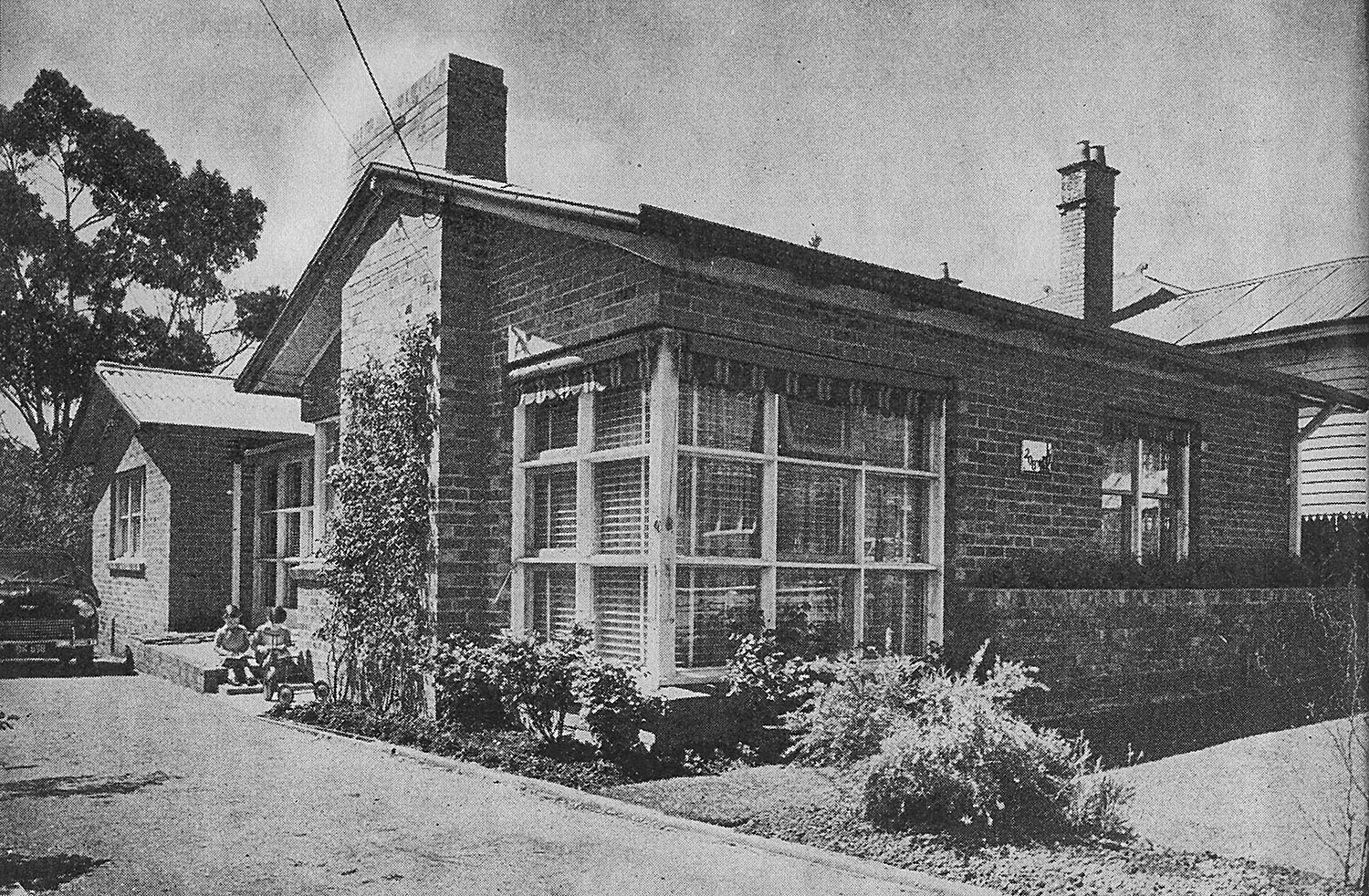
Henderson residence exterior

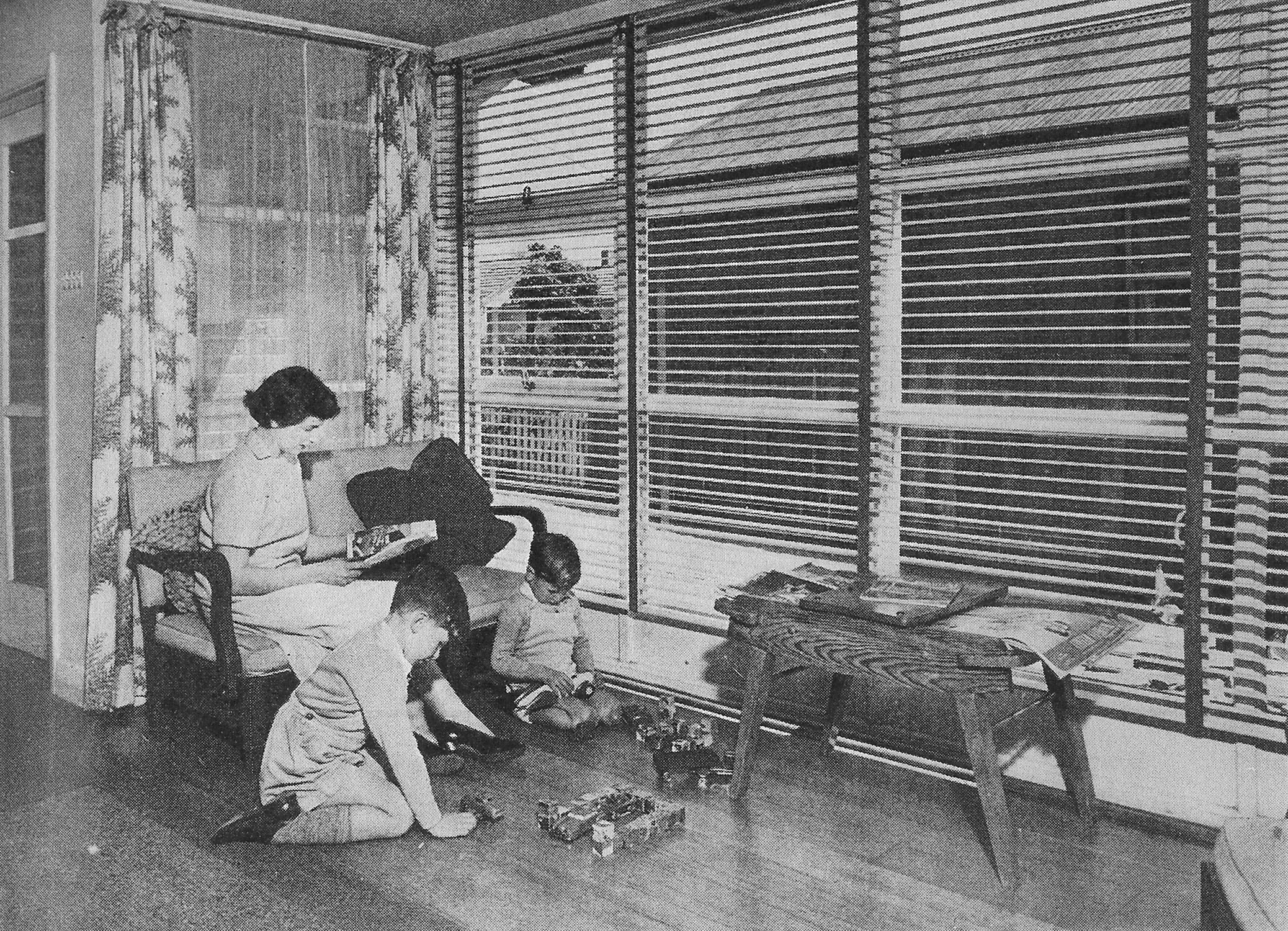
Henderson residence interior

This Ballarat residence is described as, ‘contemporary in feeling without any particularly bold features... well adapted for modern living’. The Henderson’s appear to have valued the role of an architect in the design of their house. This single storey brick residence was orientated on a narrow block for winter solar access. The front façade contains a window that wraps around the corner, and the slight angle of the plan begins to reveal the main entrance through the terrace. The gallery/sun-room that faces the terrace forms the hub of the house. The interior colours are stated to be soft pastels, however the journal speaks of the owners’ desire to experiment with bolder colours.

==== Jacobson residence, Brighton ====
This Brighton residence has a very similar plan to the earlier Henderson residence with a central terrace, entrance and sunroom. Designed for an average-sized allotment this house was described as possessing a ‘remarkable degree of comfort, spaciousness and beauty’ with garden spaces for outdoor living. In this residence Muir and Shepherd used a change in level to differentiate between lounge and dining spaces. The transition between outside and inside was also more expressed. This design included considerably more built-in furniture and fittings than the previous residence.

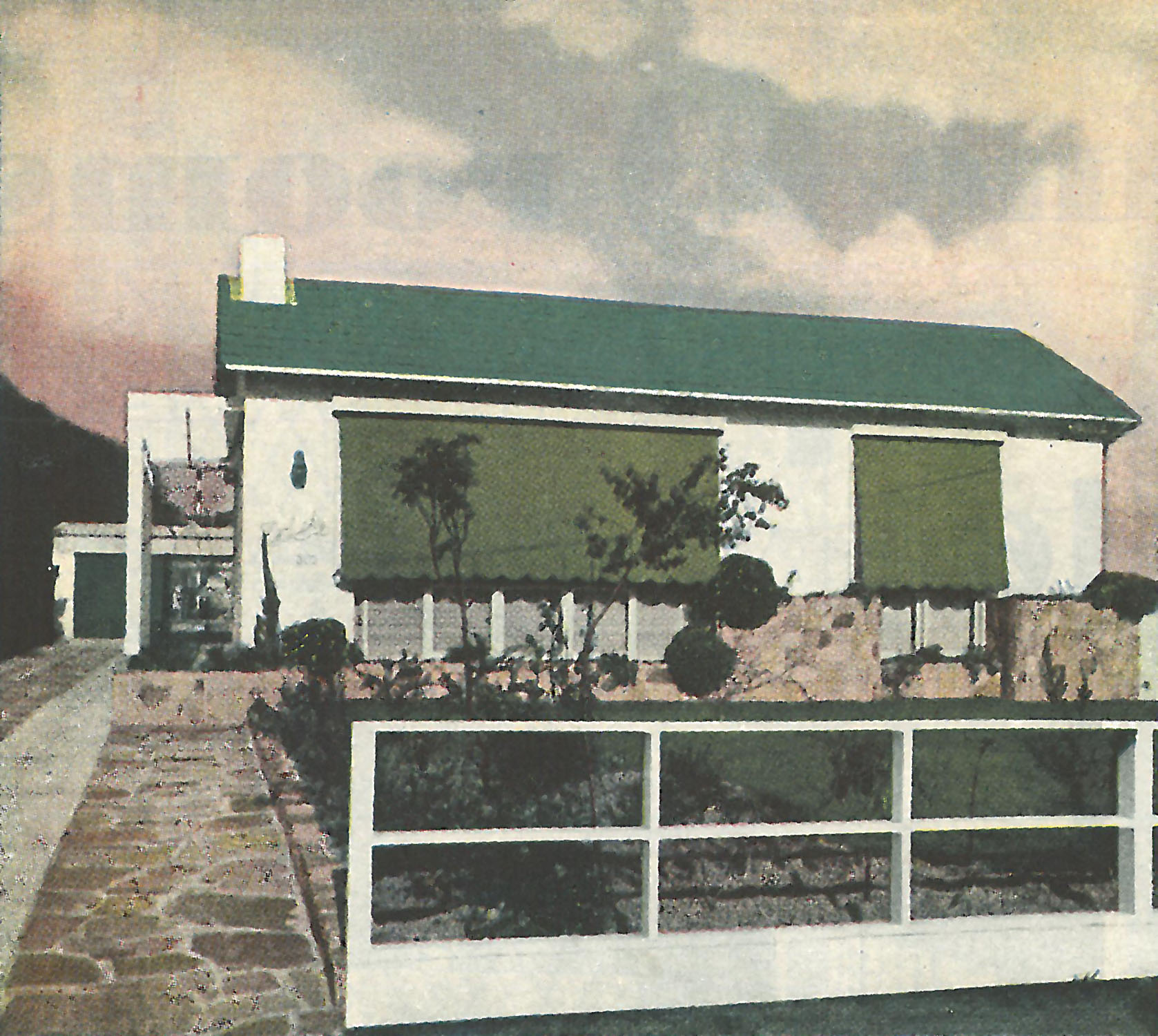
Exterior, 1953

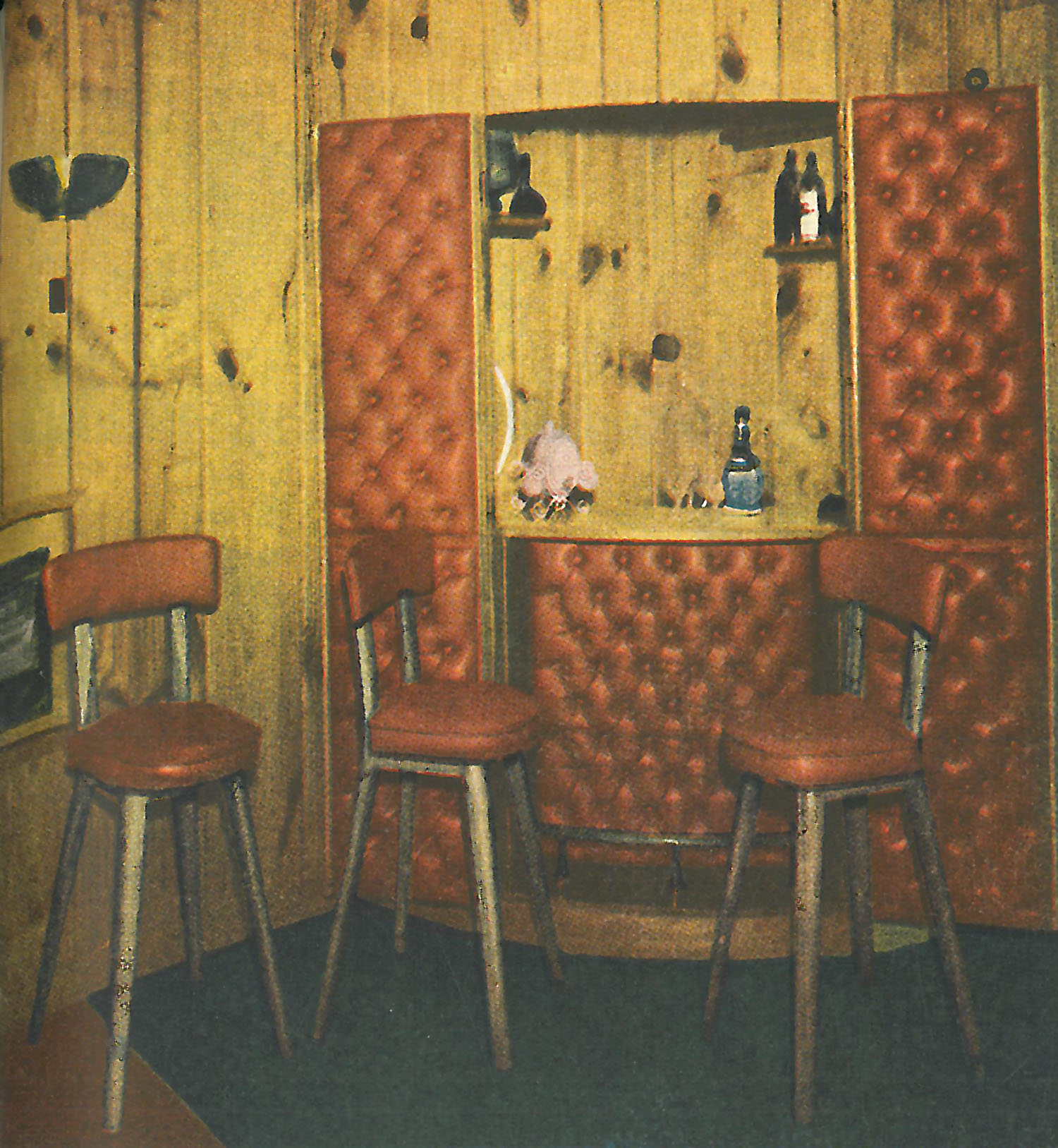
Interior, 1953

==== Fraser residence, Balwyn North ====
This Balwyn North residence was described as a ‘modified contemporary home... which combines the good ideas in modern architecture with the softer finish of the traditional’. The overall form reflects the past colonial Australian homestead with gabled roof and long, broad and low verandas. This dwelling also presents a central entry into the key living spaces and a sunroom. The north façade that faces the street is completely glazed with floor to ceiling sliding glass panels that overlook the stone terrace from the living room. The plan is modern in form with living spaces moving toward an open plan style, and more built in furniture.

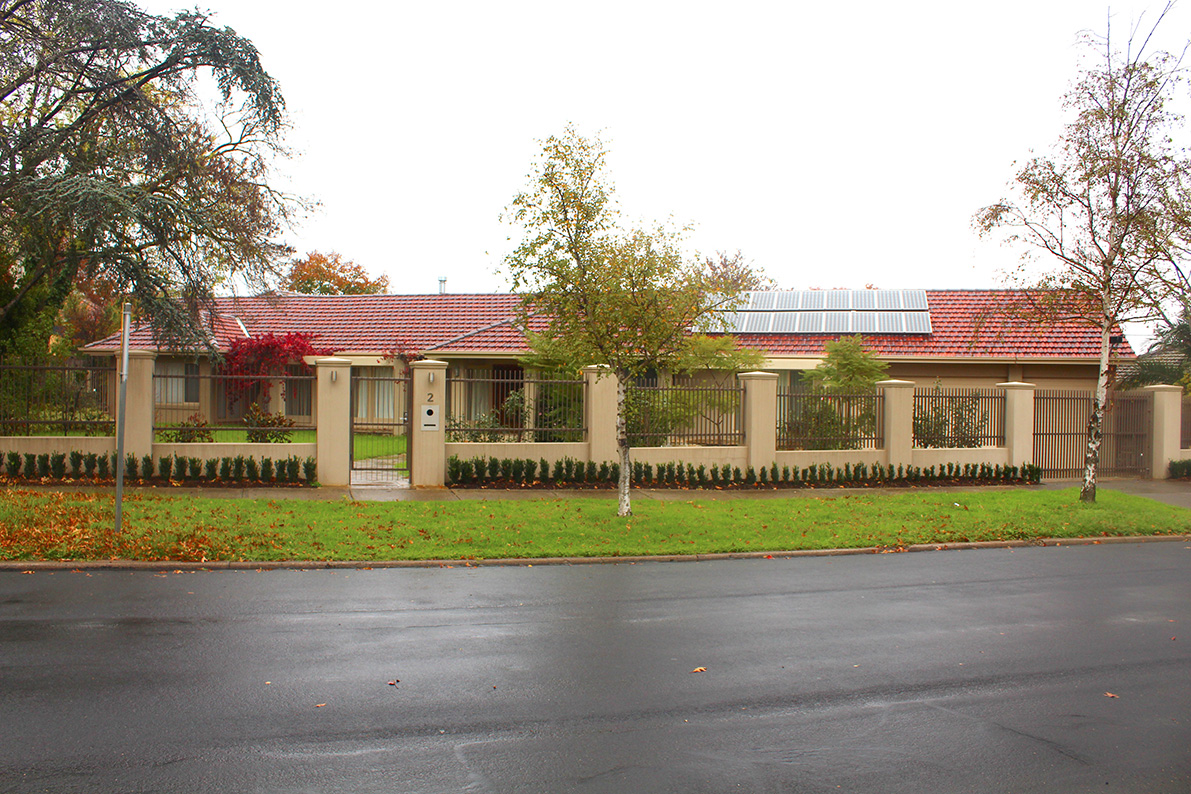
Exterior, 2014

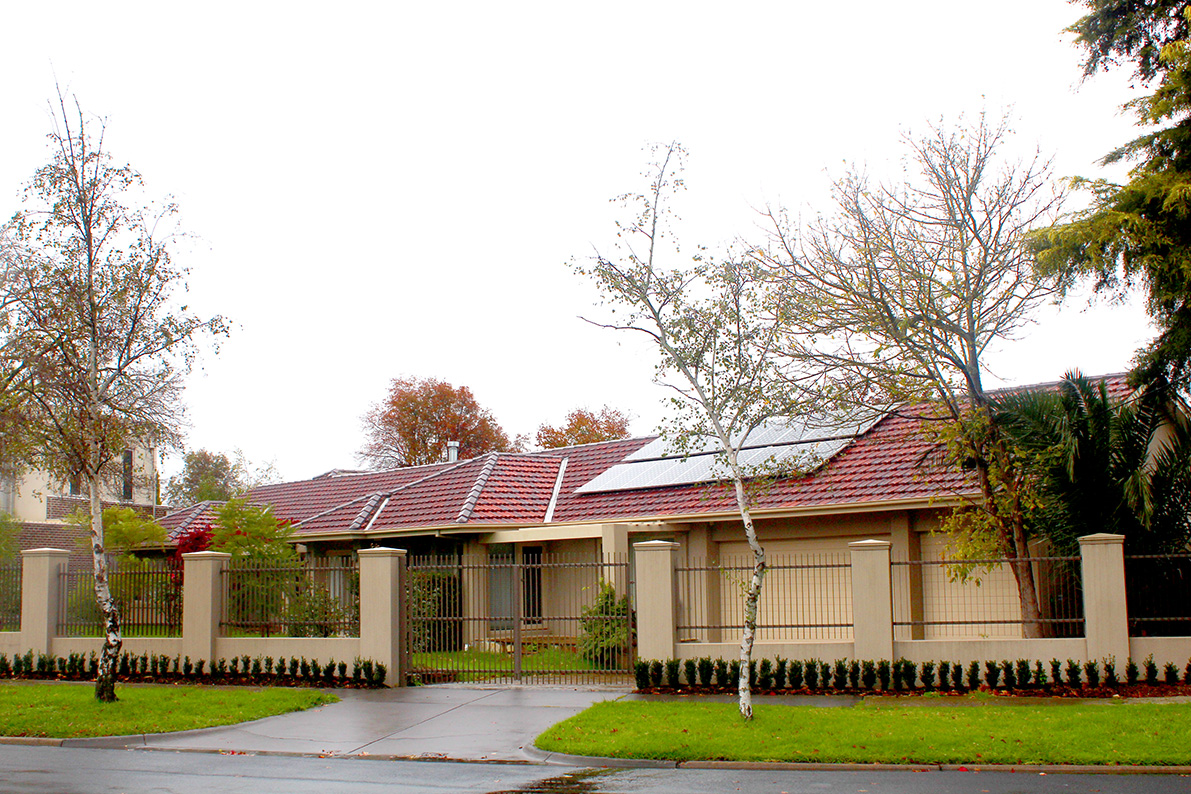
Exterior, 2014

Floor plan

=== Non-residential designs ===
The Funeral Parlour for WG Apps & Sons in St Kilda, now demolished, was the first purpose built post-war funeral building in Victoria. The building, designed in 1953, was minimalist in form made from cream brick with simple white pilotis.
