= York Theatre Royal =

Listed building in York, England

- Front facade of York Theatre Royal, July 2026

General information
- Location: St Leonard's Place, York, England
- Coordinates: 53°57′43″N 1°05′07″W
- Completed: 1744
- Renovated: 1879–80 (rebuilt); 1901–02 (interior remodelled); 1967 (extended); Late 20th century (refurbished)
- Owner: York Citizens' Theatre Trust

Design and construction
- Architects: George Styan (1879); F. A. Tugwell (1902); Patrick Gwynne and R. A. Sefton (1967)
- Designations

Listed Building – Grade II*
- Official name: Theatre Royal and undercroft
- Designated: 14 June 1954
- Reference no.: 1256767

Other information
- Seating capacity: 750

Website
- yorktheatreroyal.co.uk

York Theatre Royal is a theatre on St Leonard's Place, in York, England, which dates back to 1744. The theatre currently seats 750 people. Whilst the theatre is traditionally a proscenium theatre, it was reconfigured for a season in 2011 to offer productions in-the-round. The theatre puts on many of its own productions, as well as hosting touring companies, one of which is Pilot Theatre, a national touring company which often co-produces its work with the theatre. Additionally the main stage and studio are regularly used by local amateur dramatic and operatic societies. York Theatre Royal was one of the co-producers of the historic York Mystery Plays 2012 which were staged in York Museum Gardens between 2–27 August. The theatre reopened on 22 April 2016 following a £6 million redevelopment, with a new roof, an extended and re-modelled front of house area, a refurbished and redecorated main auditorium and with major improvements to access and environmental impact.

== History ==
York Theatre Royal was built in 1744 on, and among, the site of the medieval St Leonard's Hospital. Parts of the old hospital can still be seen in the modern building, including archways and walls. Under the stage lies a well, which is believed to be dated from the Roman era of York's history. The 1744 theatre replaced a theatre in Minster Yard, built by Thomas Keregan, with the encouragement of the city corporation, in 1734. Twenty five years after its construction, in 1769, Tate Wilkinson paid £500 for a royal patent, which was granted by the Theatres (York and Hull) Act 1769 (9 Geo. 3. c. 17) and accordingly it was renamed the Theatre Royal. Wilkinson ran a company that included theatres in Hull, Leeds, Pontefract, Wakefield and other Yorkshire towns. His company was reckoned to be the leading provincial company, and he attracted many of the finest actors of the period, including John Philip Kemble and his sister Sarah Siddons, Dorothea Jordan and Elizabeth Farren, to act in York.

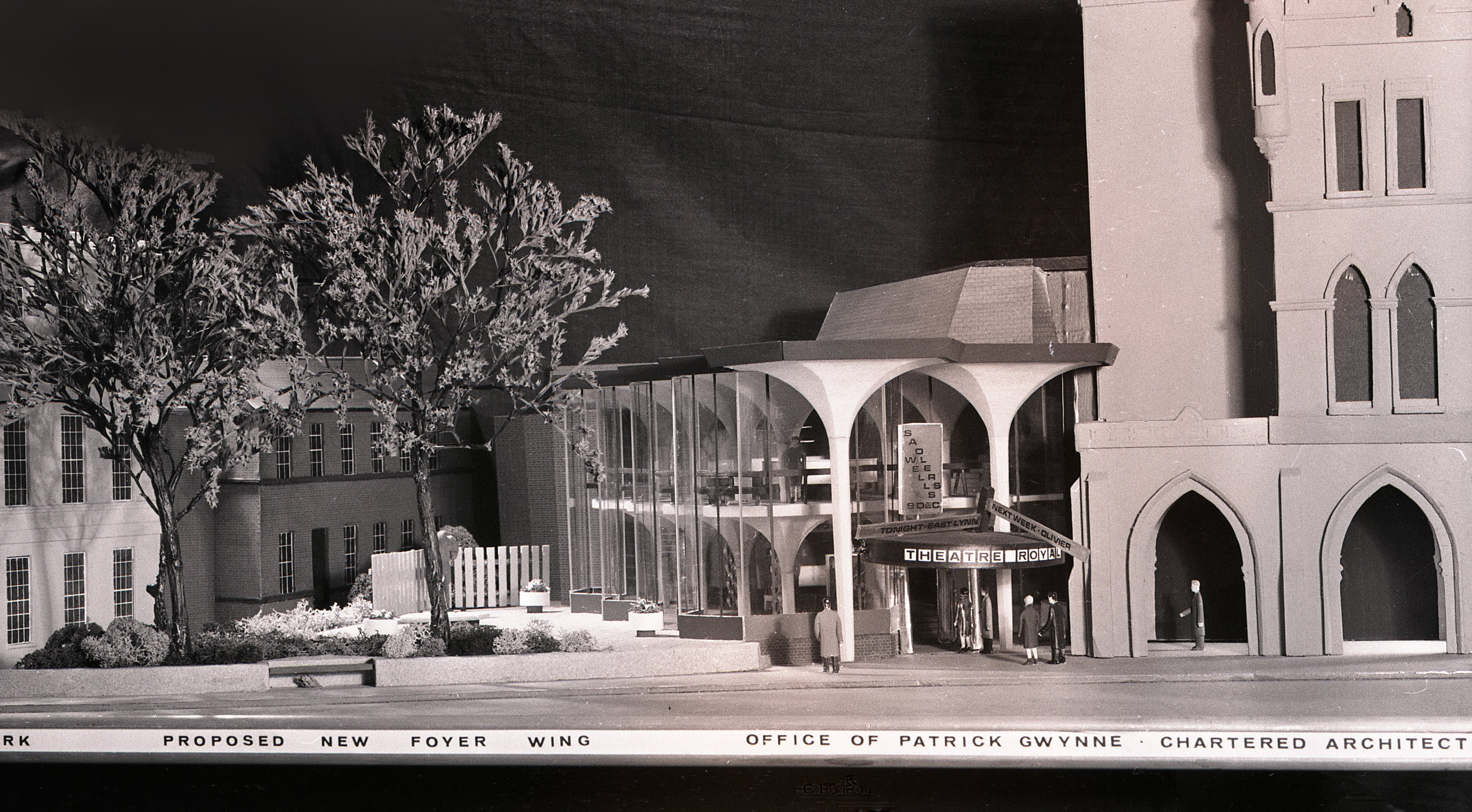
Original scale model of the new foyer at York Theatre Royal by Patrick Gwynne, 1967

Since Wilkinson's time the theatre has undergone several renovations and upgrades. In the late 1800s, the theatre was refurbished into the Victorian style, including, in 1879, a new Gothic Revival frontage, which is decorated with carved heads representing Elizabeth I and characters from Shakespeare's plays. In 1902, architect F. A. Tugwell of Scarborough redesigned the theatre interior. The latest major redevelopment was an extensive renovation of the theatre, with a new modernist foyer (architect: Patrick Gwynne), in 1967.

The theatre has been designated a Grade II* listed building by Historic England.

The theatre was forced to close to the public during the lockdowns brought about by COVID-19. The theatre building was closed between March 2020 and May 2022. During this time, the theatre staff made scrubs for the NHS, created a pop-up outdoor theatre adjacent to the building and performed a 'Travelling Pantomime' in 14 different neighbourhoods of the city. The building re-opened on 17 May 2022 for 'The Love Season', a season of love stories featuring Ralph Fiennes, Julie Hesmondhalgh and New Earth Theatre among many others.

In 2022, the theatre welcomed the Kyiv City Ballet to the UK for the first time, in order to raise funds for UNICEF's work in Ukraine.

== Pantomime ==
The theatre produced its first pantomime in 1862 with a production of The Sleeping Beauty.

The theatre's annual pantomime was for more than 30 years written and directed by Berwick Kaler, who also starred in the show. Kaler retired from playing the dame in 2019. Due to an ongoing fall in ticket sales, the Theatre Royal announced that the pantomime for 2020 was going to be a 'reboot', and would move away from the Kaler-era pantomimes with a new writer and director.

In December 2020, the theatre performed 'The Travelling Pantomime', a tour of a small-scale pantomime to 14 different neighbourhoods in York.

== See also ==
- Grade II* listed buildings in the City of York
- Listed buildings in York (within the city walls, northern part)
- Theatre Royal (disambiguation)
