= Patrick Gwynne =

British modernist architect (1913–2003)

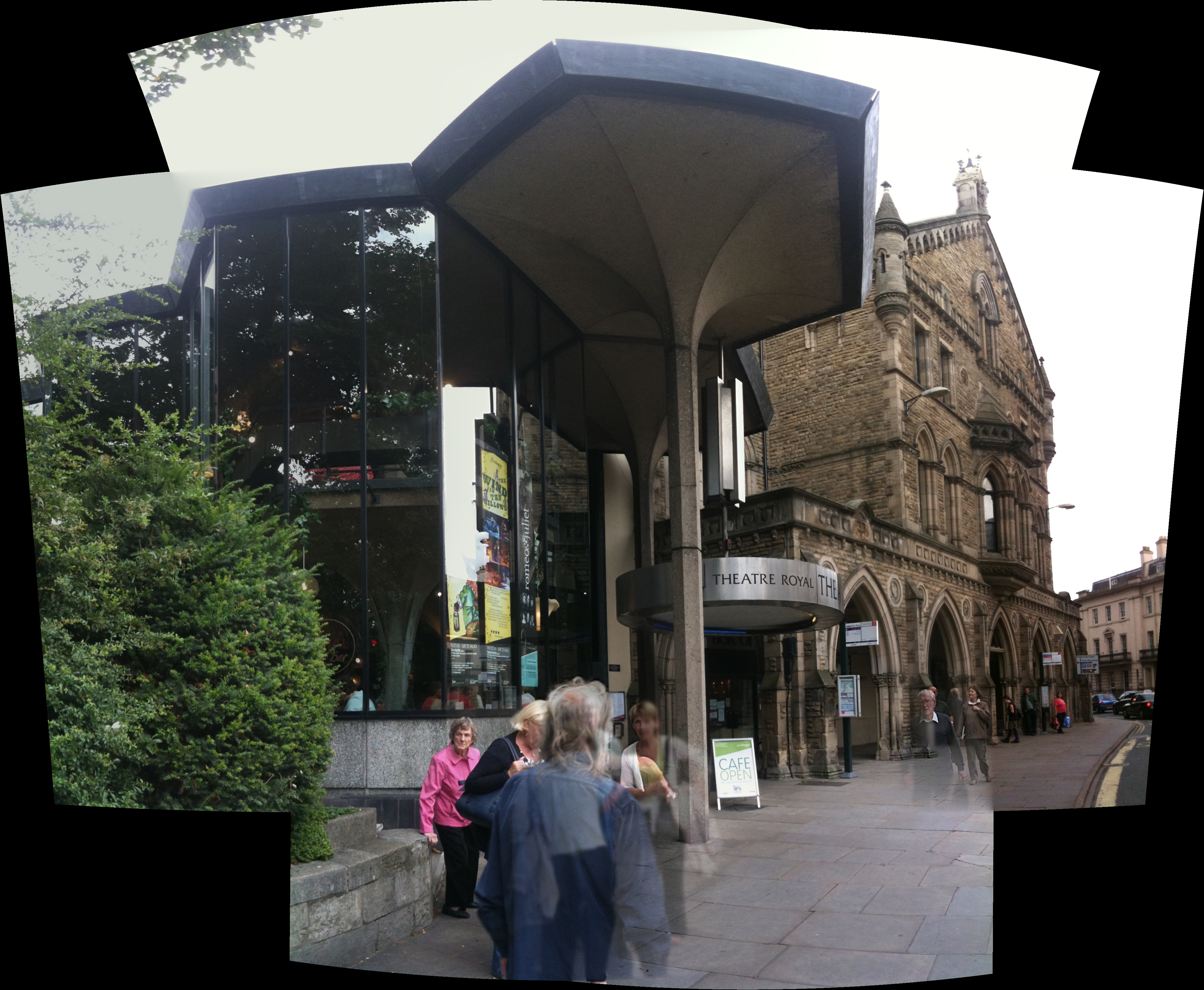
York Theatre Royal, showing a distinctive and characteristic modernist addition by Gwynne, 1967

Alban Patrick Gwynne (24 March 1913 – 3 May 2003) was a British modernist architect with Welsh roots, best known for designing and building The Homewood, which he left to the National Trust in 2003.

== Early life and work ==
Gwynne was born in Portchester, Hampshire, in 1913 to naval Commander Alban Gwynne and his wife, Ruby Bond. They also had a daughter, Noreen Gwenedd "Babs" Gwynne.

He attended Harrow School , where he first connected with modernist architecture on a school sketching excursion near Amersham in Buckinghamshire, where he saw Amyas Connell's "High and Over", the first modern movement house in Britain.

His father planned for him to be an accountant, but since Gwynne wanted to be an architect, secured articles (indentured training) for him with Ernest Coleridge, a former assistant to Sir Edwin Lutyens. On completion, Gwynne met Wells Coates, founder of the Modern Architecture Research Group. Gwynne immediately redesigned a Victorian house in Notting Hill Gate, adding a private theatre and foyer in an advanced modernist manner. The theatre still exists as part of the Estonian House. Gwynne then worked for Coates while designing a new house for his parents. This was the European-influenced dwelling named "The Homewood", built in 1938 on another part of an 8-acre (3.2 ha) estate, to replace the rambling Victorian house in Esher, Surrey. The family used profits from the sale of their family's Welsh estate “Mynachty” – located in Aberaeron. (This is an early nineteenth-century planned town in Wales by his ancestor Colonel Alban Thomas Jones Gwynne. The sale paid for the new building, which cost £10,000, an immense sum for those days.

Coates advised on technical matters, and Denys Lasdun, another assistant to Coates, designed the elliptical terrace pool. Gwynne and Denys Lasdun became friends while working at Wells Coates's office. Gwynne claimed to have contributed a crucial design move that unlocked the rest of Lasdun's design for the Royal College of Physicians building, placing it end-on to Regent's Park. Lasdun returned the compliment by designing The Homewood's pool.

== Career ==
As an architect, Gwynne specialized in houses. His designs have a collective resemblance in their ingenious adaptation to site and prospect, their logical but often dramatic internal planning, and their willingness to use curved forms on plan. Gwynne also grew a reputation for restaurant design.

=== Houses ===
For his private houses, Gwynne developed a close-knit set of clients that included his builder, Leslie Bilsby, for whom he designed three houses, and his quantity surveyor, Kenneth Monk. These houses mark the height of 1960s life style, many designed as a series of connecting rooms that could be thrown together for parties, and with built-in dressers and drinks cabinets. Televisions and gramophones were cleverly concealed, and in one house were hinged within the wall to serve different rooms.

Throughout the 1950s and 1960s, Gwynne designed a number of houses in Hampstead and Blackheath in London, and in Surrey, Oxfordshire and Dorset, many of which have been Grade II listed.

==== The Homewood (1938–39) ====
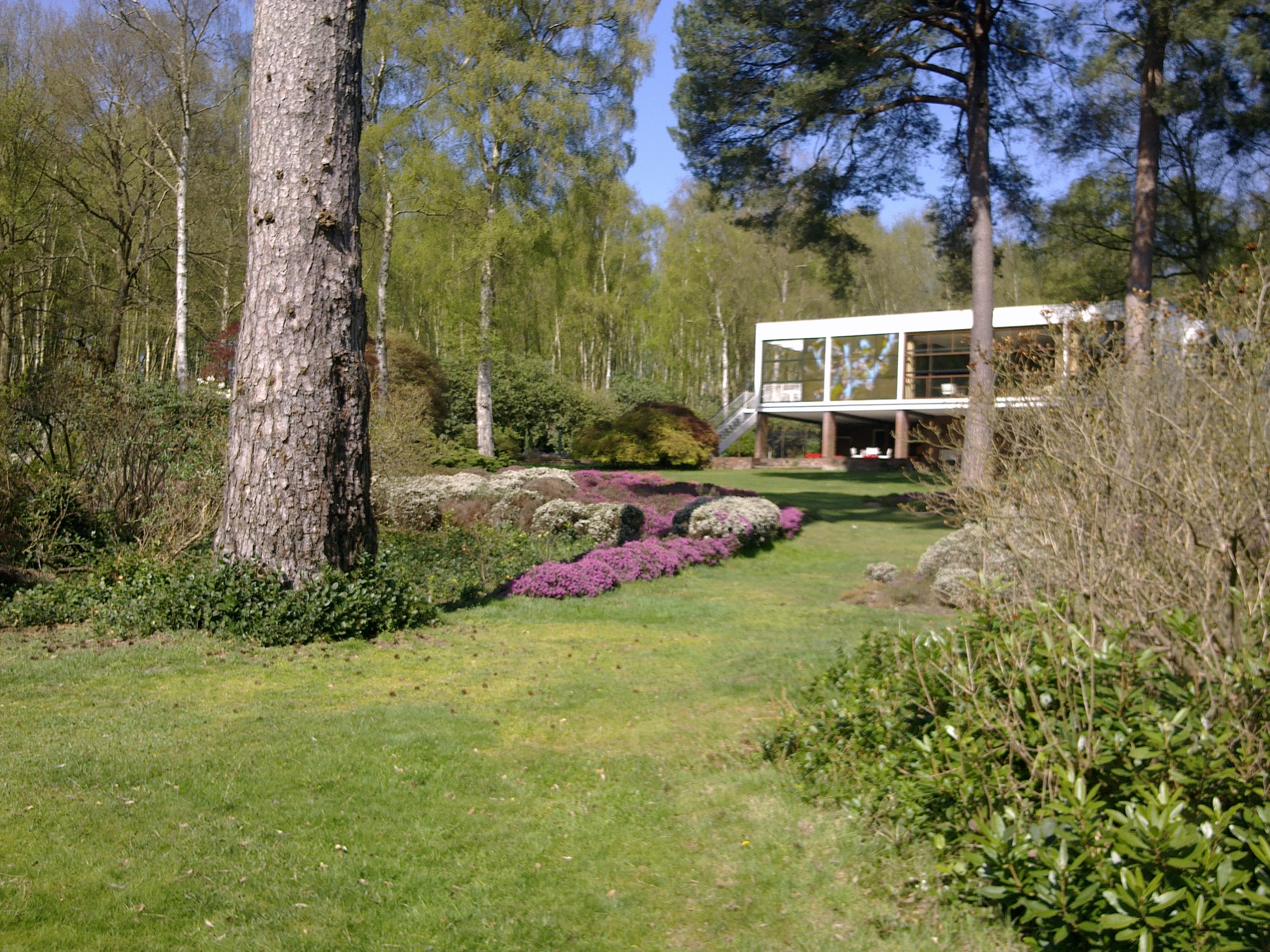
Gwynne's "Homewood" and garden, completed in 1938

Building The Homewood when he was just 24, Gwynne acknowledged his sources as Le Corbusier's Villa Savoye and Ludwig Mies van der Rohe's Tugendhat House. Despite his enthusiasm for flat surfaces, man-made materials and rigorous lack of ornament, Gwynne produced a remarkably mature design at a young age, designing all the built-in furniture, light fittings and innovations such as en-suites and window mechanisms.

The main accommodation is raised on piloti to accommodate parking for the family's many cars. There is one large living room with a dining area screened at one end. The five bedrooms are in a separate wing, and the servants' quarters accommodate four servants.

His parents had "one good year" in the house, but died early in the Second World War, while Gwynne was serving in the Royal Air Force constructing airfields. War broke out just after the family home was finished. Commander Gwynne resumed his naval duties, Patrick joined the RAF, and his sister, Babs, went to the Wrens. Patrick's mother, Ruby, let the house, but died along with her husband in 1942. After the war, Patrick returned along with his sister, who soon married and left. His long-term companion, pianist Harry Rand, had an adjoining bedroom, identical to Gwynne's, with a single bed and washbasin concealed behind sliding panels. He carried on a highly successful architectural business from the house that he was to live in for about 60 years.

In 1946, he restored the house for himself, remodeling the kitchen to the servant-less times (though he continued to be looked after by housekeeper friends). His parents' bedroom was added to his office space. Murals by Peter Thompson and Stephan Knapp, and furniture to Gwynne's own design, were added over the years. He continually modified the house over time so that it represents design from the 1930s and 1950s to the 1970s.

The building served as Gwynne's primary residence, his office, and a showcase of his work. It is one of the few modernist houses that features both continuous occupancy and its original contents.

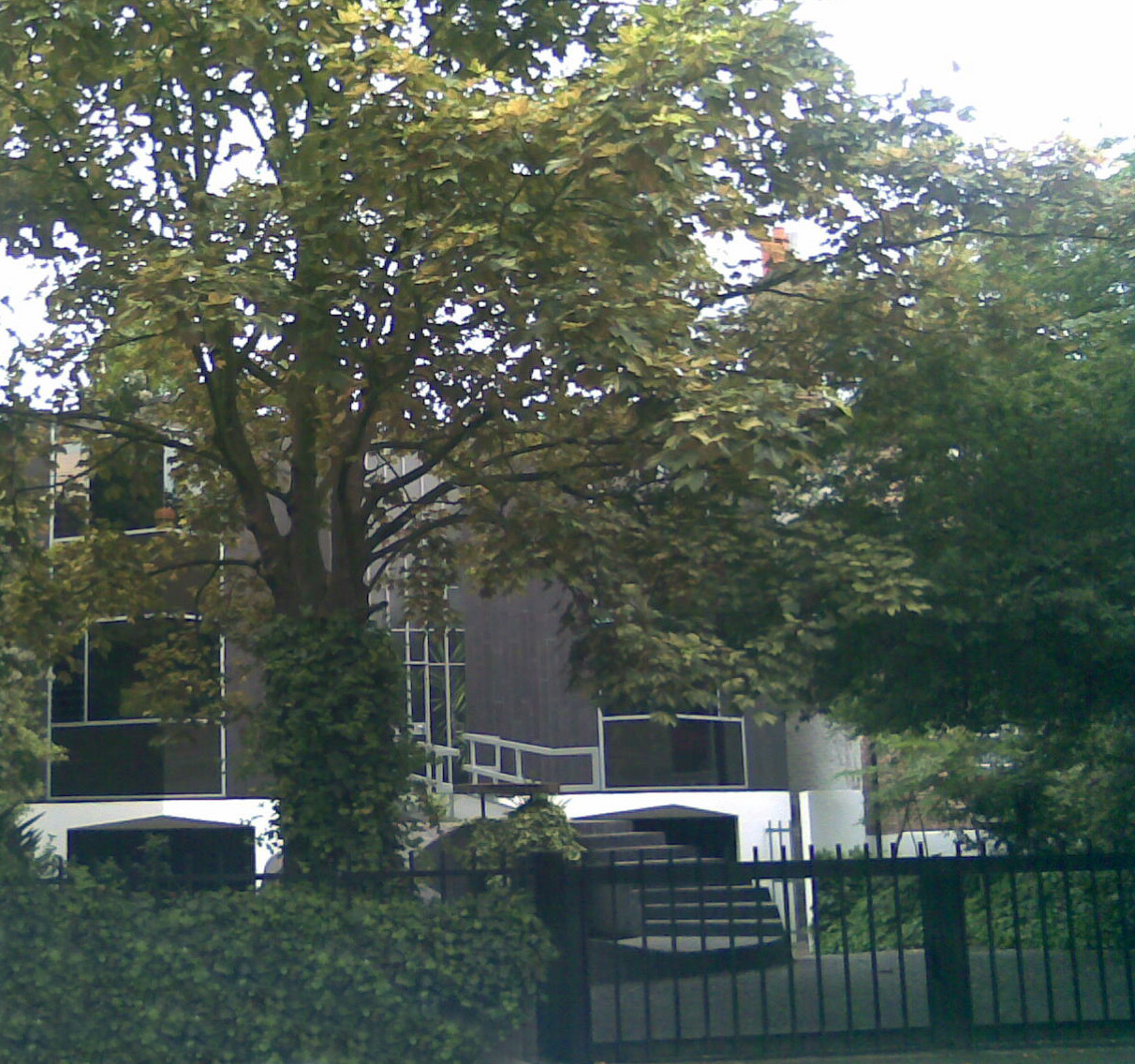
House in Blackheath Park, designed by Gwynne, one of two designs he executed for Leslie Bilsby, a pioneer builder of modernist housing schemes.

==== Vista Point (1970) ====
In the late 1960s, Gwynne's quantity surveyor, Ken Monk, asked him to design a summer house in West Sussex on a strip of land overlooking the Channel. This house was Vista Point, completed in 1970, and designed to take full advantage of the site.

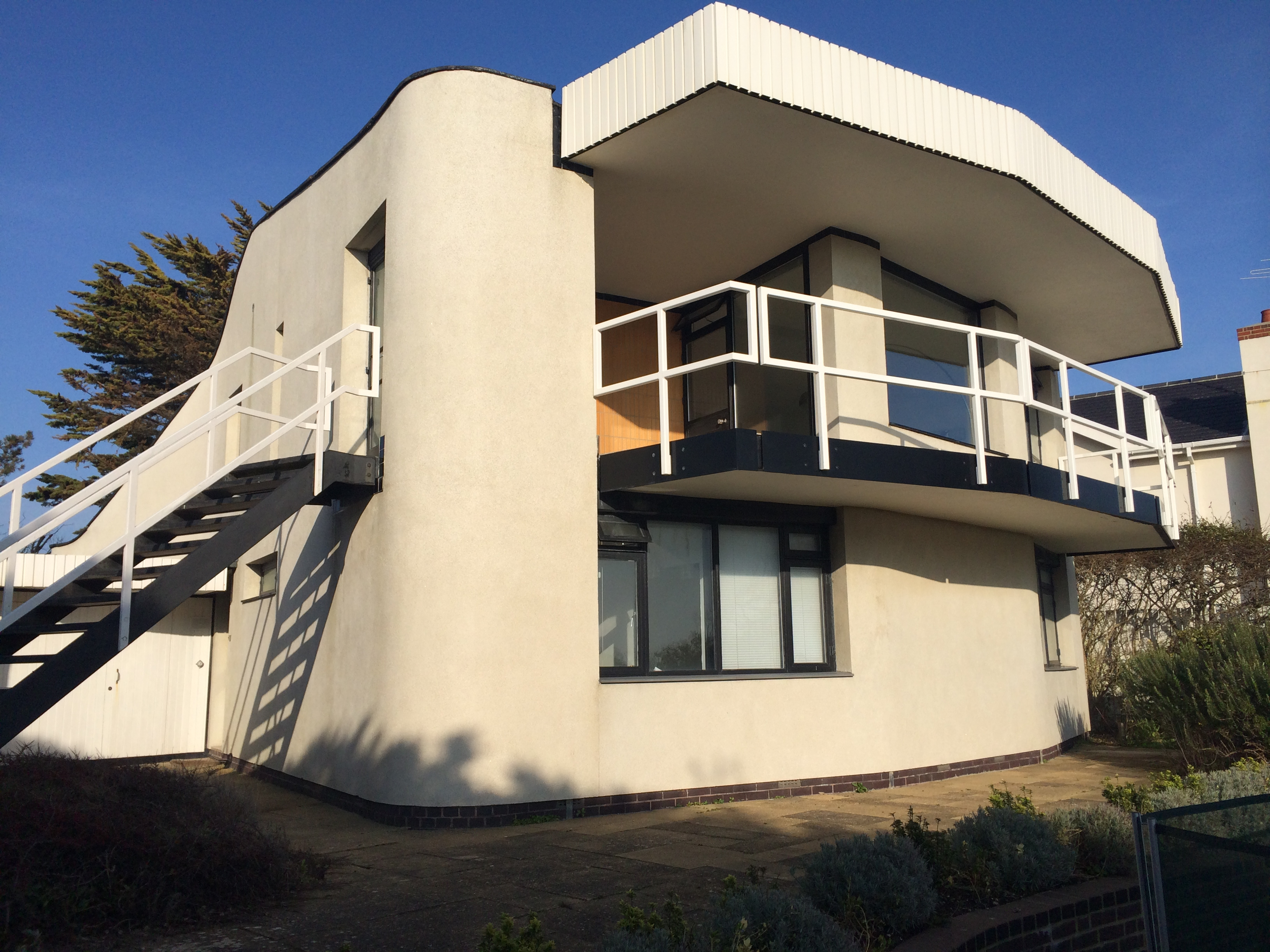
External picture of Vista Point on the coast in West Sussex. Designed by Gwynne for his quantity surveyor Ken Monk in 1969.

Gwynne designed Vista Point to entirely overlook the garden. The house has a few side windows. Bingham writes: “The house is planned with an hourglass shape, narrowing to a 'waistline' for the staircase core. The roof echoes the undulating walls, sliding from the front to the rear like a giant wave. Gwynne chose building materials, many of them man-made, to withstand the seafront climate.”

He did not complete any major buildings after the end of the 1970s, working more as an advisor on restorations and extensions.

==== Grovewood (1968) ====
Grovewood was a house designed by Gwynne situated on the Wentworth Estate, Virginia Water, Surrey. It was designed for a chemical engineer and his family and had a floor plan of 1900 square feet, in a tri-form configuration consisting of a central area with three uniform arms. It incorporated several features seen in The Homewood, including movable room dividers, floor-to-ceiling glazing, and strategically placed narrow windows. It was sold in 1982 and then again in 1994, when it was subsequently demolished and redeveloped.

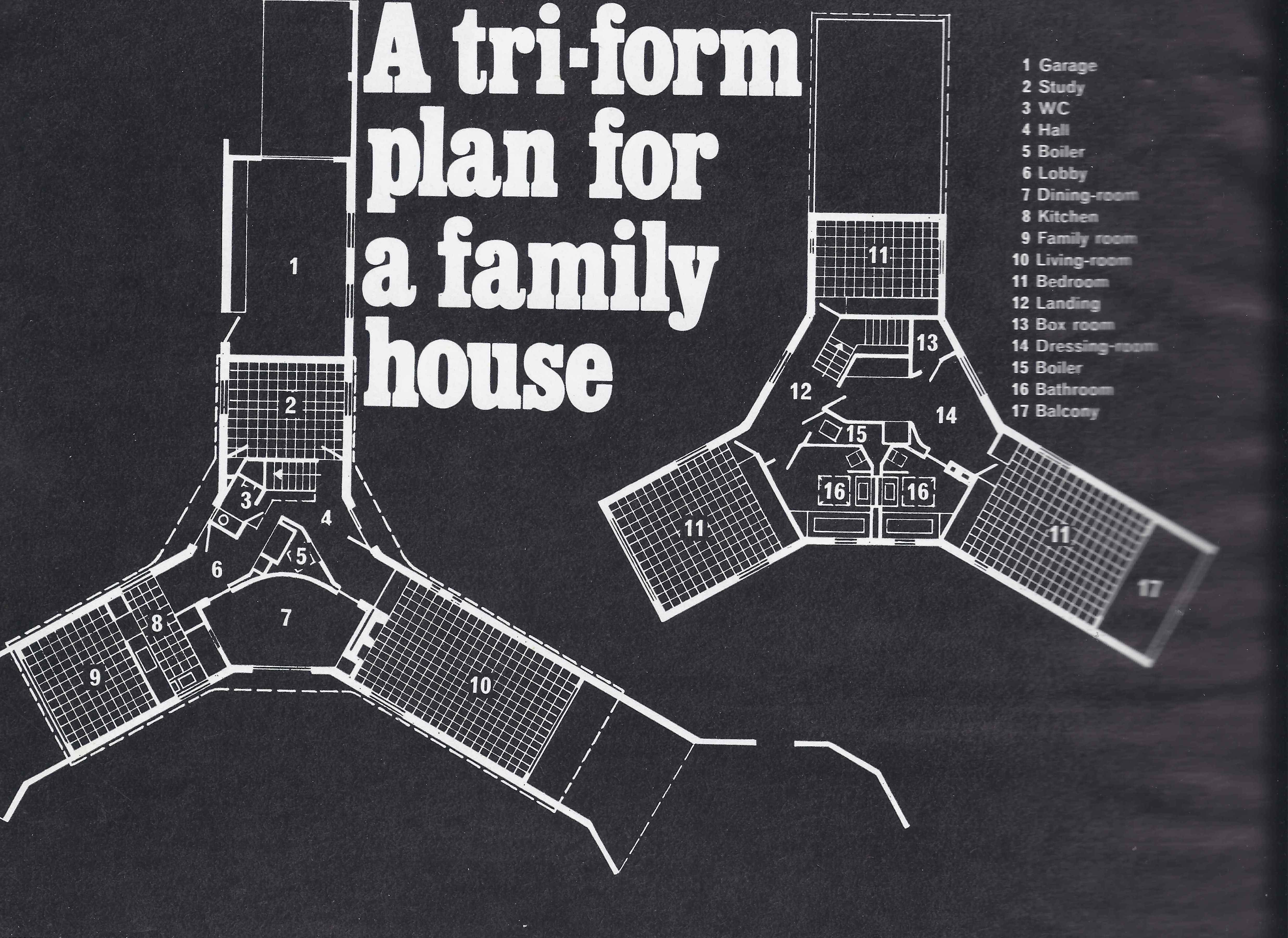
Grovewood, a tri-form design by Gwynne

The property was featured in House and Garden magazine, March 1968.

=== Restaurants ===
His entry in the restaurant competition at the Festival of Britain led to a commission for the Crescent Restaurant at Battersea Park. It was a real tent, with Regency-style bows to support the structure, painted in rainbow colors.

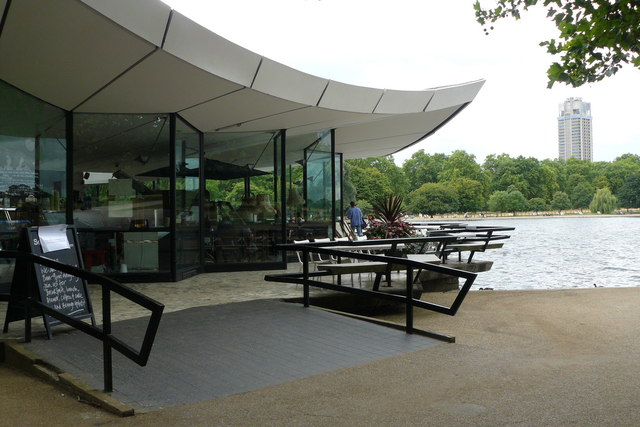
The Dell Restaurant

Through this, he met Charles Forte, for whom he went on in 1964 to design the Serpentine Restaurant in Hyde Park, a series of mushroom structures inspired by umbrellas, which he thought appropriate in a park. It was demolished in 1990, but his smaller Dell Restaurant, built in 1965, at the other end of the park, survives, and the terrazzo terrace and built-in seating overlooking the Serpentine show his signature touches.

The Serpentine Restaurant led to a commission for a restaurant addition to the Theatre Royal at York, where the mushroom structure was repeated around a sweeping, freestanding staircase.

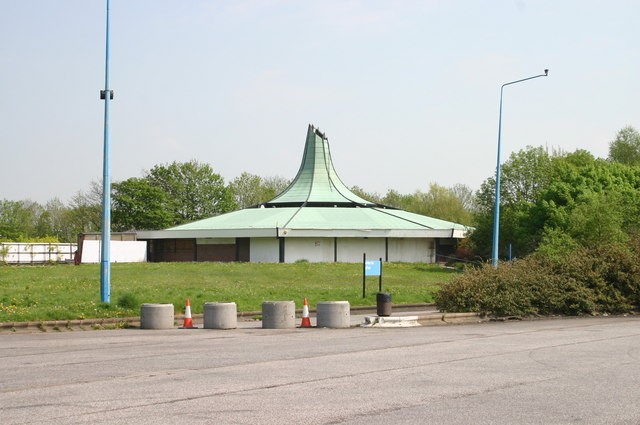
Burtonwood Services Building

He designed two motorway service stations for Motorchef. Burtonwood on the M62 was built in 1974, with a pair of dramatic roof forms swooping up like a swirl of whipped cream.

== Materials and design ==
As well as building design, Gwynne also advised on furnishings and landscaping to create a complete ensemble. His use of plastic finishes included a special grass paper, which was also his own product. "People seem to recognize my work as being from my hand despite the strong influence of client and site", he wrote in 1984.

His later houses became more curvilinear, with rounded corners; one in Blackheath (22 Park Gate, designed for Leslie Bilsby) is designed as a series of linked pentagons, a space-age capsule that references the proportions of neighboring Regency buildings.

His clients included the actors Jack Hawkins, for whom Gwynne designed a house in Bournemouth for his parents-in-law in 1959, and Laurence Harvey, who commissioned a house in Hampstead, the pianist Clifford Curzon, and Sir Charles Forte. The largest was built at Witley Park, Godalming, Surrey, for Gerald Bentall in 1962.

Gwynne retained the European quality of 1930s modernism in his careful choice of materials, delight in gadgets, and neo-Baroque sensibility.

His obituary in The Times notes his genius for his residential work "with his faultless sense of placing, innovative plan forms, novel techniques and materials, and meticulous concern for interior arrangement and detail."

== National Trust ==
Following the National Trust's successful campaign to acquire Ernő Goldfinger's house in Willow Road, Hampstead, in 1993, Gwynne offered The Homewood, the last great pre-war modern house with its fittings and grounds intact. Avanti Architects worked with Gwynne to painstakingly restore the house.

Even at the end, despite increasing frailty, Gwynne was still developing designs for a new house in the grounds to create an income for the Trust.
