= The Homewood =

Modernist house in South East England

Coordinates: 51°21′00″N 0°23′19″W

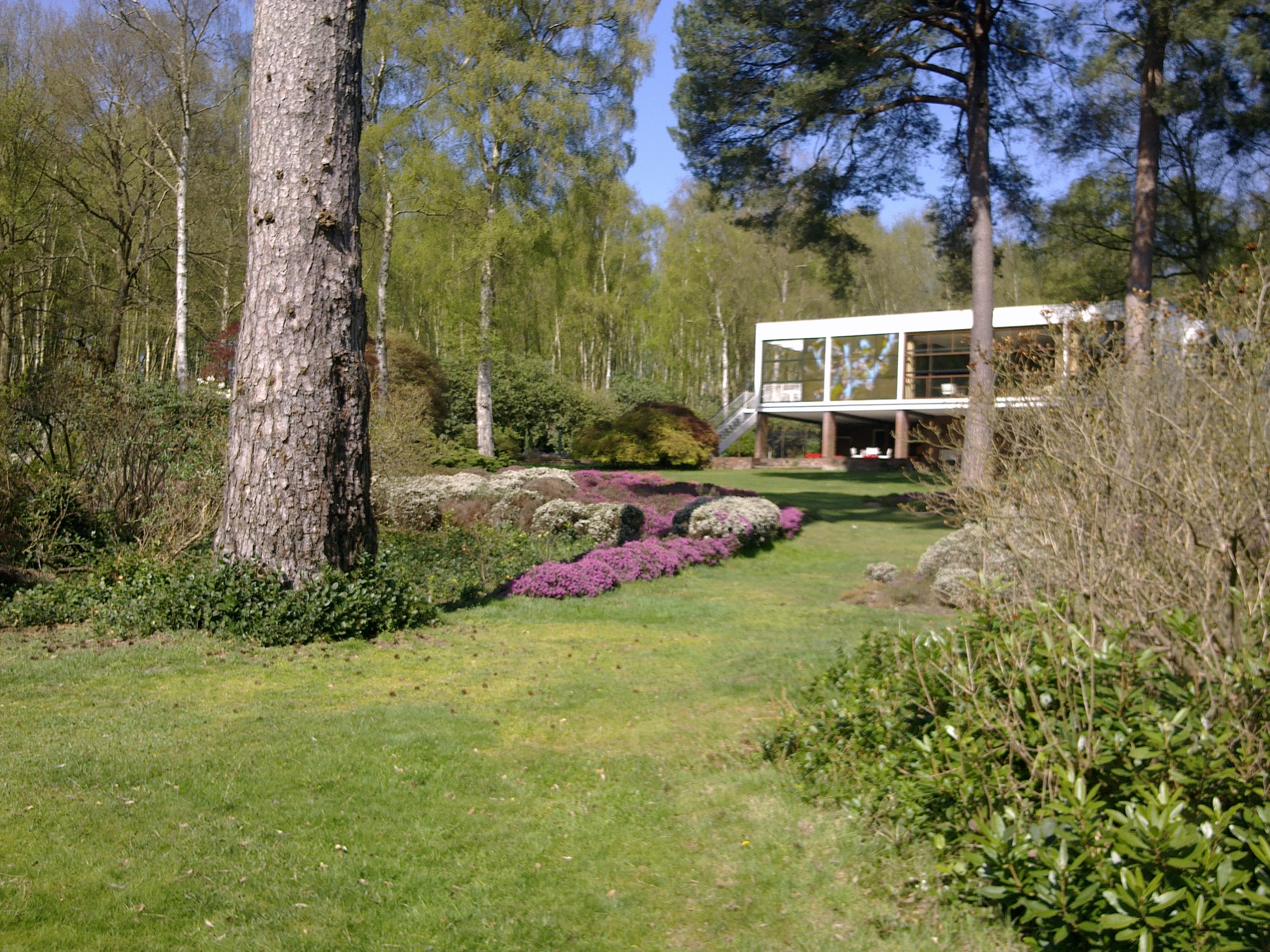
- The living room wing from the garden

- Location within Surrey
- Type: Private house
- Location: Esher, Surrey, England

History
- Built: 1938

Site notes
- Architect: Patrick Gwynne
- Architectural style: Modernist
- Owner: National Trust

Listed Building – Grade II
- Official name: The Homewood
- Designated: 28 January 1971
- Reference no.: 1365884

The Homewood is a modernist house near Esher, Surrey, England. Designed by Patrick Gwynne for his parents, it was completed in 1938. The house became a Grade II-listed building in 1971 and was given by Gwynne to the National Trust in 1999.

== History ==
Alban Gwynne, a commander in the Royal Navy, and his wife, Ruby Gywnne (née Bond), moved to Homewood in Esher, Surrey, in 1914. At first they rented the property, but later purchased it outright. By the mid-1930s, the original Victorian house was in need of repairs and, with noise levels from the adjacent A3 road increasing, the Gwynnes chose to build a replacement dwelling on a new site on the northern part of their land.

The new house, called The Homewood, was designed by Patrick Gwynne, a 24-year-old architect and the son of Alban and Ruby Gwynne. The family sold land that Alban Gwynne had inherited in Aberaeron, Wales, to finance the construction work. Kenneth Powell, a journalist, writes that Gwynne intended the new house "to suit a comfortable upper-middle class life, with plenty of space for entertaining, and also a servants' wing."

Patrick Gwynne began to design The Homewood in 1937, shortly after he had left the practice of Wells Coates, a modernist architect. While employed by Coates, he had worked with Denys Lasdun and Edric Neel, and had been involved in the design of Embassy Court, Hove, and Shipwrights, a private house in Benfleet, Essex.

The construction of the new house designed by Gwynne began in October 1937 and was completed the following year. Coates made suggestions on the design, and also recommended contractors with experience of building modernist houses. The consulting engineers were Felix Samuely and Conrad Hamann. After the house was completed, Coates insisted that he should be given equal, joint credit for the building, although Gwynne maintained that the design was his alone.

The Gwynne family hosted a housewarming party at The Homewood in July 1938, but were only able to live there for about a year. When the Second World War broke out, Alban Gwynne was recalled to the Royal Navy, and Patrick and his sister enlisted in the armed forces. Ruby Gwynne moved to a cottage in the grounds of the property, allowing the house to be let. Among the private tenants who rented The Homewood were Robert Lutyens, son of Edwin Lutyens, and the Ambassador of Chile. Alban and Ruby Gwynne died in 1942, within ten days of each other.

Patrick Gwynne took up residence in The Homewood again in 1945. Initially he lived with his sister, Babs, who on her marriage the following year, moved with her husband to the cottage in the grounds, and later to Essex. Gywnne lived in the house for the next 58 years, also using it as a base for his architectural practice, having converted the master bedroom into an office for his assistants. He repartitioned other rooms in the same wing, to create two larger bedrooms from three smaller ones. In the 1960s, the original walnut panelling in the sitting room was replaced with Indian laurel, and in around 1970, the kitchen was enlarged and refitted. The house became a Grade II-listed building on 28 January 1971.

The National Trust agreed, in principle, to preserve The Homewood and its contents in January 1994. The decision was controversial, as some members of the board observed that the trust already had a large number of houses in its ownership, and others considered that modernist buildings were outside the remit of the organisation. Negotiations with Gwynne lasted until 1999, when The Homewood was formally acquired. The trust began an extensive renovation of the property, overseen by John Allen with Gwynne acting as a consultant. The work included the restoration of the master bedroom to its original appearance and the complete replacement of the flat roof.

Patrick Gwynne died in May 2003 and his ashes were buried in the garden of the Homewood the following March. A condition for the National Trust acquiring the property was that it should be let to a family, and that it should be opened to the public for one day a week, six months of the year. The house was opened for the first time in March 2004.

== Description ==
=== Design overview ===
Villa Savoye, designed by Le Corbusier and completed in 1931

The Homewood was designed in the modernist style by Patrick Gwynne in the late 1930s. Gwynne was influenced by the work of Le Corbusier, a Swiss-French architect and pioneer of modern architecture in the early 20th century, and his design of the Villa Savoye, on the outskirts of Paris, in particular. Neil Bingham, Gwynne's biographer and an architecture historian, recognises the influence of the Villa Savoye in the east side of the bedroom wing of The Homewood, and Kenneth Powell, an architectural critic and historian, writes that Gwynne's design "is a free interpretation of that iconic Corbusier house, an all-white block apparently floating on slender columns." Other influences on The Homewood include Ludwig Mies van der Rohe and Serge Chermayeff.

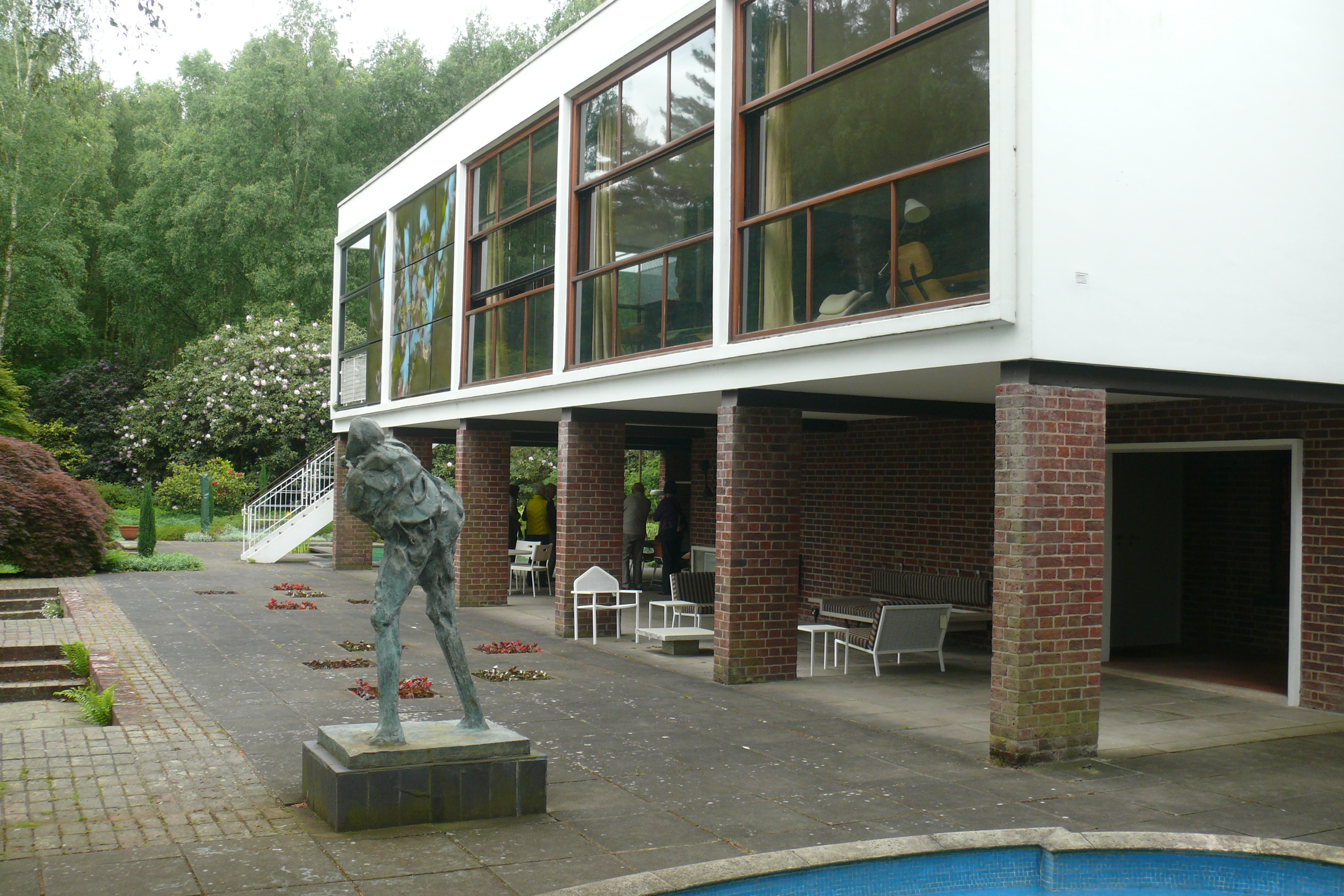
The south-facing principal elevation of The Homewood: The living room is the room on the first floor nearest the camera.

The Homewood was built on an area of higher ground, close to the northern boundary of the Gwynnes's property, allowing the windows of the living room to face south, with views across the garden. The house is built as a two-storey bungalow, with all principal rooms, except the owner's study, on the upper floor. It has two wings, which are connected by the entrance hall and spiral staircase: The longer wing contains the family and guest bedrooms, and the study; the L-shaped wing contains the living and dining room, service facilities such as the kitchen, and staff accommodation.

Lydia Greeves, a writer and architectural historian, notes that although The Homewood is "uncompromisingly modern, the house is based on a classical system of proportions and has a pleasing sense of order and harmony." The internal, reinforced concrete frame is based on a three-dimensional grid pattern with spacings of 1 ft 8 in (0.51 m) in the vertical direction and 4 ft (1.2 m) in the horizontal directions, and allows large expanses of open floor and wall space. The upper floor is supported primarily by piloti (columns), although the walls enclosing the ground floor rooms are of brick. The main concrete superstructure is painted ivory white. Since the water table is only 5 ft (1.5 m) below ground level, the foundations were constructed using vertical piles tied together with horizontal beams. The flat roof was originally covered in teak slats and had curved windbreaks to provide privacy for rooftop sunbathing.

=== Entrance block and living room wing ===
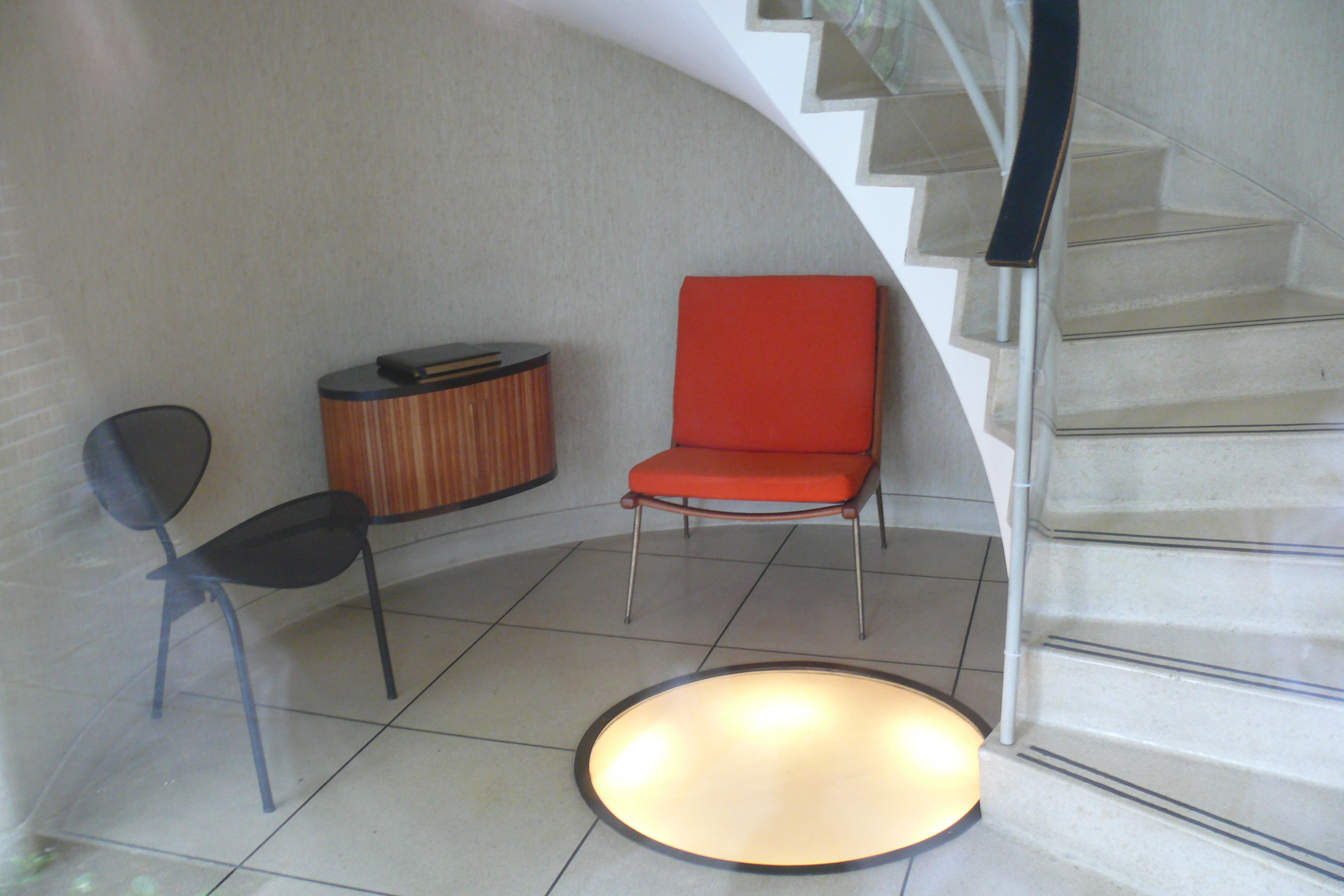
The main entrance hall with the spiral staircase and the uplighter recessed into the floor

The main entrance of The Homewood is accessed from the covered, circular driveway. The front door is set in a glass-block wall, which according to Bingham: "dramatically encases the door in light." The spiral staircase, constructed in concrete with terrazzo surfaces, is lit from below by an uplighter, embedded in the floor, and from above by an antique glass chandelier containing Bristol blue glass. (Note: The glass chandelier on the upper landing of The Homewood previously hung in the Gwynnes's original house.) The upper landing links the two wings of the house and the front- and rear-facing walls are glazed.

Padded, white leather doors lead from the upstairs landing of the entrance block into the living room. Gwynne designed the living room as a flexible open-plan space for entertaining and relaxing, and the furniture can be rearranged to suit different uses in different seasons. The south wall is composed of three multi-panel window units, separated by the concrete framework of the house, which provide a view over the terrace and garden. (Note: Neil Bingham suggests that the large windows forming the south wall of the living room were inspired by a similar windows at 10 Palace Gate, London, an apartment block designed by Wells Coates.) The fireplace, which provides the principal focus in the winter months, was inspired by Mies van der Rohe, and is set in a wall of green marble from Levanto, Italy. The Indian laurel wood panelling on the north wall includes insert shelving and cupboards to store and display items including books, records and a radiogram. The maple wood floor is sprung for dancing, using a rubber underlay.

Much of the furniture in the living room was designed by Gwynne in the 1960s, including the Chinese-style lacquered book table, desk, side table and a long table incorporating a cine film editor. Also by Gwynne, but dating from the late 1930s are the glass-topped occasional table and semi-circular sofa. Items designed by others include two chaises longues by Bruno Mathsson, a Bauhaus chair by Marcel Breuer, and a leather Eames Lounge Chair with matching Ottoman, which had previously belonged to Laurence Harvey. Artworks in the living room include a drawing by Stefan Knapp and a bronze sculpture entitled The Japanese Actor by Oliffe Richmond.

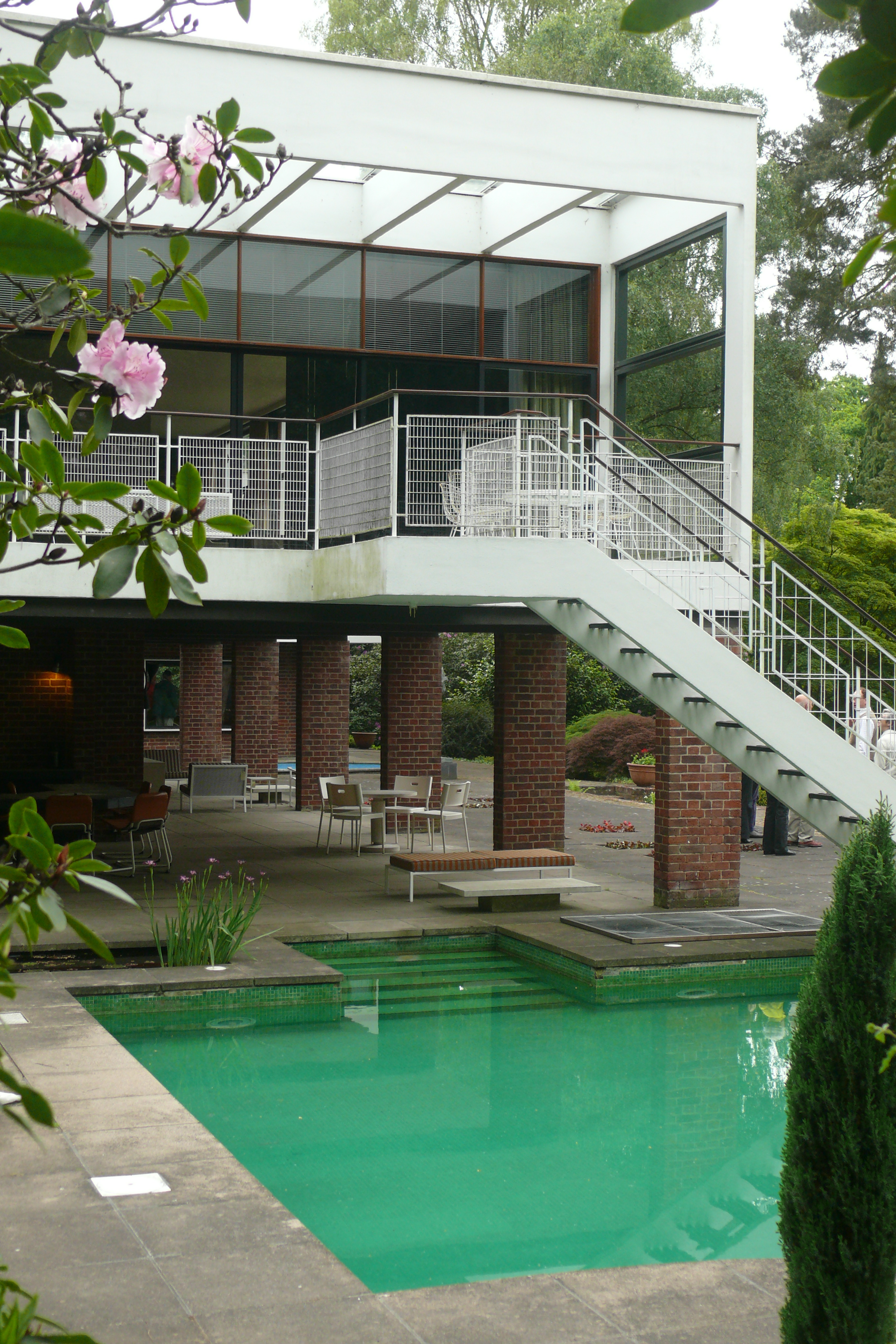
The dining room balcony (above) and swimming pool from the west

The living room is separated from the dining room partly by a folding screen door, with decoration by Peter Thompson, and partly by the fixed wall containing the fireplace. The side of the screen facing the living room is painted with images of bamboo and the other side has images of maize cobs, picked out in gold leaf. In the centre of the dining room is the round dining table, designed by Gwynne in the 1960s. (Note: The round dining table has an aluminium base and glass top. It has a central circular well that incorporates coloured lights and is designed to display decorative objects such as flowers.) The dining chairs, covered in white vinyl, are by Eero Saarinen, and the four portraits of members of the Gwynne family were painted by Mather Brown in around 1810. A serving hatch allows food to be passed directly from the kitchen, and a door provides access to the servants' quarters. Glass double doors on the west side of the dining room lead to the balcony that overlooks the swimming pool.

=== Bedroom wing ===
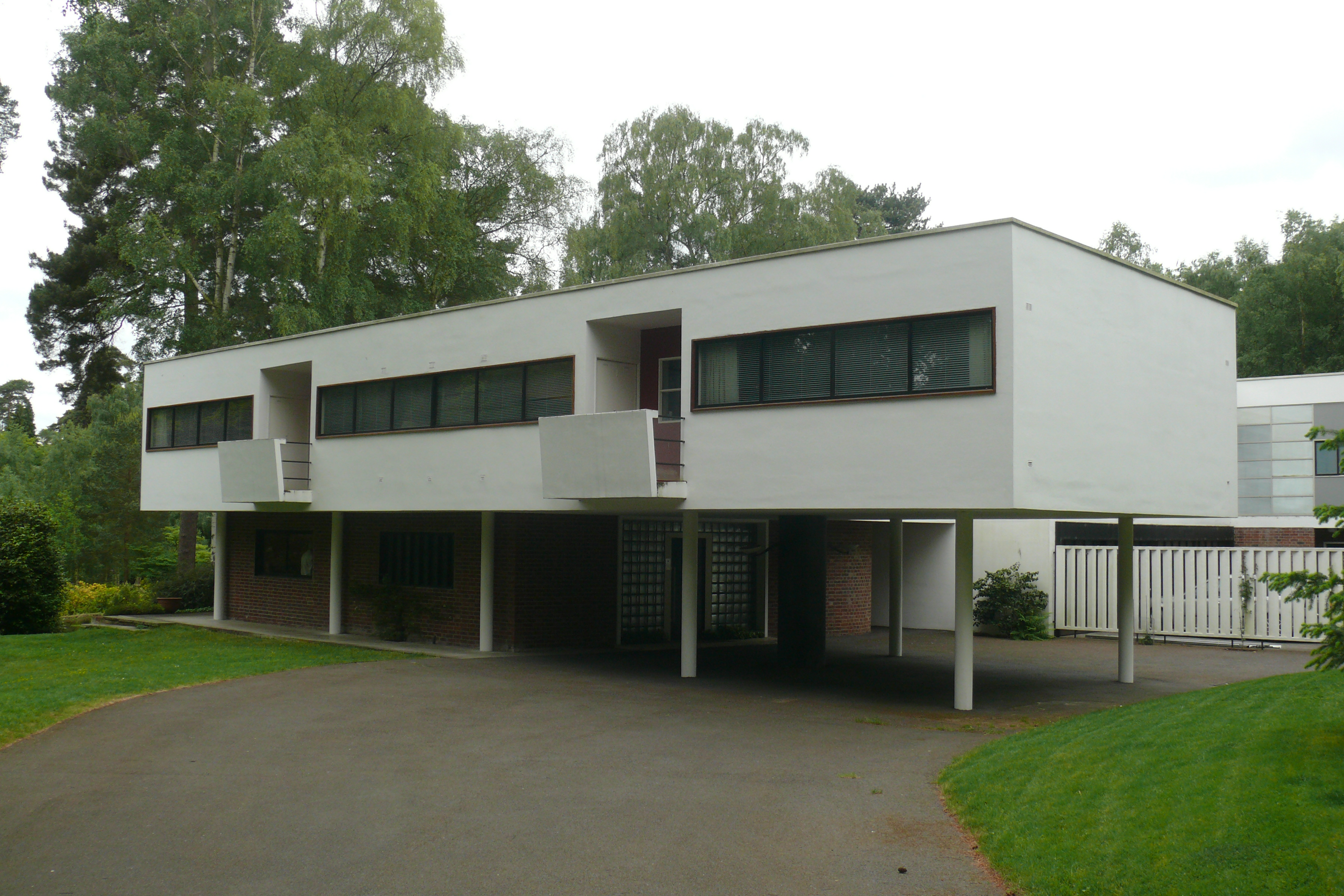
The bedroom wing from the north east

With the exception of Patrick Gwynne's office and its associated cloakroom and dedicated entrance hall, all of the rooms in the bedroom wing are on the first floor. Neil Bingham suggests that the design of the wing is a "homage to Shipwrights", the construction of which was supervised by Gwynne in 1937. The curve of the east elevation of the wing is interrupted by a pair of balconies, which Gwynne described as "pulled-out pieces of concrete-like drawers". The windows on the western side side of the wing, overlooking the terrace, are narrower than those on the eastern side.

When The Homewood was built, the wing contained six bedrooms (including the master bedroom suite), but three of the smaller rooms were repartitioned in the 1950s to give a total of five bedrooms. (Note: Neil Bingham suggests that Patrick Gwynne had originally intended the bedroom wing to have five bedrooms, including the master bedroom suite, but that it was built with six to allow his maternal grandmother to live with the family.) The two northernmost bedrooms, one of which has an ensuite bathroom, contain much of their original furniture including cream leather single beds and mahogany bedside tables. Also on the first floor of the wing is the Powder Room, which provided a space for guests not staying overnight to change for dinner or a party.

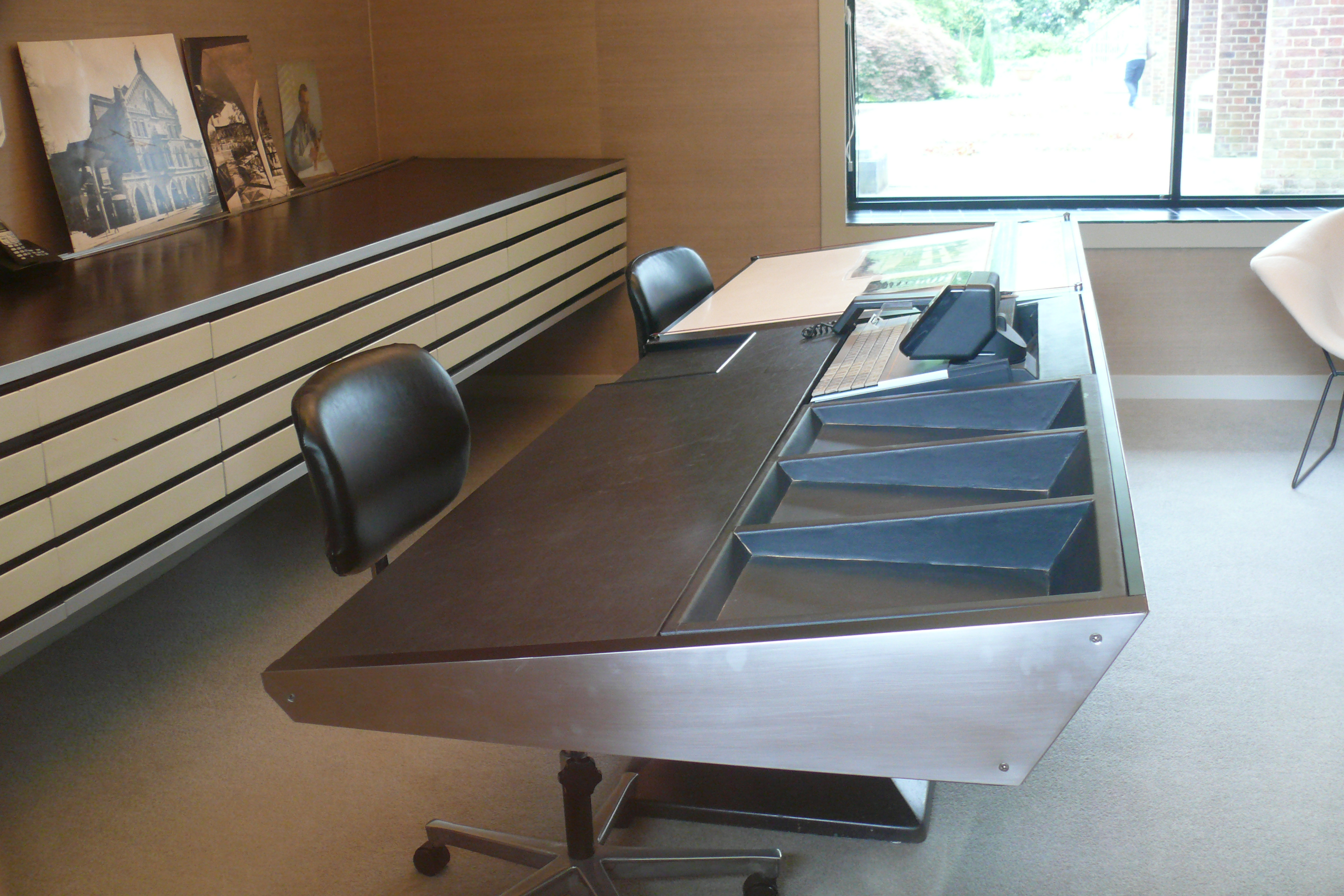
Gwynne's office on the ground floor of the bedroom wing

The office was originally designed for Gwynne's father. Its position, on the ground floor of the bedroom wing, and dedicated entrance, meant that it could be accessed by clients and business associates without having to enter the main part of the house. The current appearance of the office is from a refitting during the 1960s. It contains a circular table and desk, both designed by Gwynne, and chairs by Eero Saarinen, Arne Jacobsen and Harry Bertoia. Three drawings by Henri Gaudier-Brzeska hang on the walls.

The driveway for vehicle access to the house runs beneath the northern part of the bedroom wing.

=== Terrace and garden ===
The terrace runs the length of the south front of the living room wing and incorporates the loggia beneath the rooms above. It links the house to the garden, providing an outdoor living space. It can be reached both via a staircase from the dining room balcony and from the driveway via a lobby area beneath the servants' quarters. (Note: The ground-floor lobby leading to the terrace features a mosaic of glass tiles, in which the words "The Homewood Esher Surrey Patrick Gwynne" appear in black, highly stylised lettering, superimposed on orange tiles that depict the plan of the house.) The oval, mosaic-tiled pool was designed by Denys Lasdun as a housewarming gift for the Gwynne family. The separate swimming pool, designed by Gwynne, was installed in 1974. At the same time, a former servant's bedroom on the ground floor was converted to a sauna, and the paved loggia became a dining area with an outdoor kitchen.

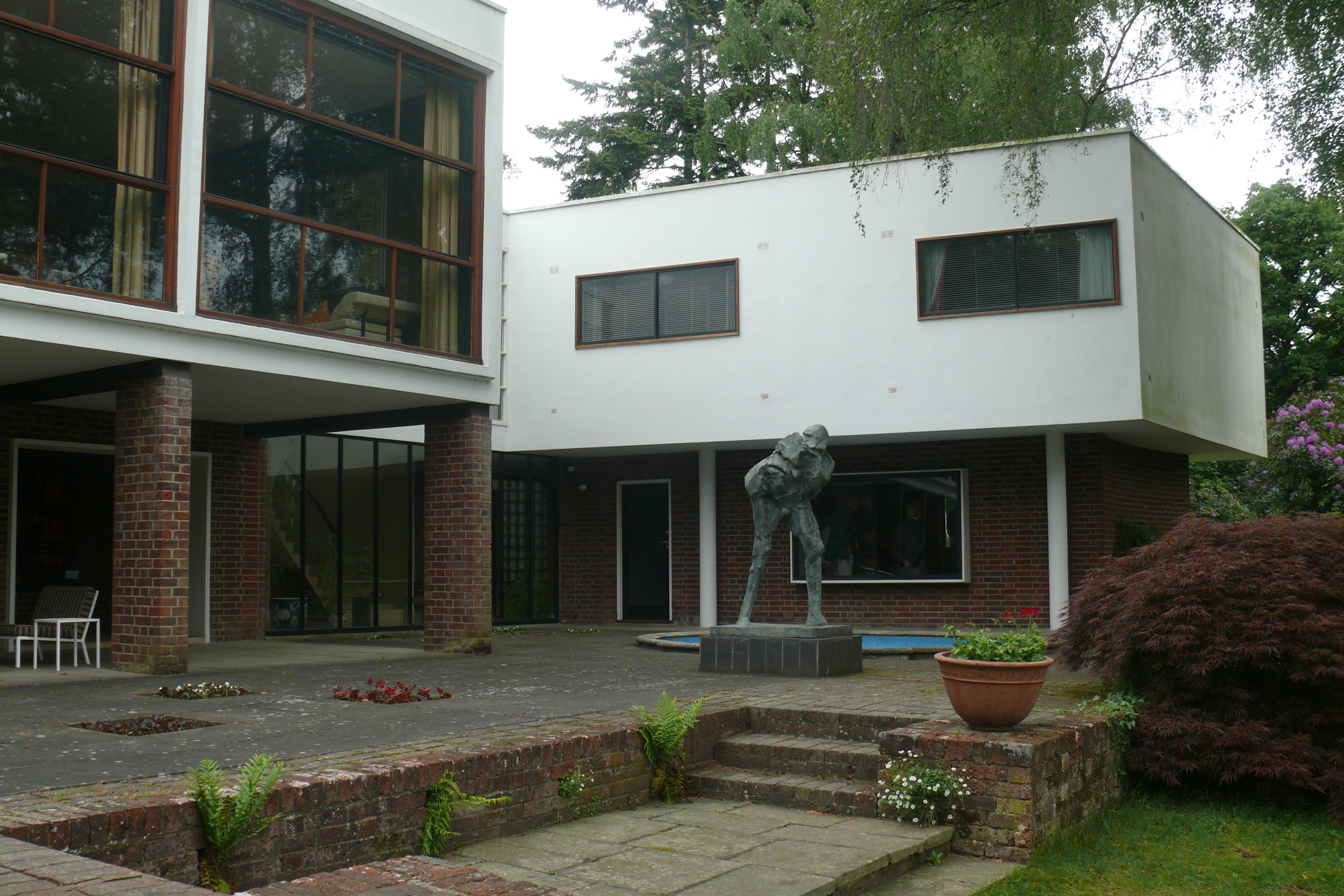
The terrace looking eastwards towards the bedroom wing

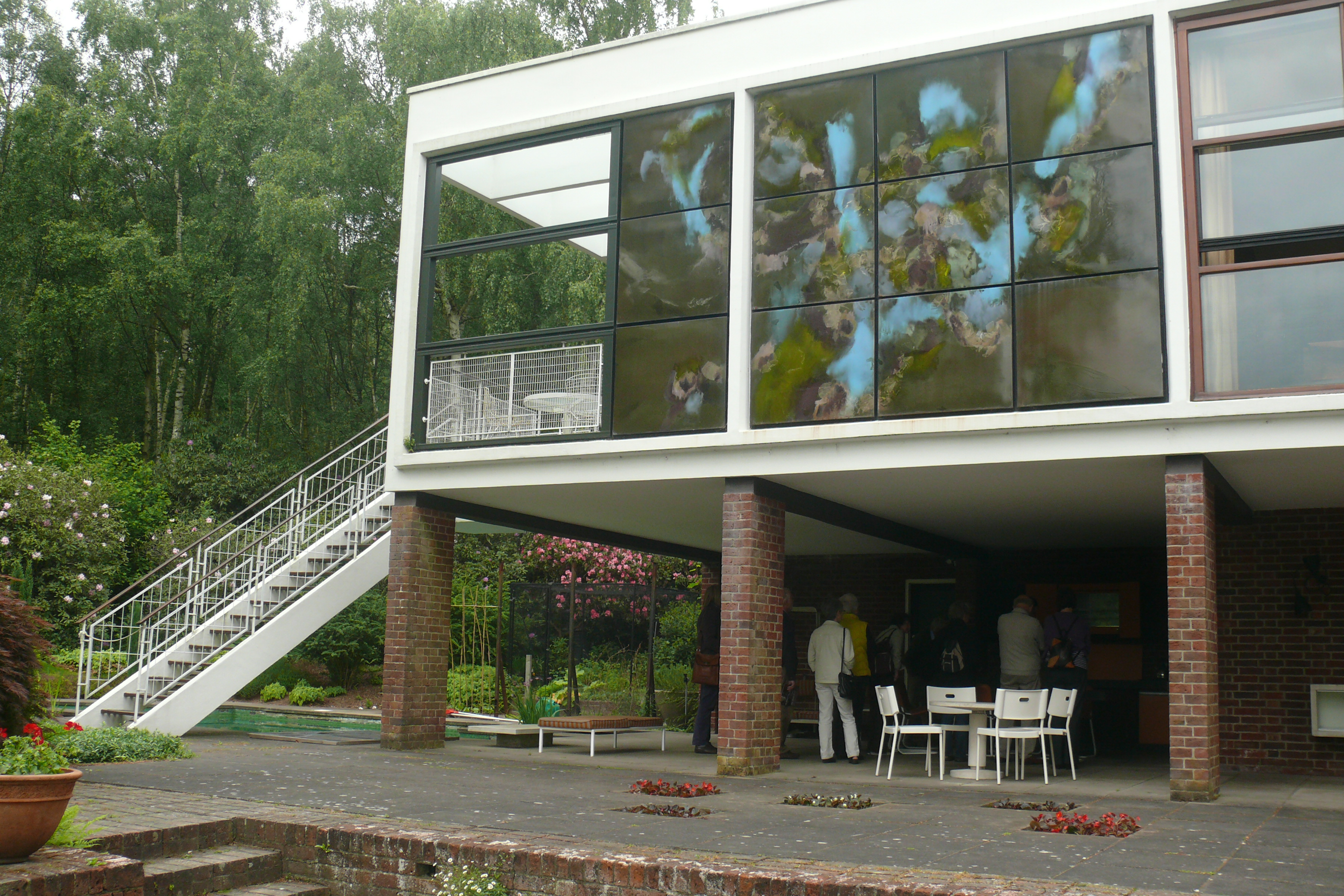
Stairs down from the dining room balcony to the terrace

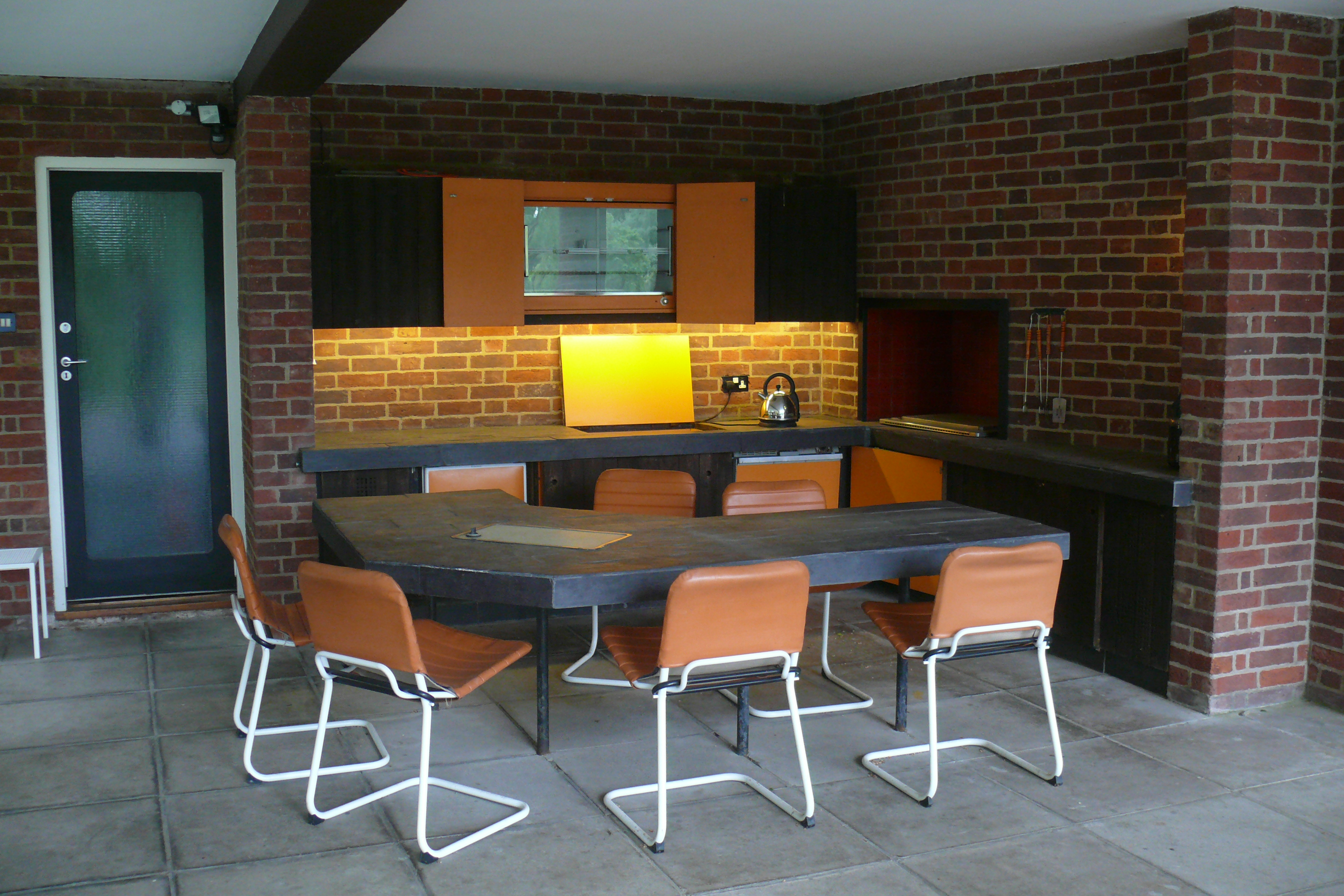
The outdoor kitchen, part of the loggia beneath the living room wing

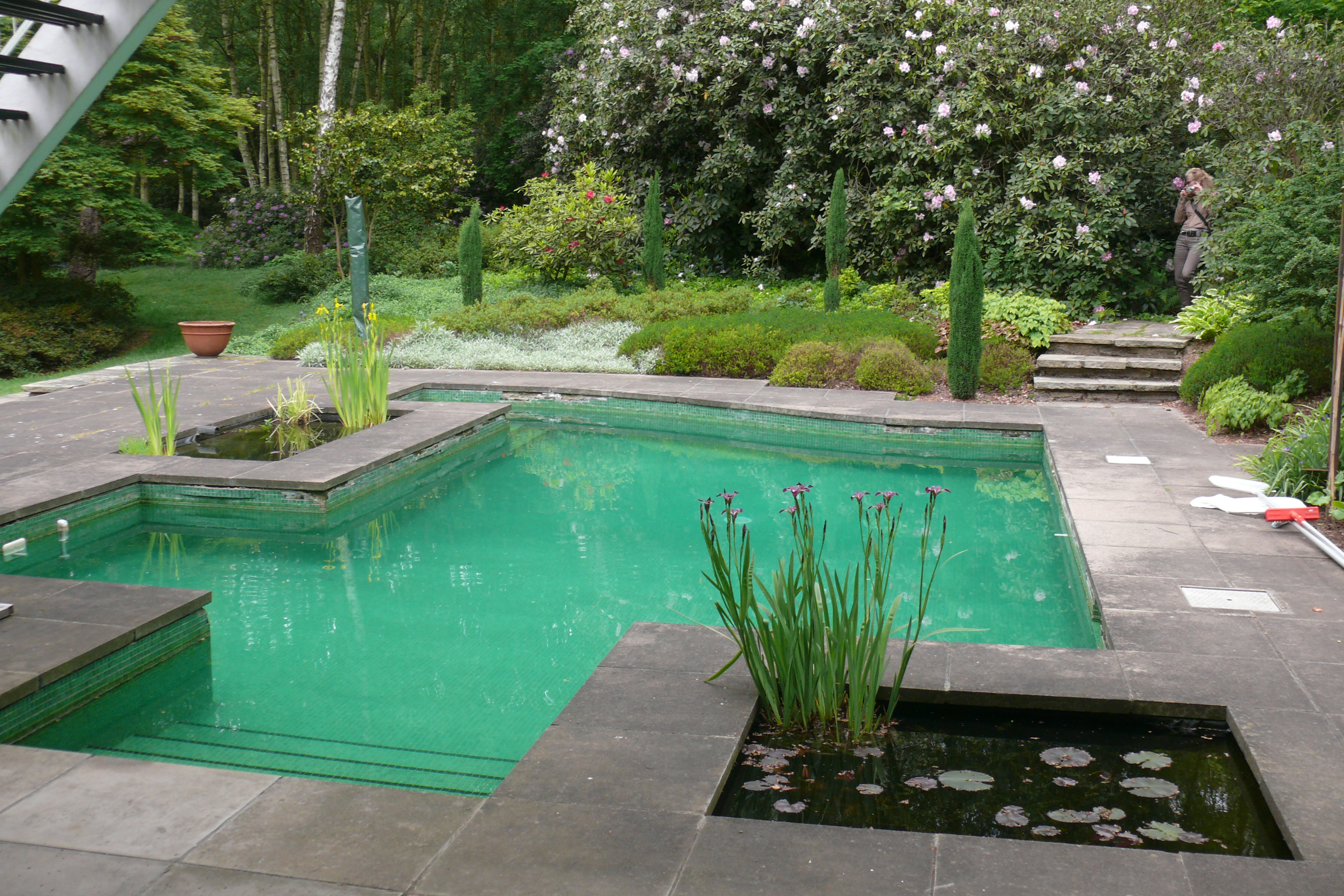
The swimming pool, designed by Patrick Gwynne and installed in 1974

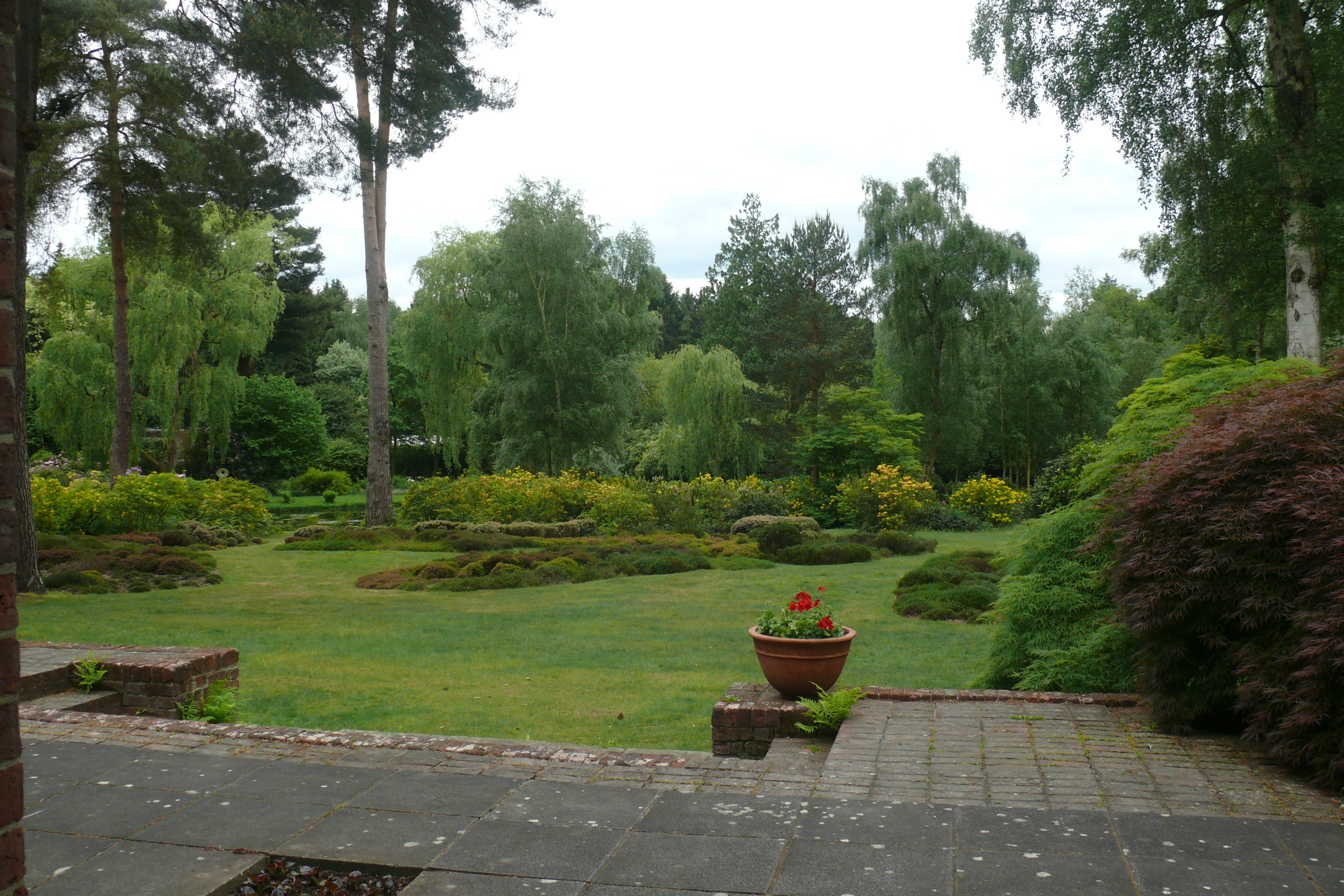
The garden from the terrace

The garden for the Gwynnes's original house was planted by Patrick Gwynne's father, who was an amateur horticulturalist; Gwynne did not start his own work on the land surrounding The Homewood until the 1960s. The southern part of the garden surrounds a tributary stream of the River Mole, the course of which he widened to create three ponds and a bog garden. Spring colour in the garden is provided by Rhododendrons and bluebells, and autumn interest by Japanese maples close to the house. Eclipse, a 1999 sculpture in Portland stone by Bridget McCrum, is surrounded by an area of willow trees. Gwynne's ashes are buried at the foot of a copper beech tree that was planted in March 2004.

== Reception ==
Contemporary reviews of The Homewood note the originality of the design in the application of modern architecture in a family home. An anonymous article published in The Architectural Review in 1939, states that "it constitutes an interesting experiment in country house planning" and that it "represents a remarkably thorough exploration of the aesthetic and practical possibilities latent in the application of a new technique to the old problems of the country house." In a similar vein, Charles Herbert Reilly, an English architect, writes in an edition of the Architects' Journal in 1940 that The Homewood is "one of those exciting modern houses which look so thrilling when photographed at night, especially when they have as this a curved staircase showing through a wall of glass and reflected in a pool outside. One feels some strange creatures from another planet should soon appear... I cannot help feeling one must be under forty with no bad habits to enjoy oneself thoroughly in this plate-glass world."

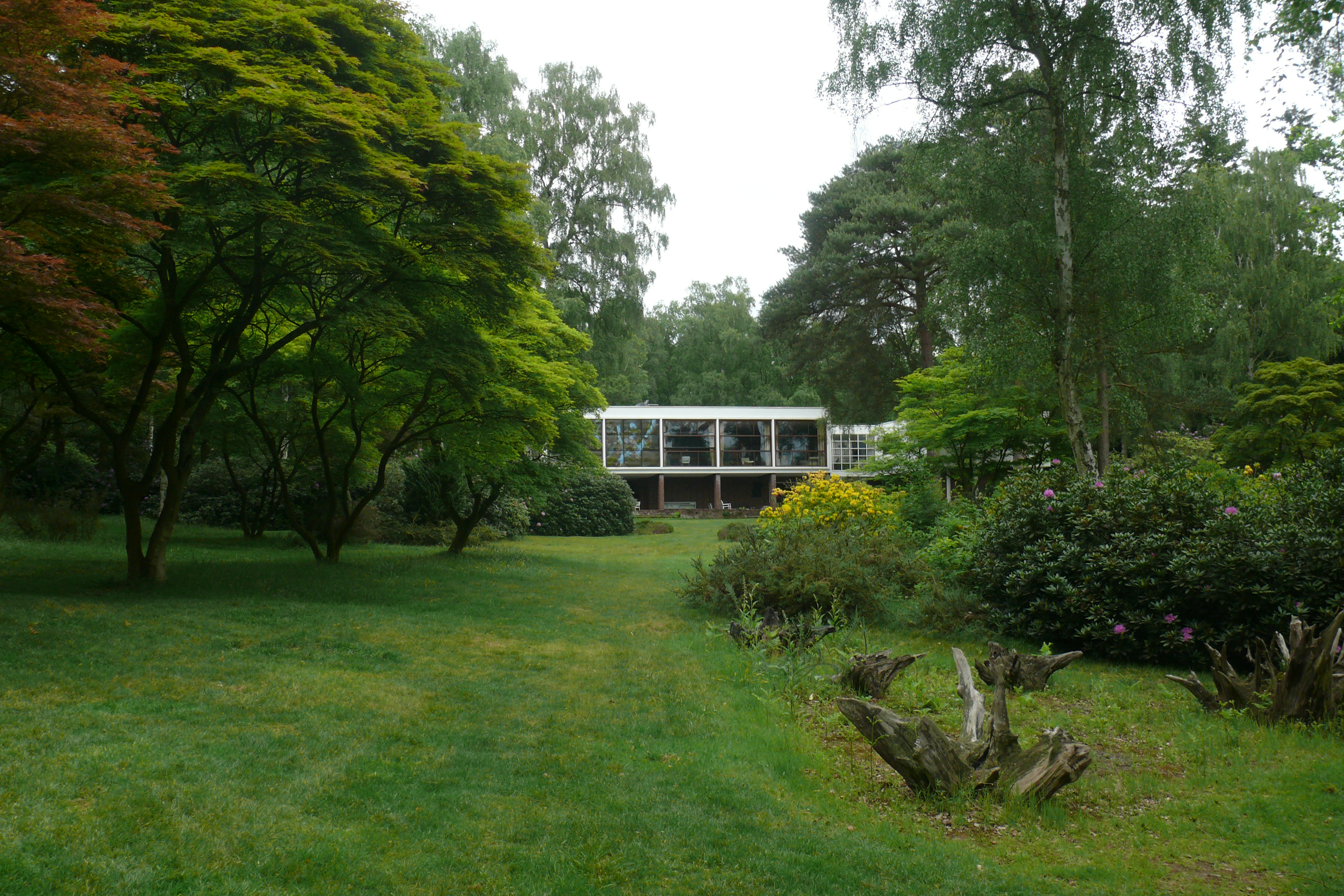
The living room and terrace from the garden

Several later commentators have praised the way in which the house integrates with its surroundings. Neil Bingham writes that The Homewood "takes full advantage of its site, and in the modern manner of the period found new and surprising ways of integrating the outdoors with the interior." Clive Aslet and Alan Powers suggest that the house has "a Japanese sense of contemplative response in harmony with nature", while Kenneth Powell writes that "The ensemble of house and garden is, of course, as typically English as a John Piper painting." Harriet McKay, Curator of 2 Willow Road, Hampstead, another modernist house owned by the National Trust, writes that "The Homewood's piloti allow it to float beautifully over its surroundings…" and that "Gwynne's concern to integrate interior with outdoors is further enhanced by his careful consideration of the site's landscaping... [R]ooms look down onto and over the gardens that meant as much to Gwynne as the house."

On the materials used in the construction, Mitchell Owens comments that "Gwynne, a bachelor who favoured Aston Martin sports cars, created a pavilion of dogma-approved reinforced concrete, brick and glass and then idiosyncratically furnished it with luxurious materials that suited his epicurean personality." He adds that "the sensual sweeps of wood, the seductive glitter of gilt [and] the costly details... make it more [Pierre] Balmain than Bauhaus." Similarly Powell writes "Like other English modernists, Gwynne moderated the severity of continental modern movement design by using 'natural' materials like brick and timber." He adds, "The Homewood is proof that modern architecture is neither necessarily inhuman nor a threat to civilisation. It is also a classic example of the English tradition of design." McKay considers that "The Homewood was a house in which its creator intended to have fun", and notes that "love of luxury and novelty might have run riot at the hands of a lesser modernist, but Gwynne's detailing of The Homewood was to remain contained by an equally strongly felt concern for a stylishness too polite to tolerate the meretriciously flashy."

Katie Treggiden, a design writer, comments: "The Homewood is not only a striking example of early British Modernism by talented young architect, Patrick Gwynne, it’s also a record of his life, giving it a contemporary edge often lacking in stately homes." She continues: "What makes the property particularly interesting is that Gwynne used it as a testing ground for new ideas throughout his career, so rather than capturing a moment in time, it continued to evolve in the spirit of Modernism." Charles O'Brien, Ian Nairn and Bridget Cherry consider that The Homewood "is perhaps the most successful realisation in England of the mid-20th century modernist striving for a pristine classical, rational villa in a mature landscape."

== Sources ==
- Aslet, Clive; Powers, Alan (1985). The National Trust Book of the English House. National Trust. ISBN 978-0-14-006508-4.
- Bingham, Neil (2004). The Homewood. London: The National Trust. ISBN 978-1-84-359100-9.
- Bingham, Neil (2023). Patrick Gwynne. Twentieth Century Architects. Liverpool: Liverpool University Press. ISBN 978-1-80-207754-4.
- Greeves, Lydia (2021) [2008]. Houses of the National Trust (4th ed.). London: Harper Collins. ISBN 978-1-91-165711-8.
- O'Brien, Charles; Nairn, Ian; Cherry, Bridget (2022) [1962]. Pevsner, Nikolaus (ed.). Surrey. The Buildings of England. London: Yale University Press. ISBN 978-0-30-023478-7.
- "House at Esher, Surrey". Architectural Review. Vol. 86, no. 514. September 1939. pp. 103–116.
- Treasures from the National Trust. London: Pavilion Books. 2007. ISBN 978-1-90-540045-4.
