= Piloti =

Functional architectural component of some buildings

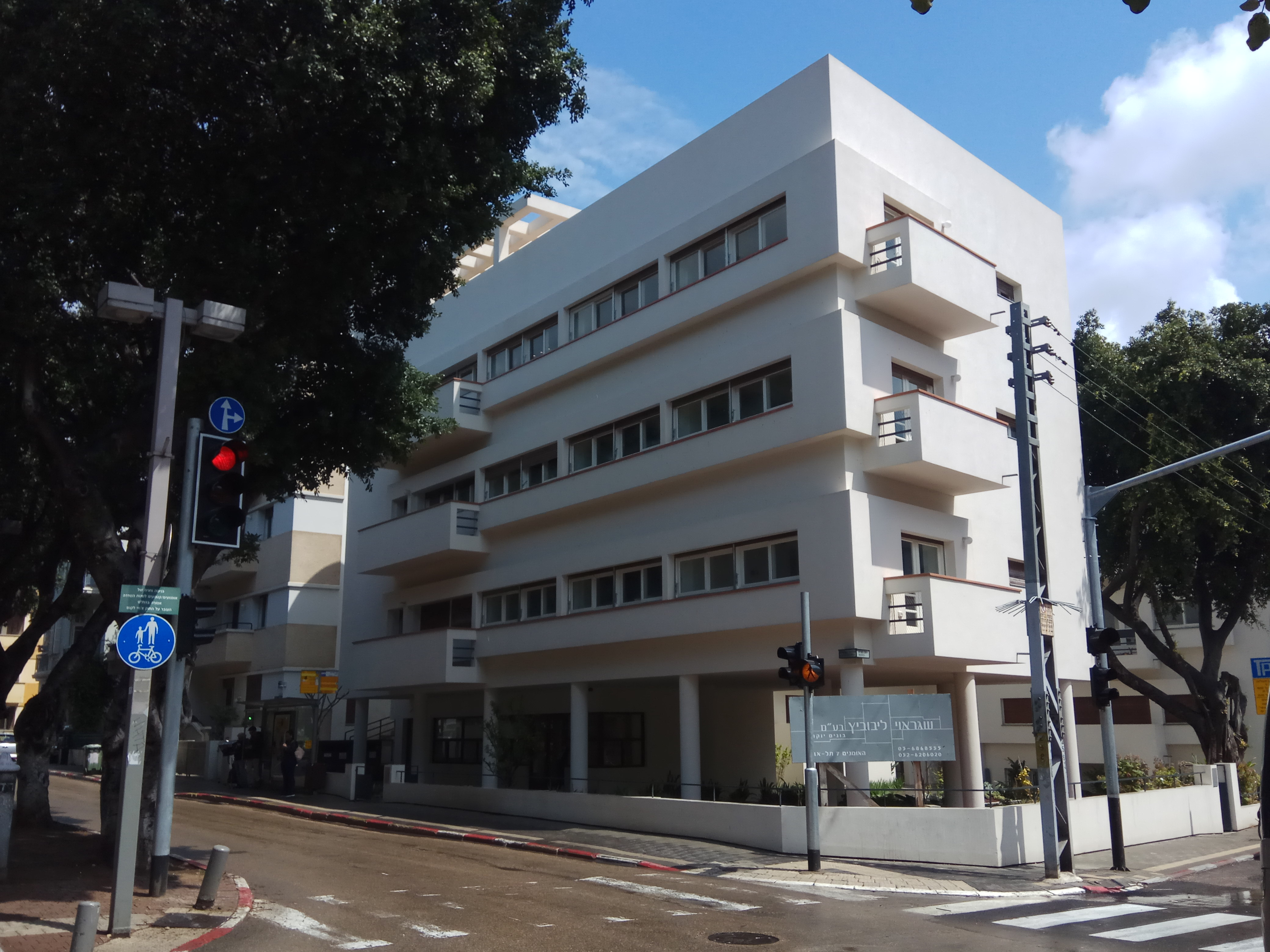
The Engel House in the White City of Tel Aviv. Architect: Zeev Rechter, 1933. A residential building that has become one of the symbols of Modernist architecture. The first building in Tel Aviv to be built on pilotis.

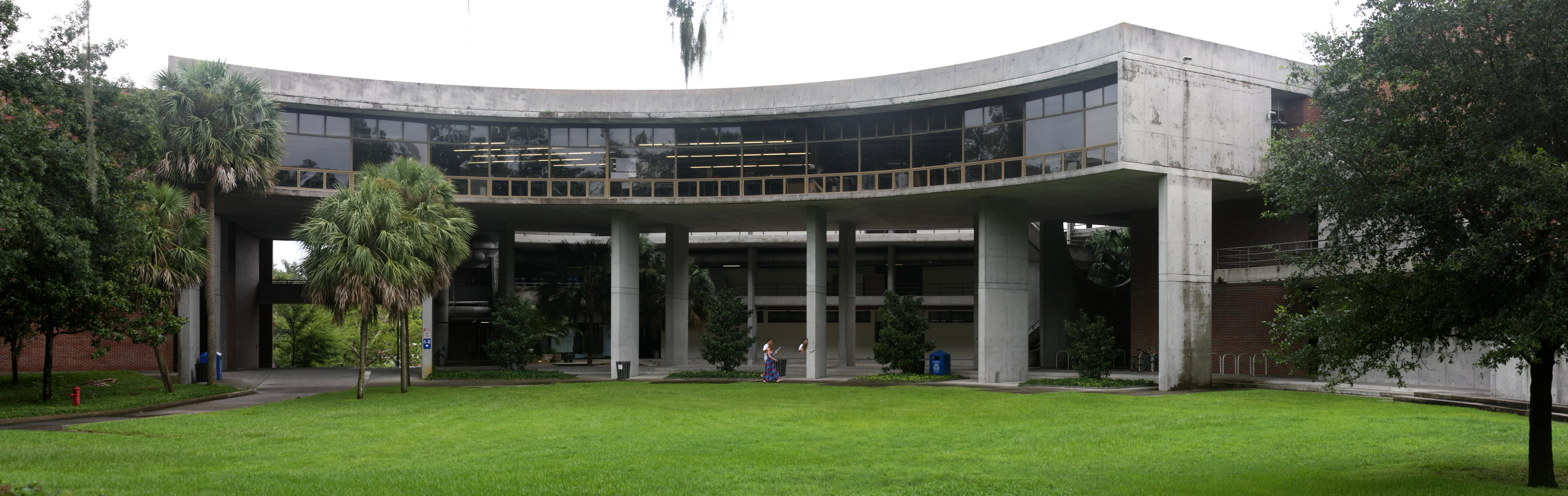
University of Florida (1979). There is space for lush vegetation under the building. Visible concrete pilotis.

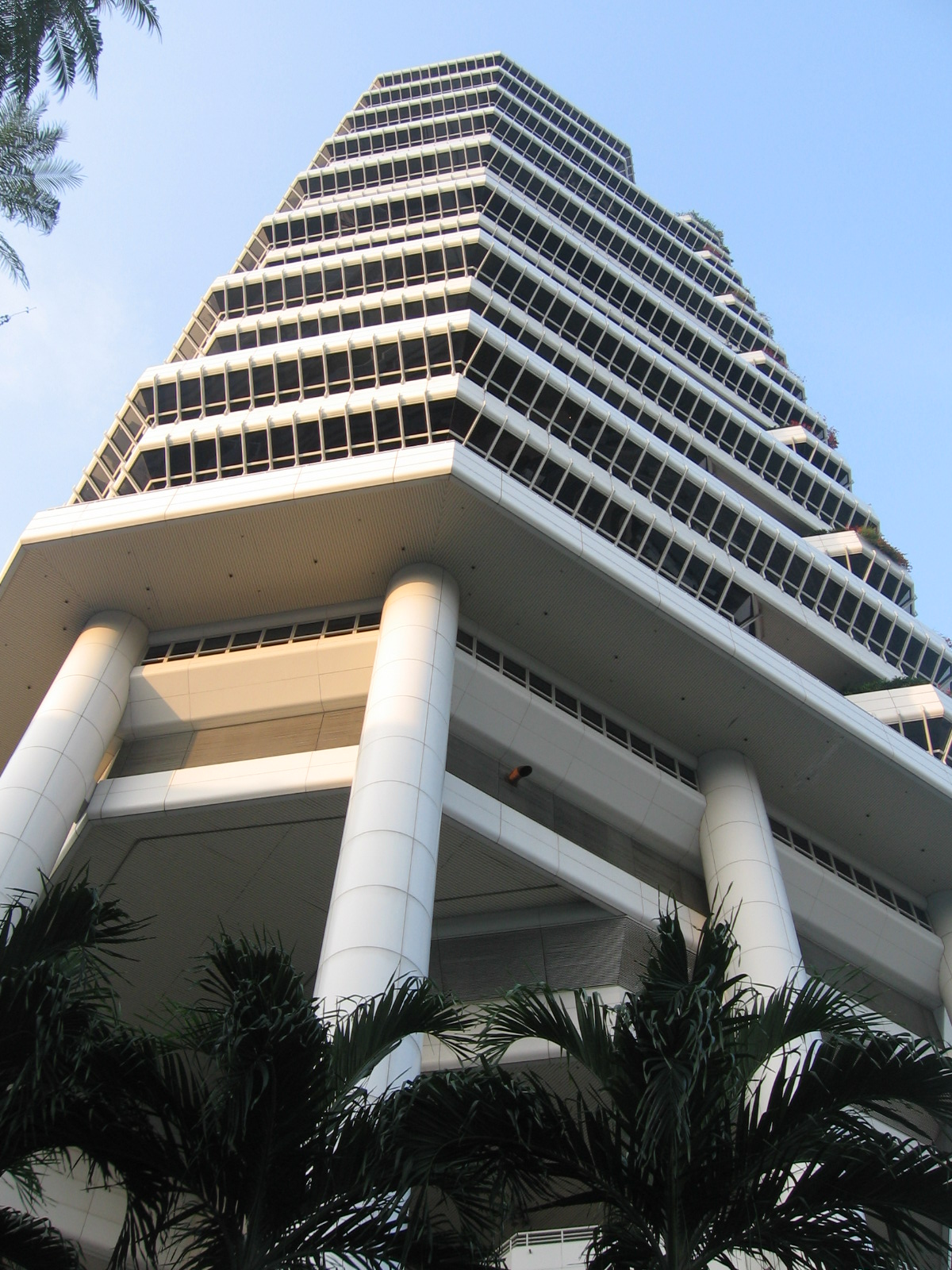
Paul Rudolph's The Concourse (1994) in Singapore is supported on large pilotis.

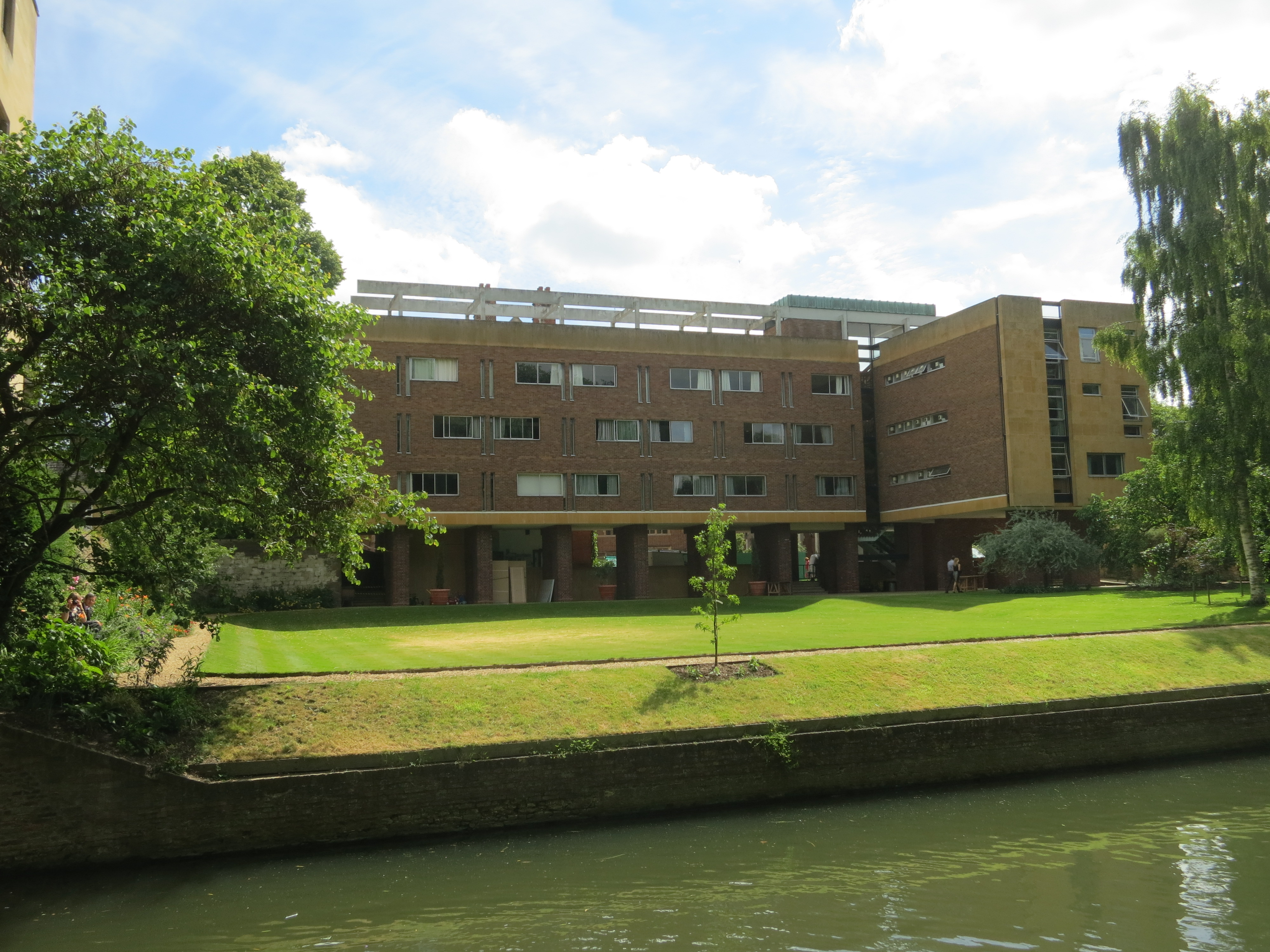
Erasmus building at Queens' College, Cambridge (1959). Designed by Basil Spence and directly inspired by Le Corbusier.

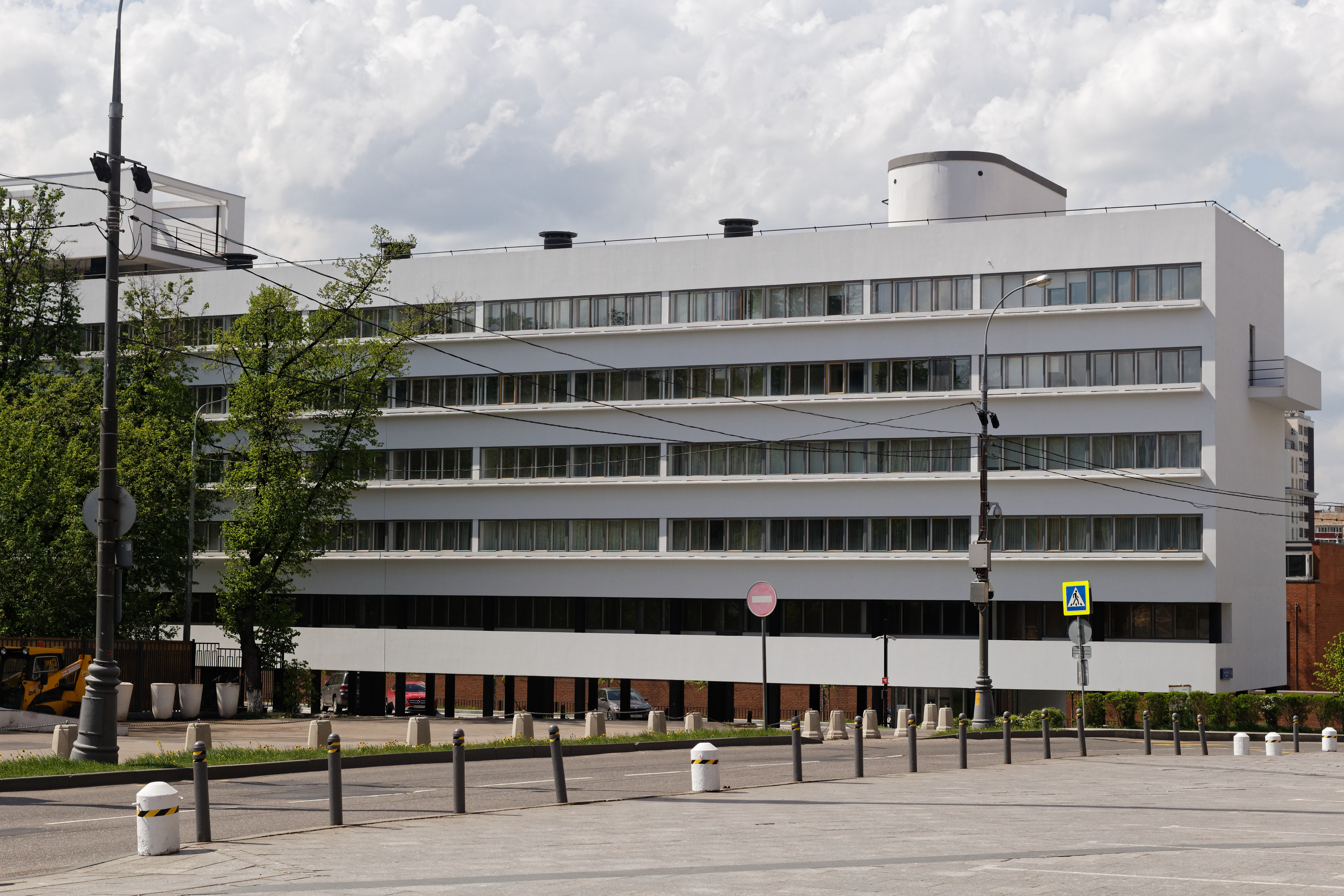
Modern architecture: apartment building Narkomfin in Moscow, Moisei Ginzburg (1930).

Pilotis, or piers, are supports such as columns, pillars, or stilts that lift a building above ground or water. They are traditionally found in stilt and pole dwellings such as fishermen's huts in Asia and Scandinavia using wood, and in elevated houses such as Old Queenslanders in Australia's tropical Northern state, where they are called "stumps". Pilotis are a fixture of modern architecture, and were recommended by the modern architect Le Corbusier in his manifesto, the Five Points of Architecture.

== Function ==
Le Corbusier's Villa Savoye, Poissy, France

In modern architecture, pilotis (or piers) are ground-level supporting columns. A prime example is Le Corbusier's Villa Savoye in Poissy, France. Another is Patrick Gwynne's The Homewood in Surrey, England.

Beyond their support function, the pilotis raise the architectural volume, lighten it and free a space for circulation under the construction. They refine a building's connectivity with the land by allowing for parking, garden or driveway below while allowing a sense of floating and lightness in the architecture itself. In hurricane-prone areas, pilotis may be used to raise the inhabited space of a building above typical storm surge levels.

Le Corbusier used them in a variety of forms from slender posts to the massive Brutalist look of the Marseilles Housing Unit (1945–1952) with a range of bases, inclusions and surfaces. This was part of Le Corbusier's idea of machine-like efficiency where land, people and buildings would work together optimally.
