= Cité Frugès de Pessac =

Coordinates: 44.7990°N 0.6477°W

- Main street of the Cité Frugès
- Interactive map of the Cité Frugès de Pessac area
- Alternative names: Quartiers Modernes Frugès

General information
- Type: Single-family house to sixplex
- Architectural style: International style
- Location: Pessac, Bordeaux, France, 4 Rue le Corbusier, 33600 Pessac, France
- Construction started: 1924
- Construction stopped: 1926
- Client: Henri Frugès
- Owner: Mostly private owners

Technical details
- Structural system: reinforced concrete frame with CMU infill

Design and construction
- Architects: Le Corbusier and Pierre Jeanneret
- Designations: UNESCO World Heritage Site, monument historique

Other information
- Number of units: 51 built, 135 planned

UNESCO World Heritage Site
- Official name: Cité Frugès de Pessac
- Criteria: Cultural: i, ii, vi
- Reference: 1321-003
- Inscription: 2016 (40th Session)
- Area: 2,179 ha (5,380 acres)
- Buffer zone: 26,475 ha (65,420 acres)

The Cité Frugès de Pessac (the Frugès Estate of Pessac), or Les Quartiers Modernes Frugès (the modern Frugès quarters), is a housing development located in Pessac, a suburb of Bordeaux, France. It was commissioned by the industrialist Henri Frugès in 1924 as worker housing and designed by architects Le Corbusier and Pierre Jeanneret, who were responsible for the development's masterplan and individual buildings. It was intended as a testing ground for the ideas Le Corbusier had expressed in his 1922 manifesto Vers une Architecture and was his first attempt designing low-cost, mass-produced collective housing in his trademark aesthetic. Drawings of some of the buildings were subsequently included in the second edition of the text.

The Cité was planned to contain 135 housing units in four sections, but only two sections (consisting of 51 units) were realized due to financial difficulties. By the time they were completed, the houses were three to four times more expensive than envisioned and about twice as expensive as comparable houses on the market. The workers refused to move in, forcing Frugès to sell the individual houses in the same year after a failed attempt to sell the entire estate. Over the next decades, the houses were heavily modified by their inhabitants, including the addition of pitched roofs and decoration, the resizing of windows, and the enclosure of patios.

On December 18, 1980, No. 3 Rue des Arcades was listed as a French monument historique. The whole complex was subsequently designated a French Zone de Protection du Patrimoine Architectural Urbain (an Urban Architectural Heritage Protection Zone). In 2016, the district was designated a UNESCO World Heritage Site as part of The Architectural Work of Le Corbusier, along with 16 other projects.

== History ==
Henri Baronet-Frugès (1879-1974) came from a wealthy family operating one of the last sugar refineries in Bourdeaux, of which he became a manager in 1913. While he also owned wine and carpet factories, Frugès considered himself more an artist than an industrialist and continued his artistic pursuits and interests throughout his life. In 1912, he and his wife bought the Maison Davergne in downtown Bordeaux. They began a 14-year project with the architect Pierre Ferret to renovate the house into an Art Nouveau/Art Deco showpiece. During this time, Ferret introduced Frugès to the avant-garde magazine L'Espirit Nouveau where he first learned of and became interested in the ideas Le Corbusier would develop in his 1922 manifesto Toward an Architecture.

Following a 1920 meeting with Le Corbusier, Frugès commissioned a small worker housing complex (~10 units) near his sawmill in Lège to allow Le Corbusier to test his ideas about purism, standardization, efficiency, and machine production. Before construction began on the Lège project, Frugès commissioned Pessac (135 units) as a larger-scale prototype. He wanted it to serve as a testing ground, "extreme as the consequences may be." The site was chosen because it was surrounded by forests and previously unbuilt, as well as for its proximity to the factories where its residents would be employed, the railroad, and a tuberculosis hospital. The complex's forest location is an influence of the Garden City movement, which held natural landscapes were important for the health and well-being of urban residents.

Construction began in 1924 and encountered a host of problems before stopping in 1926. The whole estate was put up for sale but attracted no buyers. In 1928, the French government began giving low-cost loans to low-income workers, which aided the purchase of individual dwellings over time. The financial toll of the project, as well as unrelated business issues, resulted in the liquidation of Frugès's companies by 1929. Following a period of depression, Frugès moved to Tunisia, then Algeria where he continued composing, painting, and drawing until his death in 1974. Le Corbusier lost interest in Pessac before its completion and would go on to "virtually disown" the Lège project. The structures were freely modified by their inhabitants after they became privately owned, including through additions, ornamentation, and the resizing of windows. Modifications were documented in Philippe Boudon's 1969 study of the project.

In 1942, one of the houses was destroyed in a World War II bombing targeting the nearby railroad.

In 1983, the city of Pessac bought one of the private houses, restored it, and opened it for tours. Since then, the development has become increasingly desirable for residents and visited by architectural tourists. Some of the structures have been restored to a semblance of their intended state, though others remain in a state of disrepair.

== Design ==
Le Corbusier took into account prevailing social and economic factors, and was determined to build the plan to provide people with low-cost, predetermined, homogeneous cubist structures.

Le Corbusier painted panels of brown, blue, yellow and jade green in response to the clients request for "decoration". Scholars have seen these panels as an attempt to dissolve the building's mass into planes and the landscape, transposing cubist and purist experiments with spatial perception into architecture.

The layout consists of:

A terrace of about 8 three storey houses with roof gardens. Behind them is a terrace of houses connected to each other with a concrete arch which provides a sheltered garden. In the middle of the development are the interlocking houses.

=== Cellule System and Typology ===
Le Corbusier employed the cellule module to standardize the dwellings. Thecellule functioned as the basic unit of mass but did not have a predetermined programmatic function. Three basic units are employed throughout: a 5x5 meter 1 cellule, a 5x2.5 meter 1/2 cellule, and a 2.5x2.5 1/4 cellule. These are augmented by seven other units for stairs, entrances, and roofs. Following the consideration of functional needs, Le Corbusier aggregated cellules into a final massing. Additional geometric forms were then added to further differentiate each housing type. Combinations proceeded with explicit attention towards making them easy for assembly-line mass production and to aesthetically reflect the logic of production.

The complex contains five distinct housing types of one to six units named after a physical characteristic: the two-story quinconces (staggered), zig-zag (Z-formation), arcade, and isolé (free-standing) and the three-story gratte-ciel (skyscraper). There is also a block of six attached houses. A system of proportion based on the cellule and window sizes dictate the relationship between the types. While the interiors differed, each type is articulated as a single vertical building with different combinations of forms. Programmatically, the houses contain an entrance space, a kitchen, a living space, a sleeping area, and service space.

== Construction ==
Construction began on the complex in 1924 and ended in 1926. Only 51 (sections C and D) of the 135 planned units were completed. Almost immediately, construction was beset by problems, partially the result of incomplete architectural designs. When they were sold, units originally envisioned as affordable to the working-class were valued between 51,300 (for attached houses No. 49-54) and 74,100 francs (for single-family house No. 37), three to four times more expensive than planned. Comparable houses were on the market for 30,000 to 35,000 francs.

=== The Cement Gun and Contractor Problems ===
Near the end of 1924, M. Poncet, Frugès' Head of Buildings and construction manager for the Lège project, began preparing the Pessac site for building. By April 1925, construction had progressed on the concrete structure of the Zig-Zag houses and attached houses No. 49-54. They were using the newly-available cement gun to build infill wall panels, a reflection of Le Corbusier's desire to employ new technologies. During site visits to both projects on April 7, 1925, Le Corbusier was dissatisfied with the quality of work, calling it an "extremely precarious and dangerous situation" (for instance, the foundation of a dormitory at Lège had collapsed and residents had to be evacuated). He called for a work stoppage and Poncet's replacement with Parisian builder Georges Summer, with whom he had previously worked on the Pavillon de l'Esprit Nouveau. By May, after some reticence from Frugès, a team from Summer's studio consisting of a foreman and eight craftsmen had restarted work on the project, at much higher wages. This, along with issues creating hollow walls with even thicknesses, meant the use of CMU-block infill, laid by hand, was necessary to achieve the desired "high-precision, machine-made look." Gunnite spray was only employed for facing curved walls and other minor details.

=== Custom Prefabricated Components ===
In keeping with the desire to mass-produce the entire house, Le Corbusier wanted to work with mass-produced elements. For the window frames, he opted for custom-designed window frames manufactured by Decourt and Company, instead of using designs already available in Bordeaux. The need to quickly produce these custom components raised costs "substantially." By 1927, the windows were leaking due to poor drainage on the sill.

=== Site Planning Issues ===
In October 1925, Frugès sent a letter to Le Corbusier noting one of the gratte-ciels was sitting on the planned route of a provincial road and suggesting density cuts to accommodate the municipality. At the same time, it became clear that the project had not respected laws governing the provision of public services and would not win governmental approval.

== Critical reception ==
The scheme was generally panned by critics at the time. In 1929, architectural historian Henry-Russell Hitchcock called it a "serious disappointment" with "uncomfortable" interiors. Others characterized it as "a Sultan's district, a harem, and ... as a Moroccan settlement." Sigfried Giedion references Pessac (as well as the Villa Savoye and the League of Nations building) in 1941's Space, Time and Architecture as an embodiment of his concept of transparent space-time.

In 1969, the architect Philippe Boudon published a post-occupancy assessment of the project titled Pessac de Le Corbusier: 1927–1967, Étude Socio-Architecturale (translated in 1972 as Lived-In Architecture: Le Corbusier's Pessac Revisited) detailing how residents had adapted the structures to fit their lives since its completion. He said the houses helped residents realize what they needed and allowed them to satisfy those needs, though the book was broadly seen as critical of Pessac. In response to the radical changes documented within, Le Corbusier commented that "life is always right; it is the architect who is wrong."

In 1981, the New York Times' architecture critic Ada Louis Huxtable said the development "continues to give something to the eye and the spirit that only buildings shaped and informed by a superior and caring eye and spirit can." Many still consider it a failure of modern architecture's desire to house the masses, alongside Pruitt-Igoe in the United States.

== See also ==
- Weissenhof Siedlung
- Le Corbusier's Five Points of Architecture
