= Toward an Architecture =

Le Corbusier's 1923 manifesto for modern architecture

- Cover of Goodman's 2007 translation.
- Author: Le Corbusier
- Original title: Vers une architecture
- Translator: Frederick Etchells (1927); John Goodman (2007)
- Language: French
- Subject: architecture, modernism
- Publisher: Getty Research Institute
- Publication date: 1923
- Publication place: France
- English publication date: 1927 (Etchells trans.), 2007 (Goodman trans.)
- Media type: Paperback
- Pages: 358
- ISBN: 0-89236-822-5
- OCLC: 77476538
- Dewey Decimal: 720 22
- LC Class: NA2520 .J413 2007

Vers une architecture (Toward an Architecture, originally mistranslated as Towards a New Architecture) is a 1923 collection of essays written by French architect Le Corbusier advocating for the tenets of modern architecture. It dismissed eclecticism and Gothic architecture as mere stylistic experiments, instead advocating for fundamentally changing how humans interacted with buildings. It claimed that the industrial age demanded an architecture and aesthetics based purely on the relationship between function and form. It is notable for positing that architecture can help solve social issues, a key aim of early modern architecture. The manifesto is sometimes referred to simply as Vers in English.

Since its publication, it has been influential on discourses of modernism in architecture, attracting both supporters and detractors inside and outside the profession. In 1960, the architectural historian Reyner Banham wrote that its influence was "beyond that of any other architectural work published in this [20th] century to date."

== Background ==
In 1918, Corbusier and Amédée Ozenfant announced a series of books in Après le cubisme that included the "in press" Vers une architecture. They reiterated this claim in a 1921 advertisement in L'Esprit nouveau, the avant-garde French magazine of which both men were founders. The majority of the book would eventually appear in the magazine's pages as twelve separate essays, beginning in 1920. Nine of these would be condensed into three triads for the book. With a budding reputation in painting circles, Corbusier intended the articles to establish him as an intellectual in architecture. The essays synthesized ideas Corbusier had developed during a 14-year Grand Tour of Europe at the turn of the century and time working for the modernist architects Auguste Perret and Peter Behrens. Broadly, it was an attempt to reconcile Corbusier's German and Latin influences and industrialization and Classical culture.

Before its eventual distribution in 1923, the book went by various working titles, including Architecture ou révolution, Architecture et révolution, and L'architecture nouvelle, though the 1918 title was eventually used. In 1922, Corbusier obtained a contract from the publisher Crès for a first printing of 3,000 copies. The unconventional layouts initially provoked consternation but were eventually used. The book was a success and Crès agreed to publish a series of volumes under the name Collection de L'Esprit nouveau. The series included the 1924 second edition of Vers and continued until 1932. The first volume of Corbusier's Oeuvre complète from 1930 extends his considerations of his own work begun in Vers.

Kenneth Frampton identifies additional influences on the book including early 19th-century utopian socialism and publications from the Deutscher Werkbund, particularly a 1913 essay by Walter Gropius. Cohen further identifies Friedrich Nietzsche, Charles Baudelaire, John Ruskin, Stéphane Mallarmé, and Comte de Lautréamont as literary and "structural" influences.

=== Authorship ===
Though Le Corbusier is credited as the sole author, the book's authorship is somewhat unclear. Corbusier co-signed the original essays with fellow purist painter and friend Amédée Ozenfant as "Le Corbusier-Saugnier" when they were published in L'Esprit nouveau, indicating that Ozenfant may have contributed to the articles (Saugnier was Ozenfant's mother's name). Indeed, the first edition of the book (as well as an initial sketch of the cover) identifies the text's author as "Le Corbusier-Saugnier," though Corbusier dedicated it to Ozenfant in order to undercut Ozenfant's authorship claim. However, Corbusier began claiming sole authorship in 1924 and the dedication is absent from editions including and subsequent to the 1924 reprint. As their friendship deteriorated into the 1930s, Ozenfant claimed that the book had developed out of conversations between the two of them, though the ideas principally belonged to Adolf Loos's 1913 Ornament and Crime essay and Auguste Perret. Later, Ozenfant implied that he withdrew his public claim to authorship at Corbusier's request, though as late as 1936, a "rumor" was still attributing the book to both of them. Today, Vers continues to be solely attributed to Corbusier.

== Content ==
Vers is composed of seven essays. It begins with short, aphoristic summaries of each essay in a section titled "Argument" (Advertissment) preceded by an Introduction. In his 1927 translation, Etchells replaces Corbusier's preface with his own 12-page Introduction. Goodman's 2007 translation contains Corbusier's revised second edition Introduction and a lengthy article by the architectural historian Jean-Louis Cohen contextualizing the book. Banham notes that Corbusier says very little affirmatively about aesthetics in Vers, instead relying on functionalism to justify his presented work. The argument is advanced through metaphorical links between the various essays and the juxtaposition of Classical and industrial references, heightened by the prose's poetic quality.

=== Essays ===
Vers is loosely organized into an "academic" and a "mechanical block," reflecting the dual concerns of purism. In Etchells's translation, the essays are titled "The Engineer's Aesthetic and Architecture" (Esthétique de l'ingénieur, architecture): "Three Reminders to Architects" with sections on "Mass" (a mistranslation of the French), "Surface," and "Plan" (Trois rappels a MM. les architects encompassing Le volume, La surface, and le plan); "Regulating Lines" (Les tracés régulateurs); "Eyes Which Do Not See" divided into sections on "Liners," "Airplanes," and "Automobiles" (Des yeux qui ne voient pas and Les paquebots, Les avions, and Les autos); "Architecture" with sections titled "The Lesson of Rome," "The Illusion of Plans," and "Pure Creation of the Mind" (Architecture, La leçon de Rome, L'illusion des plans, and Pure création de l'esprit); "Mass-Production Houses" (Maisons en série); and "Architecture or Revolution" (Architecture ou révolution; published for the first time in Vers).

Goodman's translation conforms more directly to the original French titles and his translations are used in the Summary section. See English Translations.

=== Graphic Design ===
The book's graphic design plays an important role in communicating Corbusier's ideas, using titles, text, images, and captions to surprise the reader, create slogans, and make useful comparisons. The book's layout is akin to a cinematic montage that alternates slow and fast sequences. 249 black and white illustrations reference buildings in countries around the world, including those in North America, Europe, and South America, some of which Corbusier had not seen first-hand. Many of these were drawn from Corbusier's personal collection of archival photographs and newspaper clippings. Some of the illustrations were manipulated to better match Corbusier's rhetoric, including the removal of pediments on grain silos in Buenos Aires and the dome of the Bonsecours market behind silos in Montreal.

Translations of the text sometimes deviated slightly from the original layouts of the French version. In Etchtells's 1927 English translation, the discrepancy between text sizes for headings and text were reduced, though the placement of images in-text conforms to the second French edition. The 1926 German translation did not use the requested capital letters for the titles and some illustrations were changed.

== Summary ==
=== "Aesthetic of the Engineer, Architecture" ===
Corbusier compares the disciplines of architecture and engineering. While the engineers employ scientific methods to "fabricate the tools of their time," architects rely on the tired academic dogma of the École des Beaux-Arts. Architects must instead embrace mathematics, becoming "conscious of [architecture's] own beginnings" and able adapt to the "new perspective and [...] social life" of the Industrial Age. Both architects and society-at-large deserve some blame for this situation; "Three Reminders" and "Regulating Lines" address architects, while "Eyes Which Do No See" assails clients for their aesthetic conservativism. Architecture is more than construction; it must aim "TO MOVE US," creating "architectural emotion" by attaining "certain harmonies." Finally, Corbusier makes a paean to Cubist painters for support in this project, arguing that once their work "take[s its] place in the framework of the period[, ]you will everywhere be admitted and admired" for their advances in aesthetics instead of bearing "so much mockery."

=== "Three Reminders to Architects" ===
Corbusier asserts that "architecture manifests itself" through volume and surface, which are generated by the plan; these considerations make up the essay's three subsections. In Volume, Corbusier explains that "Architecture is the masterly, correct and magnificent play of [volume] brought together in light." The Platonic architecture of ancient Egypt, Greece, and Rome, exemplified in the Pyramids of Giza, Parthenon, and the Colosseum, employ "beautiful forms, the most beautiful forms." Gothic cathedrals, by contrast, are "not very beautiful" because their geometry does "not proceed from the great primary forms." In the second subsection, Corbusier asserts that "the task of the architect is to vitalize the surfaces which clothe these [volumes]" without destroying their volumetric qualities. Doors and windows "must be made an accentuation of form" by following their "generating and accusing lines," typically as a grid. The last section equates geometrically rationalized town planning with cleaner, more orderly, and happier societies. Corbusier writes that the plan determines the spectator's perception of, on one hand, rhythm, volume, and coherence or "of shapelessness, of poverty, of disorder, of wilfulness," on the other. Town planning must "repudiate the existing lay-out of our towns" and embrace the efficiency and economy of skyscrapers surrounded by parks (i.e., towers in the park). Corbusier ends by presenting his designs for such a city.

== Reception ==
As early as 1922, German translations of the original L'Esprit nouveau articles began finding a receptive audience that included Walter Gropius. Beginning in 1923, Corbusier undertook an extensive marketing campaign for the book that included advertisements in L'Esprit nouveau and the distribution of emphatically worded pamphlets. Two reviews appeared in the December 1923 issue of L'Esprit nouveau following the book's publication. The writer Paul Budry disagreed with many of the examples but called it "constructive" while Ozenfant was more thorough in his praise. The book sold unexpectedly well and a second edition was promptly issued in 1924 with a new preface, though the first edition plates had already been destroyed. Full translations soon appeared in German (1926), English (1927), Japanese (1929), and Spanish (1939), with many to follow, especially after 1980. French industrialist Henri Frugès commissioned Corbusier to design (ultimately ill-fated) housing estates at Pessac and Lège soon after reading it. By 1929, the book had become "the canonical text for at least a generation" of Parisian architects. Beyond Paris, architects and architectural historians including Gropius, Frank Lloyd Wright, J.J.P. Oud, Buckminster Fuller, Josep Lluis Sert, Henry-Russell Hitchcock, and Kenzō Tange praised the book. Not everyone embraced it, however; in 1928, Edwin Lutyens said that the houses Corbusier proposed were only fit for "robots without eyes."

Architectural historian Colin Rowe used it as a basis to compare Corbusier's work to that of Renaissance architect Andrea Palladio. Reyner Banham extensively discusses the book's importance in Theory and Design in the First Machine Age and parodies its organization in Los Angeles: The Architecture of Four Ecologies. At the end of his introduction to the 2007 Goodman translation, Cohen asserts that its impact has "undoubtedly been even greater" than Corbusier's buildings.

Architectural writers have endlessly riffed on Toward an Architecture in the title or subtitle of their own work, particularly in polemical writings like manifestos. This includes Henri Lefebvre's 1973 Toward an Architecture of Enjoyment and Allan Jacobs and Donald Appleyard's highly cited 1982/7 article "Toward an Urban Design Manifesto," as well as the subtitle of Paul Katz's 1994 The New Urbanism: Toward an Architecture of Community, and a 2019 monograph on Peter Eisenman.

In 2025, the Museum für Gestaltung (Museum of Design) in Zürich hosted an exhibition in the Pavillon Le Corbusier for the book's 100th anniversary entitled "Vers une architecture': Reflections." The centennial also garnered coverage considering and affirming its influence on architecture in various design and popular publications, with architecture critic Rowan Moore writing that Vers remains "the most influential book on the design of buildings since Vitruvius wrote his De Architectura."

== English Translations ==
The book was originally translated into English in 1927 as Towards a New Architecture by British architect and artist Frederick Etchells. This translation has been controversial due to its poetic writing style and alterations to the text. For instance, Etchells translates le volume ("volume") as "mass" and omits a paragraph from the Maisons en série essay. In 2007, The Getty Research Institute published a new translation by John Goodman with the more accurate title Toward an Architecture. It is a more faithful to the original text and contains a lengthy introduction from architectural historian Jean-Louis Cohen. While acknowledging Etchells's lack of translational rigor, Frampton complains that the precision of Goodman's version lacks the poetic quality of the original French. Goodman's translation works from the 1924 second French edition, whereas Etchells used the thirteenth French edition.

== See also ==
- Le Corbusier's Five Points of Architecture

== Sources ==
- Le Corbusier. Toward an Architecture. Translated by John Goodman. Los Angeles: Getty Research Institute, 2007
- Le Corbusier. Towards a New Architecture. Translated by Frederick Etchells. London: J. Rodker, 1931. Reprint New York: Dover Publications, 1985.
- 1929 French edition digitized at Bibliothèque Nationale de France
