= B. C. Holland =

Chicago art dealer

- Died: 1994-12-29 (72 years)
- Education: Drake University, University of Illinois
- Occupations: Art Dealer and Gallery Owner
- Spouse: Claire Barancik
- Father: Charles Holland
- Military career
- Allegiance: United States
- Branch: United States Army
- Rank: Bomber pilot
- Unit: 8th Army Air Corps
- Wars: World War II

Bud C. Holland was a Chicago art dealer, who owned B. C. Holland Gallery.

== Early life and education ==
Holland was the son of antique dealer Charles Holland, from Chicago. He attended Drake University and the University of Illinois. He fought in World War II as an 8th Army Air Corps combat pilot. He married Helyn Goldenberg.

== Art dealing ==
Holland and Noah Goldowsky founded the Holland-Goldowsky Gallery in 1957. It held exhibitions and sold artwork for Chicago artists and many artists of the New York School. Holland bought out his partner and renamed the gallery the B. C. Holland Gallery in August 1961. The gallery closed upon Holland's death in 1994.

Holland was friend and advisor to the art collectors Ann and Jim Christensen and both a seller and donor of artworks by artists such as Amédée Ozenfant, Le Corbusier, Jasper Johns and Egon Schiele to the Art Institute of Chicago. He hosted Chicago artist Joan Mitchell's first solo exhibition. In 1988 the Chicago Tribune described him as the "dean of Chicago art dealers".

Holland died in December 1994, at the age of 72. He was survived by his wife Claire, children and grandchildren.
