= Yellow Manifesto =

1928 Catalan avant-garde manifesto

- Created: March 1928
- Signatories: Salvador Dalí, Sebastià Gasch, Lluís Montanyà
- Media type: Printed manifesto
- Subject: Avant-garde art and Catalan culture

The Yellow Manifesto (Manifest Groc), also known as the Catalan Anti-Art Manifesto (Manifest antiartístic català), was an avant-garde manifesto published in Barcelona in March 1928 and signed by the painter Salvador Dalí, the art critic Sebastià Gasch and the literary critic Lluís Montanyà. Printed in black on yellow paper, from which its popular name derived, it attacked the Catalan cultural establishment, particularly the legacy of Noucentisme, and championed modernity, the machine age, cinema, sport, jazz and the European artistic avant-garde.

The Fundació Joan Miró has described it as the most important manifesto of the historical avant-garde in Catalonia and possibly in Spain.

== Background ==
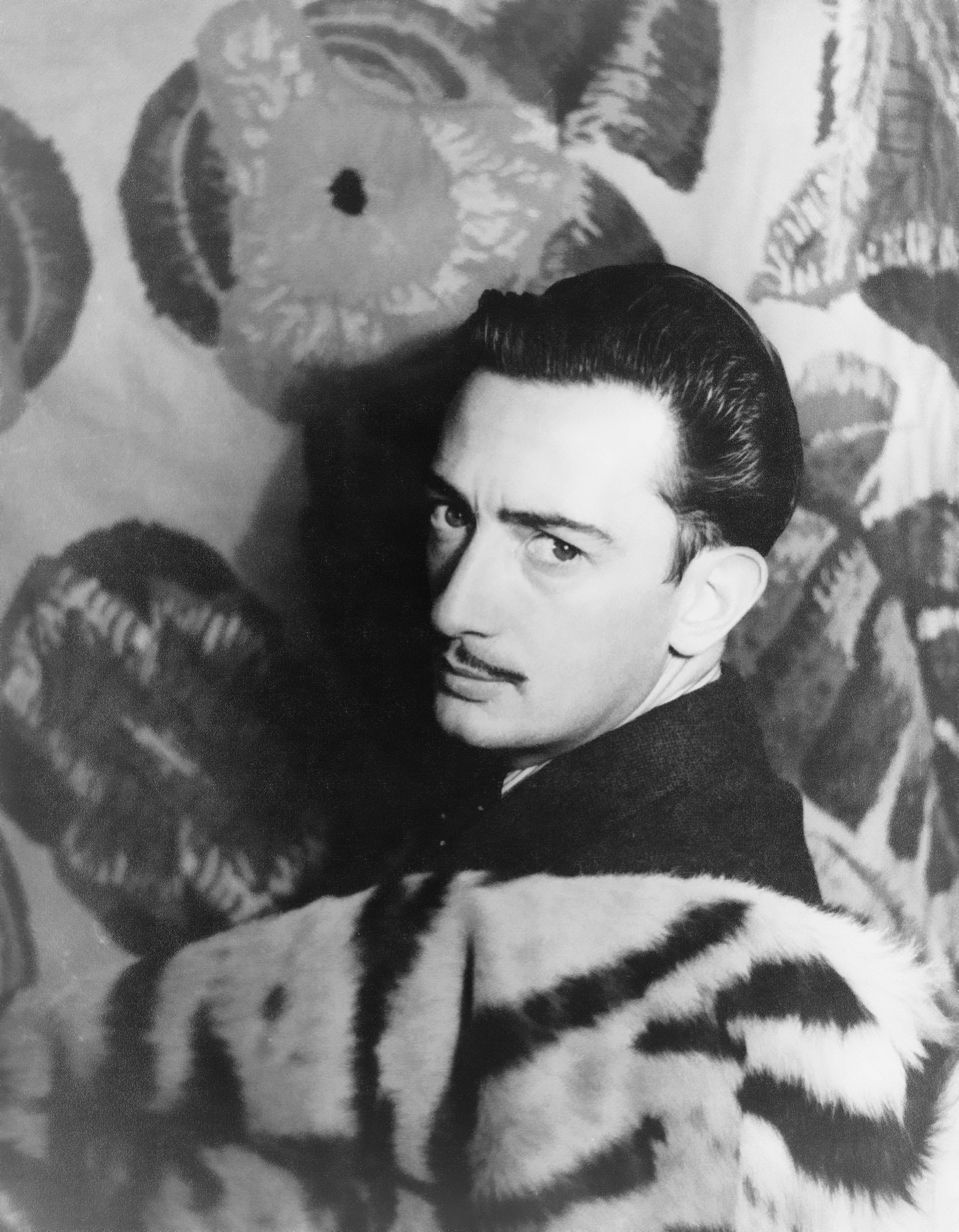
Salvador Dalí, one of the three signatories of the Yellow Manifesto, photographed in 1939 by Carl Van Vechten.

The manifesto emerged from the Catalan avant-garde milieu of the late 1920s, in which Dalí, Gasch and Montanyà contributed to the Sitges-based journal L'Amic de les Arts. The Catalan avant-garde of the period drew on international movements including Futurism, Cubism and Dada, as well as the ideas promoted by L'Esprit Nouveau and Le Corbusier.

The manifesto was conceived as a direct challenge to what its authors regarded as the cultural conservatism of contemporary Catalonia. In particular, it attacked Noucentisme, the cultural movement that had promoted classicism, civic order and Mediterranean cultural ideals during the preceding decades. The Fundació Joan Miró has emphasized Dalí's prominent role in the preparation of the text, of which several preliminary versions survive. The Biblioteca de Catalunya preserves typescript drafts with corrections as well as correspondence from Dalí relating to its preparation.

== Content ==
Addressed explicitly to young Catalans, the manifesto adopted an intentionally provocative and confrontational tone. It denounced what its authors considered the stagnation of Catalan cultural life and rejected both sentimental traditionalism and the classicist legacy of Noucentisme.

Among its targets were the playwright Àngel Guimerà, the Orfeó Català, La Nova Revista, the Fundació Bernat Metge and other representatives of established Catalan culture. It mocked the idealization of classical Greece and criticized what the signatories regarded as the artificial classicism of contemporary cultural institutions.

In opposition to this tradition, the manifesto celebrated modern life, including machinery, cinema, sport, jazz, advertising, industrial design and modern transport. It also invoked artists, writers and architects associated with the international avant-garde, including Pablo Picasso, Giorgio de Chirico, Hans Arp, Constantin Brâncuși, Tristan Tzara, André Breton, Le Corbusier, Federico García Lorca and Joan Miró.

Its ideas combined elements inherited from Cubism and Futurism with Dadaist attitudes and the technological modernism associated with L'Esprit Nouveau. Dalí, Gasch and Montanyà presented technological and popular modernity not merely as artistic subjects but as evidence of a new cultural sensibility.

== Publication and reception ==
The manifesto was printed in Barcelona in March 1928 by Fills de F. Sabater as a single large sheet measuring approximately 39 by 56 centimetres. A surviving copy held by the Biblioteca de Catalunya bears the stamp of the Barcelona Civil Government's press censorship office.

The manifesto attracted considerable attention in the Catalan press. Newspapers and cultural journals discussed it extensively, often critically; the writer Carles Soldevila was among its most prominent critics in La Publicitat. Its circulation extended beyond Catalonia: the Granada-based avant-garde journal Gallo reproduced the manifesto in full, and it received a favourable response in some Spanish avant-garde circles.

Sebastià Gasch later recalled the large number of both positive and hostile reactions generated by the manifesto.

The polemical project had a brief continuation in Fulls Grocs ("Yellow Sheets"), a publication produced by Gasch, Montanyà and Guillem Díaz-Plaja. Only one issue appeared, on 15 December 1929.

== Legacy ==
The Yellow Manifesto became one of the best-known texts of the Catalan historical avant-garde. The Biblioteca de Catalunya considers its publication, together with the later creation of the GATCPAC, among the high points of the early avant-garde movements in Catalonia.

Scholar Núria Perpinyà has examined the manifesto's degree of radicalism and originality, its relationship with contemporary artistic movements and the extent to which the aesthetic values it advocated later entered mainstream Catalan culture. Carmen García de la Rasilla has likewise situated the document within Dalí's broader use of provocation and scandal as components of his early avant-garde practice.

In 1998, an English translation of the manifesto appeared in The Collected Writings of Salvador Dalí, edited and translated by Haim N. Finkelstein and published by Cambridge University Press.

In 2004, as part of the celebrations marking the centenary of Dalí's birth, the Fundació Joan Miró in Barcelona organized the exhibition The Yellow Manifesto. Dalí, Gasch, Montanyà and anti-art, curated by art historian Joan M. Minguet Batllori. The exhibition examined the document's preparation, sources and public reception. An extensive exhibition catalogue was also published.
