= "Five Points of a New Architecture" =

Architecture manifesto by Le Corbusier (1927)

"Five Points of a New Architecture" (Les cinq points d'une architecture nouvelle, sometimes referred to as the "Five Points of Architecture") is a short essay written by the noted modernist architect Le Corbusier. Drawing on his earlier design work and writing, the manifesto attempts to elucidate the architectural possibilities of newly-developed modern construction methods.

It was first given as a lecture at Weissenhof Siedlung in 1927 and a revised text was published in the first volume of Corbusier's Oeuvre complete in 1929. By 1935, Corbusier had softened the views embodied in the Five Points, embracing elements of the vernacular in his work.

== Summary ==
The essay is composed of a list of five architectural elements or principles and a short discussion of each. Corbusier claims these "in no way relate to aesthetic fantasies[,] but concern architectural facts that imply an entirely new kind of building." The five points are the supports (expressed on the ground floor as Piloti), roof gardens, free designing of the ground-plan (a free plan), horizontal windows (the ribbon window), and the free design of the facade.

Each element is related to the affordances of reinforced concrete structures. Point 1, supports expressed as a grid of columns made of reinforced concrete with individual foundations, allows the elevation of the ground floor away from "dampness," replaced with a garden. Reinforced concrete construction creates a flat roof that "demands ... systematic utilization for domestic purposes," i.e., a roof garden or terrace (Point 2). The garden in turn provides the structure constant temperature and humidity. Columns also provide flexibility for the interior layout (Point 3) due to the absence of immovable load-bearing walls. With "the intermediate ceilings" (floor slabs), columns delineate the edges of horizontal windows (Point 4). Such windows provide better interior illumination than "stilted vertical windows." Finally, extending the floor like a "balcony all around the building" allows fenestration patterns that are unrelated to the interior partitioning or structure {Point 5; see curtain wall (architecture)}. The essay closes by stating that standardized, industrially-produced building elements will free the architect to concentrate on the skillful resolution of the architectural program.

== Villa Savoye ==
Villa Savoye in Poissy (1931)

The Villa Savoye is arguably Le Corbusier's most significant contribution to modernist architecture and epitomizes all principles of his Five Points of Modern Architecture. Situated in Poissy, it was constructed from 1928–1931 and commissioned by Pierre and Eugénie Savoye, who granted Le Corbusier and his collaborator Pierre Jeanneret unrestricted freedom in its design.

The pilotis elevate the structure from the ground, allowing for automobiles to drive underneath through a sweeping enclosure corresponding to the turning radius of a car as it curves around the house to afford direct entrance. The placement of the columns are predominately practical, organized in a structurally efficient configuration. Some arrangements are deployed to create subdivisions within rooms, promoting free design of the ground plan. The horizontal ribboned windows are supported by toothpick pilotis, surrounding all sides of the façade, and their intentional positioning directs the viewer's gaze to the horizon, limiting visibility of the top and bottom of the landscape; while also referencing an abstract form that obscures the diverse functionality and interior behind the façade. The roof terrace flows seamlessly from Madame Savoye's bedroom suite, constituting the culmination of the free plan and collapsing distinctions of interior and exterior space, while providing sweeping views of the pastoral visage. The white façade is open on all sides, with no definitive back or front, maximizing the site's hilltop location, so that distant views are visible from any side, since Le Corbusier envisioned the residence as an escape from the preoccupations of urban life in Paris.

The spatial properties of the free design, particularly, the circulation of ramps and stairs that flow through the house, have been extensively examined, as expressions of Le Corbusier's notion of the "promenade architecturale". Essentially, a scripted path of movement, offering diversity and complexity of varying views, with some aspects intentionally aimed towards the exterior, and others reflecting the interior of the space. Further, the spiral stairs and the multi-storey ramps ascend in both concord and contrast of one other, as the tilted plane of the ramp connects various levels in an uninterrupted path, concluding outside at a curved solarium situated above the terrace. On the other hand, the stairs incrementally disrupt Le Corbusier's preferred direction of movement, contradicting the "promenade."

The house was plagued with mechanical and structural issues, as its impracticality resulted in inhabitability. The Savoye's complaints were well documented but largely unaddressed, citing pervasive leaking and flooding throughout the site. However, Le Corbusier did not formally recognize many of these functional defects, and the space continued to be afflicted with problems, with the extensive leakage eventually causing the owners to abandon habitation around 1939. Paradoxically, though the architect famously declared "a house is machine for living in" (French: "une maison est une machine-à-habiter", cf. Machine aesthetic), the Villa Savoye became a categorically unliveable construction. Apart from brief occupation by German and then American forces during World War II, it remained mostly unoccupied and in derelict condition, until an international preservation campaign was launched in the late 1950s. Upon learning of the structure's potential demolition, Le Corbusier utilized his global prominence to garner worldwide support from influential figures and institutions, including the Museum of Modern Art and Time magazine, eventually contributing to the successful campaign. In 2016, it was inscribed as a UNESCO World Heritage Site, reinforcing its architectural notability, and confirming that while it was an imperfect residence, it does serve as a showpiece for Le Corbusier's creative aesthetic, primarily as the physical embodiment of his manifesto, while also being the last project that personified all five tenets of the Five Points of Architecture.

== Villa Cook ==
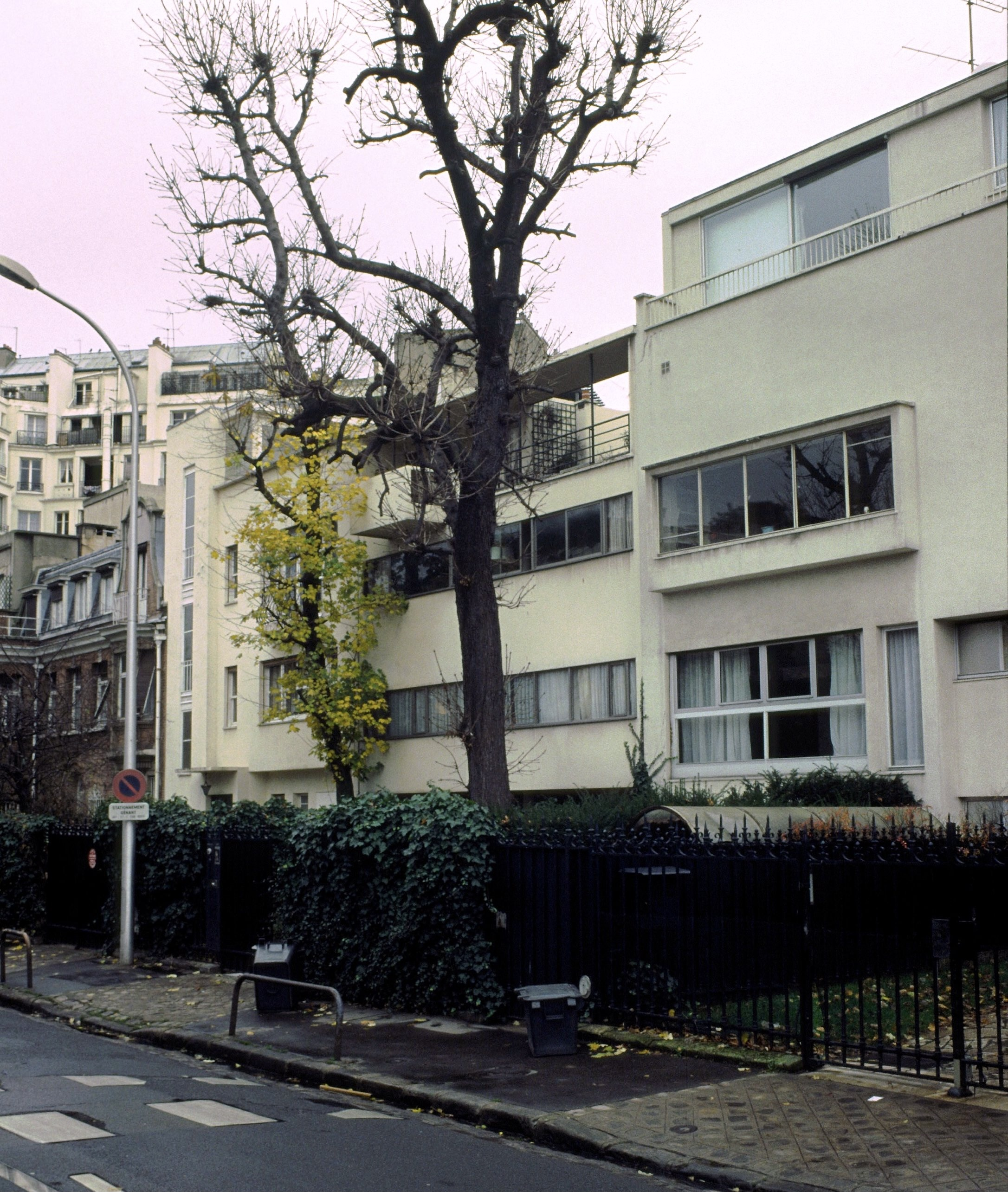
Villa Cook in Boulogne-sur-Seine (1926)

The Villa Cook (Maison Cook) is recognized as one of Le Corbusier's first projects that canonically demonstrated his Five Points of Modern Architecture. Located in Boulogne-sur-Seine, it was built in 1926 by Le Corbusier and Pierre Jeanneret; and commissioned by American journalist William Cook and his French wife, Jeanne.

Le Corbusier deemed the house as "the true cubic house" (French: la vraie maison cubique), as its constructional plan originated from a square, rendering its cubic form. Round pilotis elevate the main building from the ground, allowing for a driveway leading to the enclosed garage; correspondingly, the main entrance is also underneath the overall structure. The free design of the façade enables all perspectives of the building to be viewed concurrently, and conceals any visible supporting structures. Striped sliding windows surround the length of the exterior; and the roof garden embodies a natural progression of previous open floor plans. The house is divided into four quadrants, determined by a column grid, separating key living areas that are situated on the top floor and connect to the roof garden, the most easily accessible external area; while the downstairs bedrooms subvert the traditional vertical organization of a residence, also clearly demonstrating the free plan. This vertical configuration was partially due to the constraints of an urban environment, with limited external dimensions, it was logical to conceive of a stackable cube, separated into four levels and bookended by an underside entrance and a large roof garden. The centrepiece of the residence is the roof terrace, spherically enlarged to afford distant views of the Bois de Boulogne parklands, serving as a refuge from its congested surroundings.

Villa Cook's promenade architecturale is orchestrated with a clear beginning, middle and dramatic finale, consisting of the sweeping roof garden. However, the majority of the structure does not seek to integrate interior space and outdoor landscape, but rather, more tightly obscures its spatial arrangements from all sides of the façade, as the ribboned windows and flat roof conceal the double-height living room. Additionally, as the focal central column divides interior bays into even numbers, the path of movement is less varied, resulting in a more logical hierarchy of motion that ascends through a tight and discontinuous axis.

== Carpenter Center ==
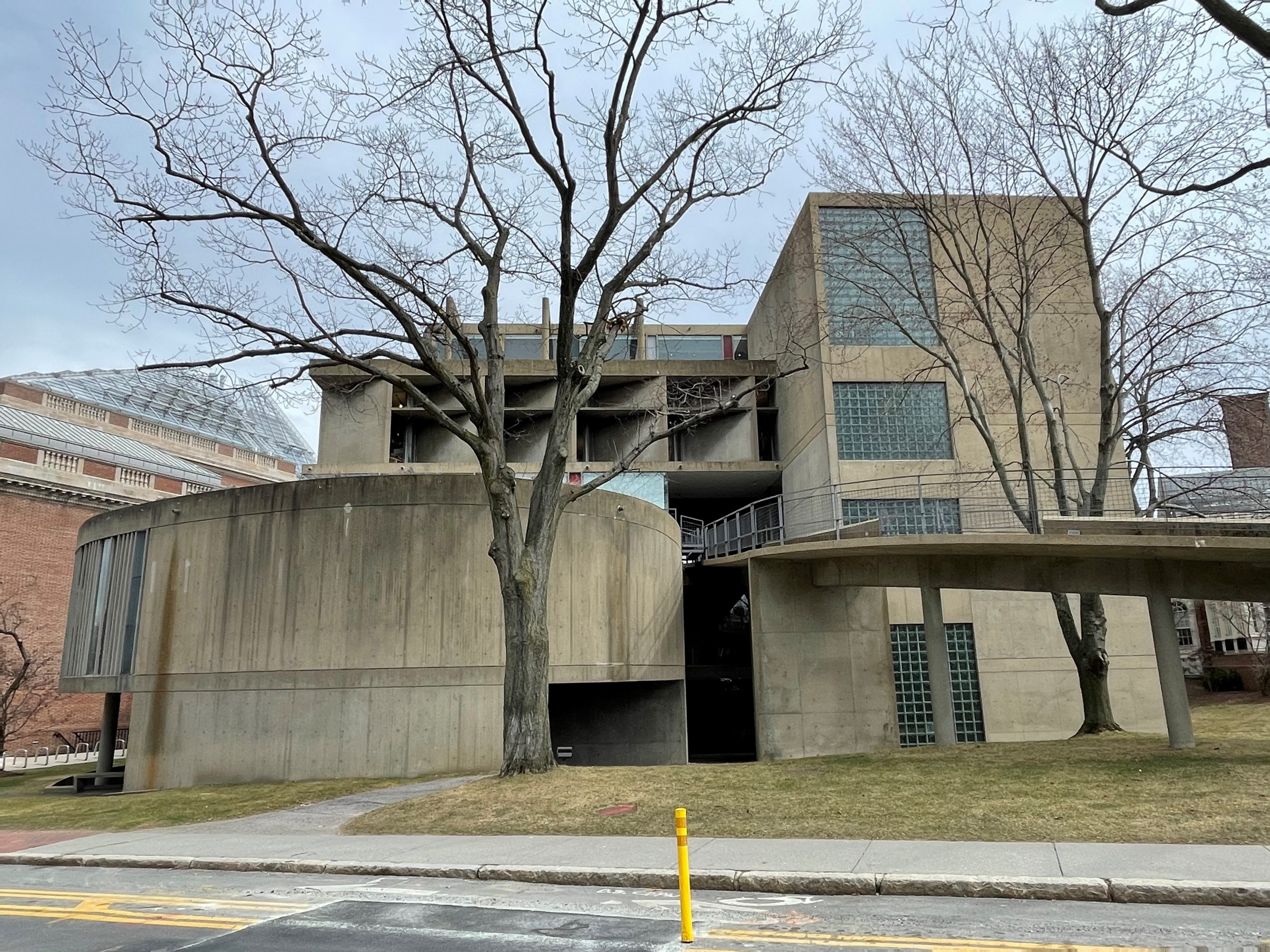
The Carpenter Center at Harvard University, Cambridge (1963)

The Carpenter Center for the Visual Arts at Harvard University was Le Corbusier's only project within the United States. Completed in 1963, it personified his earlier modernist works, and one of the last physical embodiments of the Five Points of Modern Architecture. Designed as a collaboration with Chilean architect, Guillermo Jullian de la Fuente, it was conceived to be the amalgamation of arts, a site where architecture would coalesce with visual arts and film.

The pilotis of the building elevates the structure, and despite their breadth and depth, they produce a low, nearly buried space in the foreground of the building. The frontal façades generate a tension across the walls, as the organization of construction appear both systematic and anarchic. The windows are no longer ribboned stripes, but large triple glazed panels that depict the studios and galleries inside, and roof gardens sit atop two curved studios situated on both sides of the central main ramp. The free design of the plan is supported by the large pilotis, offering greater flexibility in utility, enabling open creative spaces, as well as multiple arrangements to accommodate exhibitions or cinema screenings.

The main promenade architecturale is offered by the ramp running through the middle of the building, following a mostly external passage that surrounds both the front and back of the site. An internal promenade is demonstrated by another pathway, following the downward trajectory of the pilotis and then upwards through the stairs. Further, a delineated line of movement is facilitated by the central ramp, providing a gradual ascension that seamlessly links the interior spaces, while offering passersby a glimpse into the studios and galleries. This was intentionally conceptualized by Le Corbusier, who envisioned the Center serving as a primary pathway connecting the historic Harvard Yard to the more contemporary buildings across campus. Fundamentally, by combining his earlier architectural practices with revised elements from the Five Points, the Carpenter Center embodies the synthesis of Le Corbusier's previous concepts and newer compositions, resulting in a sophisticated configuration of diverse possibilities.

== Criticism ==
The conventions of the Five Points of Architecture are not always practical in application. After the completion of Villa Savoye, Le Corbusier began to stray from the principles articulated in his manifesto, preferring instead, structures that were more harmonious with nature. This ideological departure was largely founded on an inclination towards more vernacular architecture and utilization of natural resources, promoting the importance of nature in all practices, and determining that all forms should originate from nature. Evidently, this was a shift from the more Purist designs of Five Points, and Le Corbusier sought to reconcile his five classifications with greater flexibility, creating a fusion between mechanistic order and natural chaos.

Certain principles of the Five Points proved incongruent to actual habitation, with designs not holistically considering everyday living. The physical deterioration of Villa Savoye was largely due to Le Corbusier's inattention to the needs of his clients, prioritizing aesthetic ambition over domestic consumption. Additionally, the expansive glass windows can cause overheating during warmer seasons, and substantial heat loss in colder climates. Since they wrap around the entire structure, there is no reprieve from their harsh impacts. As a consequence of the extensive water leakage and inclement weather complications, the villa required frequent repairs and became uninhabitable. Yet it still served as a demonstration of the architect's visionary prowess.

== Legacy ==
Le Corbusier's influence is undeniable, and his Five Points of Modern Architecture have served as guidelines in many architectural infrastructures. Elements of the Five Points have been featured in numerous contemporary designs, reinforcing the lasting heritage of his original manifesto. The core ideas of this rationalization still serve as inspiration and foundation for many contemporary architects, who incorporate Le Corbusier's framework into their projects.

Corresponding architectural influences can be found in the works of architects such as Mies van der Rohe, particularly in the Farnsworth House; as well as the Glass House by Philip Johnson. These much works have shaped Modernist residential architecture, tracing Le Corbusier's enduring impact to the architectural landscape of the modern era.
