= Machine aesthetic =

Trait of artistic and architectural styles

Le Corbusier aimed to express machine aesthetic in Villa Savoye's International Style

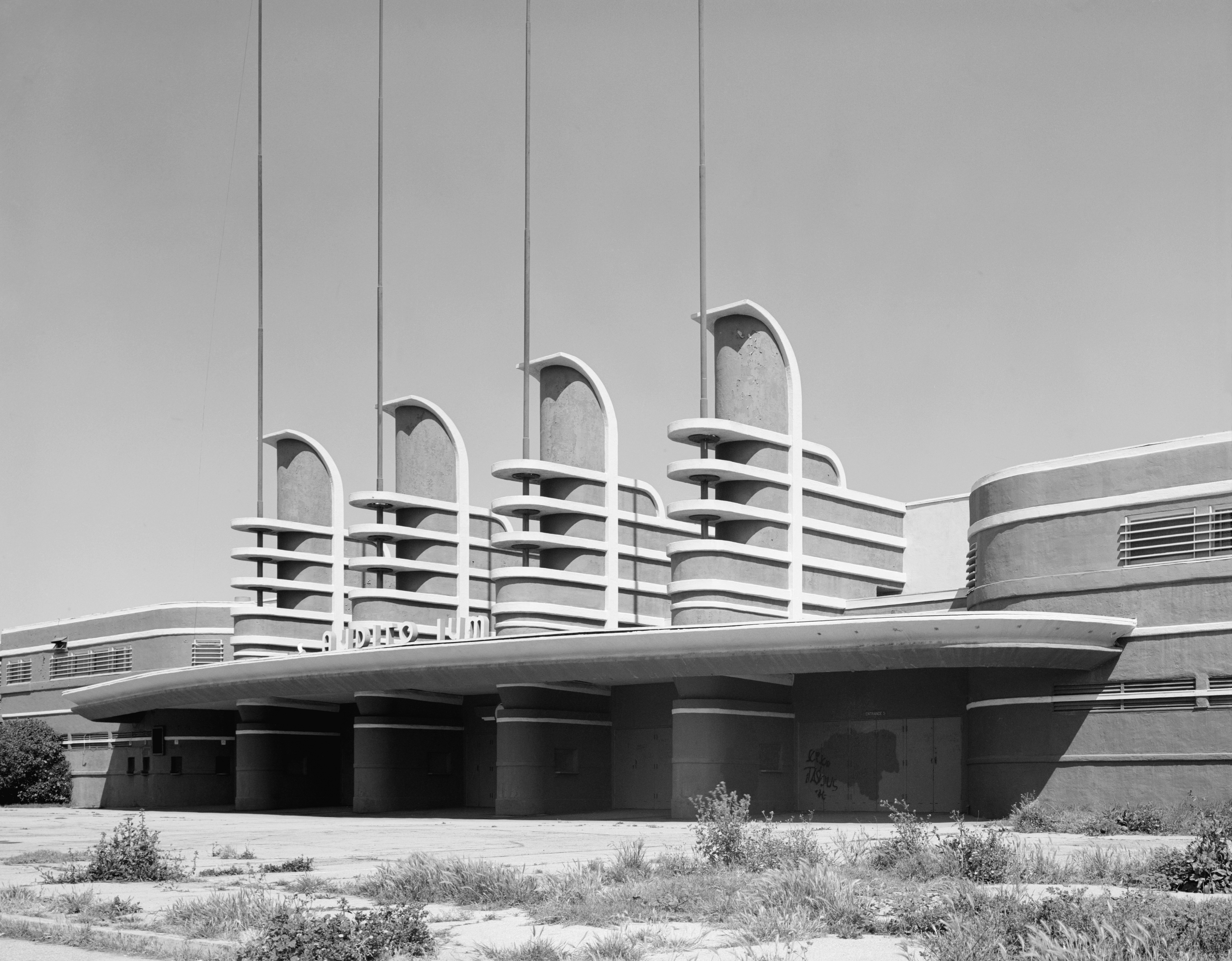
Pan-Pacific Auditorium in Streamline Moderne style with towers shaped after airplane wings (1972 photo of an abandoned building)

The machine aesthetic label is used in architecture and other arts to describe works that either draw the inspiration from industrialization with its mechanized mass production or use elements resembling structures of complex machines (ships, planes, etc.) for the sake of appearance. As an example of the latter, buildings in the International Modernism style frequently used horizontal strips of metal-framed windows crossing the smooth walls to imitate an ocean liner in a deliberate violation of the "truth to materials" principle (as the walls were actually made of bricks).

Machine aesthetic is neither an art style, nor an art movement in itself, but a common trait shared by multiple movements of the first three decades of the 20th century (so called First Machine Age), including French purism, Dutch De Stijl, Russian suprematism and productivism, German constructivism (Bauhaus), and American precisionism. With the notable exception of dadaists, most adherents of machine aesthetic were generally adoring the industrial development, although sometimes with hesitation: "this shouldn't be beautiful, but it is" (Elsie Driggs on her smokestacks- and smoke-filled landscape of Pittsburgh steel mills).

At its heyday, machine aesthetic was truly the spirit of the age, Zeitgeist, that affected the mood of artists across movements as diverse as realism, dadaism, and futurism, changing the minds like the (contemporaneous) Jazz Age did.

== Roots ==
J. J. P. Oud already in the 1919 declared that "the motor car [and the] machine ... correspond more closely to the socio-aesthetic tendencies of our age and the future than do the contemporary manifestations of architecture", the new aesthetical emotions thus ought to be evoked through "the grace of the machine".

Fernand Léger in the 1924 penned a declaration on "The Machine Aesthetic", stating that the humanity is starting to live in the "geometrical order" and called for "the architecture of the mechanical".

Theo van Doesburg in his 1926 manifesto "The End of Art" explicitly argued that aestheticism kills the creativity, and the architects should learn from non-artistic objects:

Let us refresh ourselves with things that are not Art: the bathroom, the W. C., the bathtub, the telescope, the bicycle, the auto, the subways, the flatiron. There are many people who know how to make such good unartistic things.

— van Doesburg, "The End of Art"

Other notable declarations of adoration towards the machines included Filippo Marinetti's "Mechanical and Geometrical Splendor and Sensitivity Toward Numbers" (1914), Gino Severini's "Machinery" (1922), Nikolai Tarabukin's "From the Easel to the Machine" (1923), Kurt Ewald's "The Beauty of Machines" (1925-1926), Walter Gropius' "Where Artists and Technicians Meet" (1925-1926).

Machine aesthetic can be considered as a backlash against the expressionism. At the time, art critics suggested that the abstract art was splitting into two streams, an evolution of expressionism, termed "non-geometrical" by Alfred Barr (who placed the machine aesthetic into the center of Barr's diagram), and "geometrical", a continuation of constructivism. Walter Gropius contrasted the "technological product" made by "sober mind" and "work of art created by passion". The groups associated with machine aesthetic sometimes exhibited a strong rejection of expressionist self-indulgence: "I have more faith [in the machine] than in the longhaired gentleman with a floppy cravat" (Fernand Léger, 1924).

=== De Stijl ===
Van Doesburg had founded a De Stijl journal in 1917 and published it together with Piet Mondrian, Oud, Rietveld until 1931. De Stijl was unabashed in its "celebration of the machine" and proclaiming the aesthetic values of the industrial production.

De Stijl community included painters (most notably Mondrian) and sculptors (Constantin Brâncuși). Composer George Antheil had created the Ballet mécanique, "the first piece of music that has been composed OUT OF and FOR machines, ON EARTH", that was used as a score to a "film without scenario" by Léger. The music was played by an orchestra including primarily the percussion instruments, but also included the sounds of a bell, a siren, and an airplane propeller.

By the 1922 De Stijl exchanged ideas with the art's opposite take on the industrial revolution, Dadaism. Dadaists found chaos and absurdity where machine aesthetic found order and beauty, but both sides agreed on a need for a "new synthesis".

== Expressions ==
=== Architecture and applied arts ===
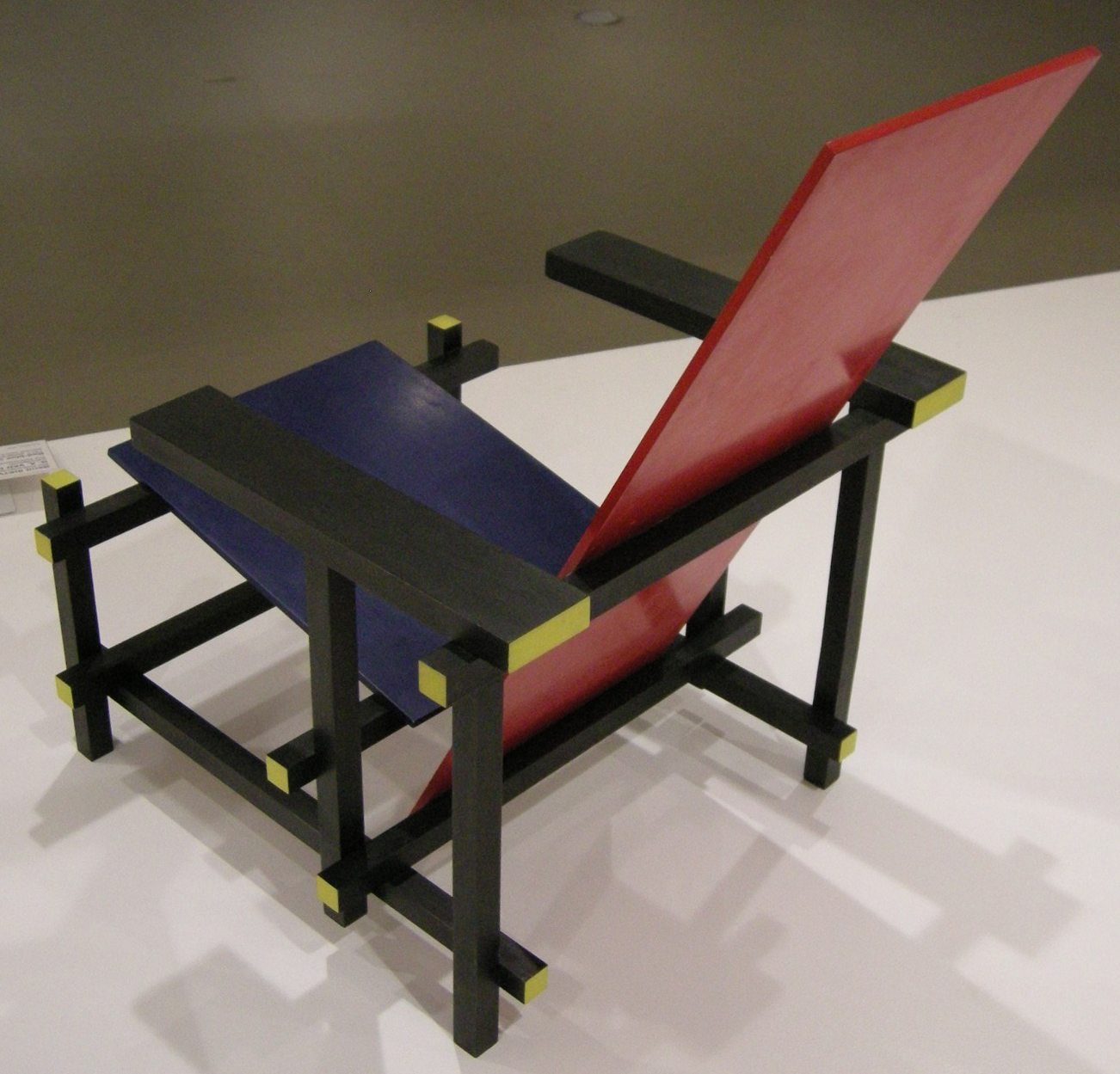
Interlocking components of the Red and Blue chair

The machine aesthetic label was born in the beginning of the 20th century, when the newly created machines embodied the purity of the function. Architects were fascinated by the possibilities of the clean geometric forms and smooth surfaces enabled by the new construction techniques. The adherents of machine aesthetic called for elimination of traditional for architecture (and furniture design) structural distinctions between load and support. For example, in the Red and Blue Chair (1917) the (red) back plays the role of the load (supported by a crossbar underneath the seat) and provides support for the arms at the same time. For buildings even differences between inside and outside became minor: since the walls no longer needed to carry the load (with the support often provided by the steel frame), the inside space can be made almost as open as the outside one.

==== Architectural examples ====
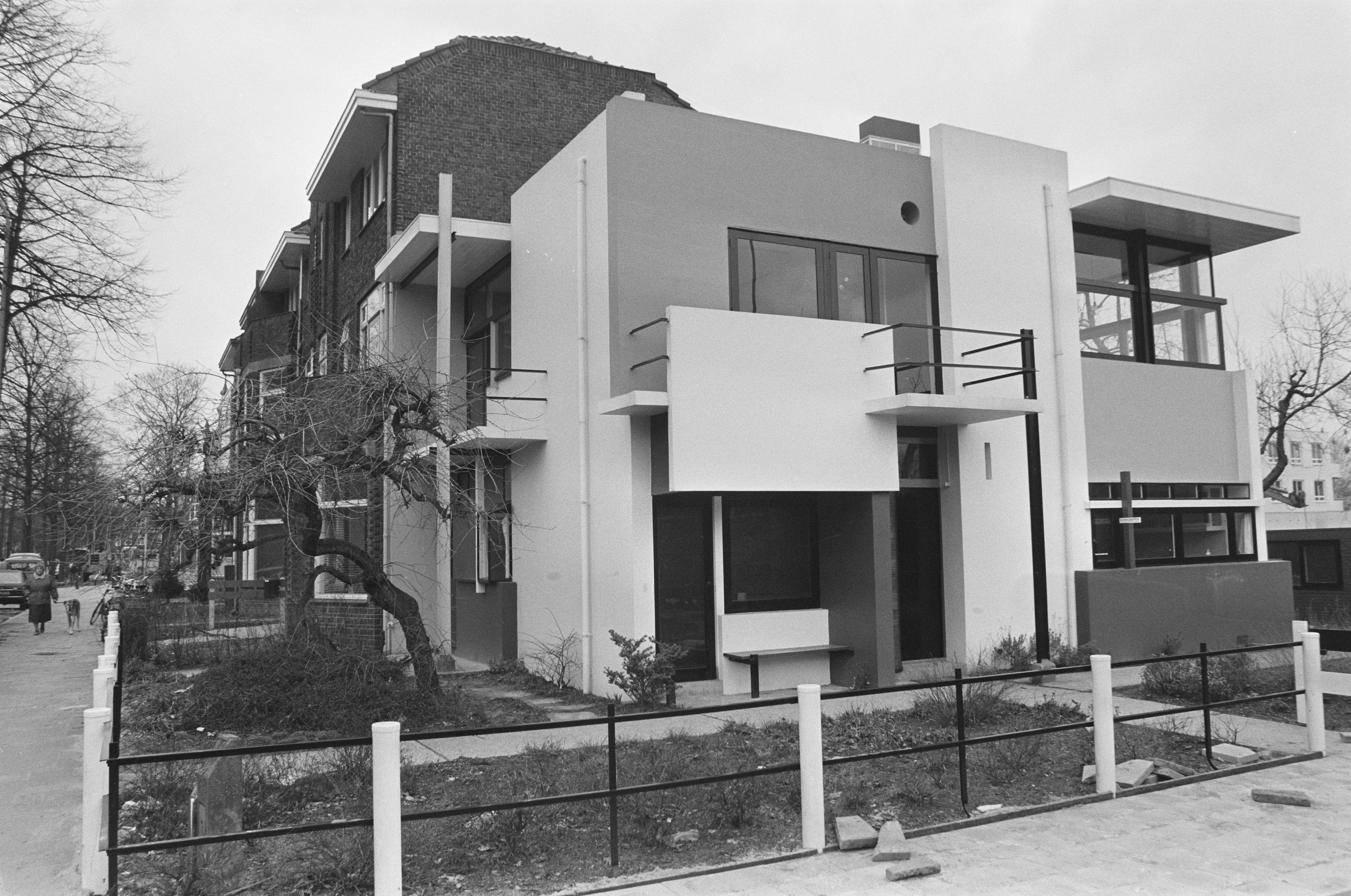
Schröder House

Schröder House in Utrecht (Gerrit Rietveld, 1924) is a combination of interlocking planes expanding outside (cantilevered) and movable walls partitioning the open space inside. The architect was trying to avoid an appearance of a monolithic mass.

=== Visual arts ===
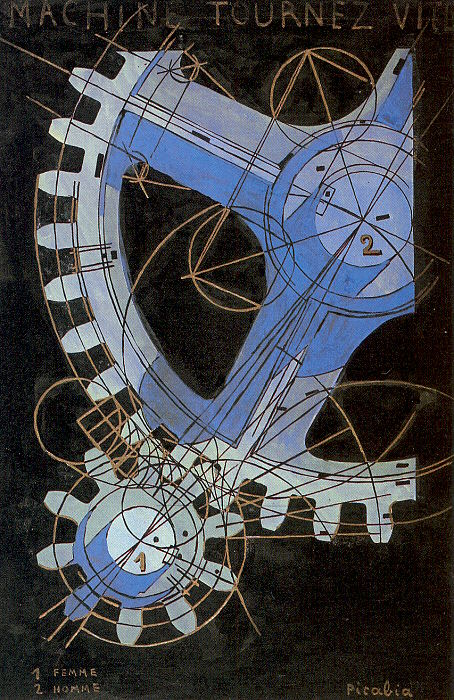
Machine Turns Quickly (Francis Picabia, 1916)

On the most basic level, the machine aesthetic was manifested through depictions of the machines, sometimes using techniques alluding to their textures. For example, Charles Sheeler in his precisionist works showing off the factory complexes used glossy finishes and crisp lines to imitate the surface of instruments. Some artists, like sculptor Jacob Epstein in his "The Rock Drill", viewed the machine as a mindless and ruthless monster.

Constructivists viewed themselves as technicians who constructed and assembled the art pieces, rather than chiseling or painting them, their use of drastically unconventional art materials is sometimes called a culture of materials. Vladimir Tatlin in particular considered himself an "inventor" imitating factory processes when putting together three-dimensional pieces made of industrial materials like sheet metal.

=== Performing arts ===
Regularity and rhythm of the machine operation can be compared to music and ballet, hence the repeated use of the title Ballet mécanique in different genres. Oskar Schlemmer at Bauhaus had created a few ballets where dancers performed fast and repetitive motions of pistons and cogs (evoking "mechanthropomorphism"), with costumes and sets imitating the engine parts on a grand scale. Drawing a comparison between the body and machine, the mechanistic motions of dancers were in contrast to fluid and graceful moves of the traditional ballet.

=== Literature ===
Blaise Cendrars in his La prose du Transsibérien et de la Petite Jehanne de France about the journey aboard the Trans-Siberian Express alluded to the movements of the train.

=== Music ===
In the context of popular music, machine aesthetics refers to musical expressions that evoke the sonic characteristics or behaviors of machines. This concept is distinct from machine music, which denotes music produced using technology such as synthesizers, drum machines, and digital audio workstations. Instead, machine aesthetics encompasses both electronic music and live performances where human musicians emulate the qualities of machines on conventional instruments. This distinction also separates the concept from opaque mediation, a term coined by Ragnhild Brøvig to describe production where technological intervention is audibly distinct; while opaque mediation relies on the presence of technology, machine aesthetics can be achieved purely through human performance techniques that mimic technological effects.

Scholars Brøvig and Stevenson apply rhetorical theorist Barry Brummett's framework of machine aesthetics—categorized into mechtech, electrotech, and chaotech—to analyze these musical forms.

Mechtech aesthetics are associated with the industrial machines of the early twentieth century, characterized by rigid functionality, repetition, and physical labor. In music, this aesthetic manifests through hyper-precision, quantization, and looping.

- Rhythmic rigidity: This style mimics the "grid" of early drum machines and step sequencers. While electronic dance music (EDM) often utilizes quantization to achieve this, live drummers such as Deantoni Parks have developed techniques to replicate this robotic consistency manually.
- Looping: Hip hop production relies heavily on looped samples. Live ensembles, such as the Brandt Brauer Frick Ensemble and Abstract Orchestra, emulate this aesthetic by performing repetitive, loop-like phrases with high precision on acoustic instruments, mimicking the "chopped" and repetitive nature of digital samplers.

Electrotech aesthetics correspond to the electronic age, emphasizing complexity, the blurring of human–machine boundaries, and the extension of human capability. Unlike the rigid order of mechtech, electrotech embraces ambiguity and flexibility.

- Seasick grooves: A primary manifestation of electrotech in music is the "seasick" groove, popularized by hip hop producer J Dilla. These rhythms utilize micro-timing deviations that purposefully drift off the musical grid, creating a loose feel that challenges traditional quantization.
- Live emulation: Bands such as Underground Canopy perform these computerized, off-grid rhythms on live instruments, intentionally playing beats early or late to create the tension associated with unquantized digital production.

Chaotech aesthetics celebrate the decay, failure, and malfunction of technology. It finds artistic value in the "glitch" and the breakdown of machinery.

- Glitches: Digital errors, skipping CDs, and distortion are central to genres like glitch music.
- Acoustic emulation: Acoustic groups like GoGo Penguin have incorporated chaotech by physically playing "glitches" on their instruments. For example, in the track "One Percent", the band replicates the stuttering sound of a skipping CD; in "F-Maj Pixie", they alter playing techniques to mimic the timbral and pitch artifacts of half-speed tape playback.

=== Machines as art objects ===
The idea of exhibiting the machines goes back to at least the Great Exhibition of 1851. Full acceptance by the museum curators came in 1934, with the "Machine Art" exhibit at New York Museum of Modern Art where the machine parts were presented as more traditional art objects: engines on pedestals like sculptures, propellers mounted on the walls like paintings.

László Moholy-Nagy tried to erase the border between a work of art and the machine in his "Light-Space Modulator", a "fountain of light" made in collaboration with the engineering company (AEG).

== Legacy ==
The modern aesthetics of high technology is to a large degree defined by the machine aesthetic. Just like machine aesthetic, the high-tech architecture proclaims that the form follows function, yet frequently completely detaches the form from function and resorts instead to the imitation of appearance of a factory or a restaurant kitchen.

== See also ==
- Utilitarian design, putting functionality first
- New Aesthetic, blending of digital and physical worlds

== Sources ==
- Brøvig, Ragnhild; Stevenson, Alex (2025). "Machine aesthetics in recorded and performed music: An analytical framework". Journal of Music Production Research. 1 (1): 49–69. doi:10.1386/jmpr_00005_1.
- Curl, James Stevens; Wilson, Susan (2021). The Oxford Dictionary of Architecture (4th ed.). Oxford University Press. doi:10.1093/acref/9780191918742.001.0001. ISBN 978-0-19-191874-2.
- Spurr, David (2016). "The Machine Aesthetic in Joyce and De Stijl". European Joyce Studies. 24. Brill: 7–19. ISSN 0923-9855. JSTOR 44871383.
- Rutsky, R.L. (1999). High Technē: Art and Technology from the Machine Aesthetic to the Posthuman. Electronic mediations. University of Minnesota Press. ISBN 978-1-4529-0394-1.
- Meecham, Pam; Sheldon, Julie (2013). "The 'machine aesthetic'". Modern Art: A Critical Introduction. Taylor & Francis. pp. 140–146. ISBN 978-1-317-97246-4.
- Lowry, Glenn D. (2012). "Barr's Diagrams" (PDF). Inventing Abstraction 1910-1925. MoMA. pp. 358–363.
- Sbriglio, J. (2015). Le Corbusier. The Villa Savoye. Le Corbusier Guides (engl.). Birkhäuser. ISBN 978-3-0356-0395-8.
