= Mechanomorphism =

Seeing machine-like behaviour in other humans

Mechanomorphism is the tendency of humans to see the machine-like behavior in other humans, animals, and other non-machine entities (like universe). It is considered to be one face of the man-machine duality (the "human-as-machine" side), the other being anthropomorphism of an intelligent device, like a computer (thinking of the "machine-as-human"). When the reflection goes on in both directions, with real life engaged in machine-like behavior that in turn imitates real life, a term mechanthropomorphism is sometimes used, for example, to describe a ballet where human dancers are performing as machines that engage in a human-like behavior.

R. H. Waters proposed to use the term in behavioristic psychology in the 1948 as a label for "the ascription of mechanical characteristics to the [...] individual, and the interpretation of human behavior in terms of concepts and processes [...] of machines", an opposite of anthropomorphism.

The use of the term to describe the mechanical metaphor of the neoclassical economics dates to K. H. M. Mittermaier (1986).

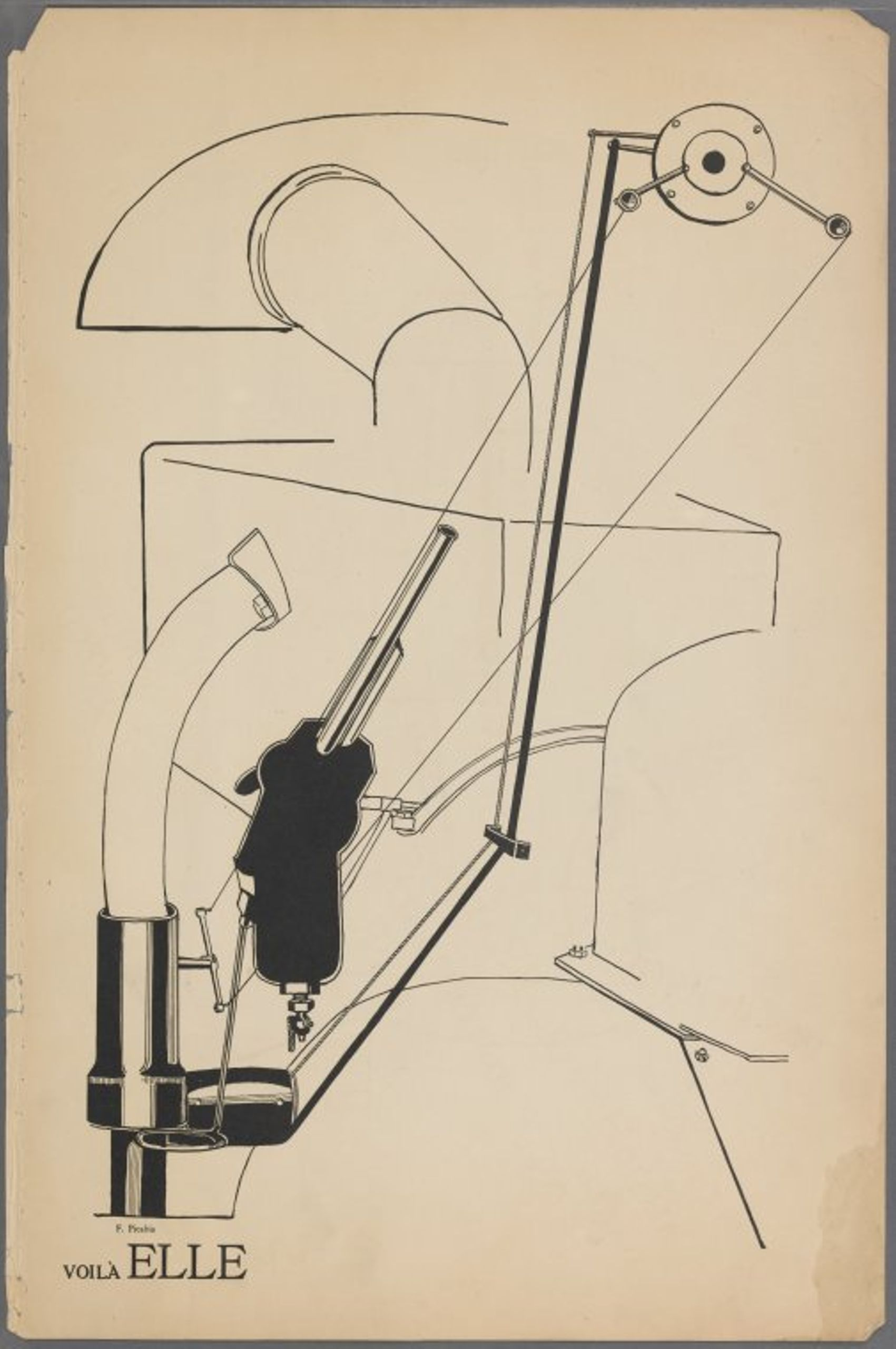
Voila Elle (1915)

In the visual arts, mechanomorphism was used by the adherents of machine aesthetic to define the complexity of human behaviors and social interactions through the mechanistic symbols (electric spark power, spinning wheel inertia, confined movements of a mechanical joint), as in the works of Marcel Duchamp or Francis Picabia. The view of women as "love machines" was used for their sexual objectification. Picabia commented on his Voilà Elle, "Here she is, an incomplete tubular machine: “she” is simply the HOLE of the target, whose reaction to the shot wad of fire from the gun initiates her own continual penetration".

In human–animal studies anthropomorphism and mechanomorphism sometimes are used in opposition to each other. The mechanomorphic views date back to the beast-machine theory of Descartes. Descartes in his Discourse on Method (1637) declared that, unlike a human with his conscious actions, the behavior of an animal can be completely described by the laws of physics, and thus an animal shall be considered a machine lacking the soul.

== Sources ==
- Caporael, L.R. (1986). "Anthropomorphism and mechanomorphism: Two faces of the human machine" (PDF). Computers in Human Behavior. 2 (3): 215–234. doi:10.1016/0747-5632(86)90004-X.
- Waters, R. H. (1948). "Mechanomorphism: a new term for an old mode of thought". Psychological Review. 55 (3): 139–142. doi:10.1037/h0058952. ISSN 1939-1471. PMID 18865255.
- Stark, S. (1963-06-01). "Management in Perspective: Creative Leadership: Human vs. Metal Brains". Academy of Management Journal. 6 (2): 160–169. doi:10.2307/254846. ISSN 0001-4273. JSTOR 254846.
- Scerri, Mario (2020). "Systems of Innovation and Economic Theory". Cambridge University Press.
- Broeckmann, A. (2016). "Towards the Art and Aesthetics of the Machine". Machine Art in the Twentieth Century. Leonardo (Col·lecció). Cambridge. pp. 47–86. ISBN 978-0-262-03506-4.
- Meecham, Pam; Sheldon, Julie (2013). "The 'machine aesthetic'". Modern Art: A Critical Introduction. Taylor & Francis. pp. 140–146. ISBN 978-1-317-97246-4.
- Crombez, J.M. (2021). Anxiety, Modern Society, and the Critical Method: Toward a Theory and Practice of Critical Socioanalysis. Studies in Critical Social Sciences. Brill. ISBN 978-90-04-44558-1.
- Karlsson, Fredrik (2012-02-12). "Anthropomorphism and Mechanomorphism". Humanimalia. 3 (2): 107–122. doi:10.52537/humanimalia.10051. ISSN 2151-8645.
- Jones, Amelia (1998). "'Women' in Dada: Elsa, Rrose, and Charlie" (PDF). In Sawelson-Gorse, Naomi (ed.). Women in Dada: Essays on Sex, Gender, and Identity. Cambridge, MA: MIT Press. pp. 142–172.
- Sueur, Cédric; Forin-Wiart, Marie-Amélie; Pelé, Marie (2020-12-07). "Are They Really Trying to Save Their Buddy? The Anthropomorphism of Animal Epimeletic Behaviours". Animals. 10 (12): 2323. doi:10.3390/ani10122323. ISSN 2076-2615. PMC 7762333. PMID 33297457.
- Boakes, R. (1984). "Rene Descartes and the beast-machine". From Darwin to Behaviourism: Psychology and the Minds of Animals. Cambridge University Press. pp. 85–87. ISBN 978-0-521-28012-9.
