= Madeleine Laliberté =

Canadian painter

Madeleine Laliberté (22 December 1912 – August 27, 1998) was a Canadian painter.

Laliberté was born in Victoriaville, Quebec, the daughter of Wilfrid Laliberté and Alexandrine Bourbeau. She first studied at the École des Beaux-Arts in Quebec City before traveling to Paris, where she studied at the Académie de la Grande Chaumière and with Marcel Gromaire, the latter from 1937 to 1938. Later in New York City she would study with Amédée Ozenfant from 1942 to 1944. In 1940 she held an exhibit with Jean Soucy in Quebec City, the start of almost two decades during which she would show her work widely. She quit painting in 1958, but resumed ten years later. Laliberté died in Quebec City. Her work is included in the collections of the National Gallery of Canada and the Musée national des beaux-arts du Québec.
