= Anne Said =

British artist (1914–1995)

- Born: August 19, 1914; Hook, Hampshire, England
- Died: 1995
- Education: Queen's College, London
- Notable work: Jo's Wild Wood (drawing, now in the Tate collection)
- Spouse: Hamed Said
- Children: Safaya Salter

Anne Said (19 August 1914 – 1995) was a British artist known for the quality of her drawings.

== Biography ==
Said was born in Hook in Hampshire and was educated at Queen's College in central London from 1925 to 1930. During the 1930s she studied art in Paris, occasionally taking lessons from Amédée Ozenfant which she paid for by designing and selling fabrics. In 1941 Said moved to Egypt where she taught art to a group of students with her husband Hamed Said. This resulted in two group exhibitions held in Cairo in 1948 and 1955. Similar exhibitions were held in England hosted by the Arts Council during 1949 and in 1952 at the Islamic Cultural Centre in London. Later works by Said were included in a joint English and Egyptian limited edition book, The Word & The Image. Said returned to England in 1955 and had a solo exhibition at the Beaux Arts Gallery in 1957 and also showed works at the New Art Centre. In 1960 she moved to Wiltshire and there, among other works, she produced the drawing Jo's Wild Wood which is now in the Tate collection.

Said's early works were signed Anne Cobham and her daughter is the artist Safaya Salter.
