= Stella Snead =

English surrealist painter, photographer, and collage artist (1910–2006)

- Born: April 2, 1910; London, England
- Died: March 18, 2006 (aged 95); New York City, U.S.
- Known for: Painting, photography
- Movement: Surrealism

Stella Snead (April 2, 1910 – March 18, 2006) was a surrealist painter, photographer, and collage artist born in London, England. She immigrated to the United States in 1939 to escape World War II.

In 1936, Snead enrolled at the Ozenfant Academy of Fine Arts in London, founded by Amédée Ozenfant. She moved to the United States in 1939, where she became part of a circle of surrealist artists who had also emigrated. In 1940, she traveled by bus to Los Angeles, where she was inspired by the landscapes and indigenous cultures of the American West and Southwest. In 1946, Snead relocated to Taos, New Mexico, where she lived in an adobe structure and observed Native American ceremonies and dances.

Snead's paintings reflect her fascination with natural phenomena such as tornadoes, geysers, and volcanoes, often depicting animals and humans engaged in ritualistic movements within anthropomorphic landscapes. One of her notable works is Ecstatic Cow (1943). She held a solo exhibition in 1941 at Gallery 10 in New York and exhibited at Bonestell Gallery (1945), the Arcade Gallery in London (1945), and E. L. T. Mesens's London Gallery (1950). In 1949, her work was included in the Carnegie International Exhibition in Pittsburgh.

Recognition for Snead's work resurfaced in 2005 when her paintings were included in Surrealism USA, a major exhibition at the National Academy Museum in New York, with subsequent showings at the Wadsworth Atheneum, the Los Angeles County Museum of Art, and other galleries.

In the 1950s, Snead transitioned to photography, moving to India, where she documented Hindu sculptures, landscapes, and street life. She published eight books of photography, including Shiva's Pigeons: An Experience of India (1972), Beach Patterns: The World of Sea and Sand (1975), and Animals in Four Worlds: Sculptures from India (1989).

Snead spent her later years traveling between New York City, London, Taos, and India. In 1971, she settled on the Upper West Side of Manhattan, where she lived until her death on March 18, 2006, at the Jewish Home and Hospital in Manhattan. According to her art dealer Pavel Zoubok, she died of natural causes and had no immediate survivors.

== Early life ==
Snead was born in London, England, on April 2, 1910, to Ethel May Snead and Clarence Frederick Heron Snead. In her autobiography, Snead described her parents' troubled relationship, attributing much of the tension to what she referred to as her father’s “dark moods.” These moods contributed to the separation of Stella and her mother from the family home in 1915.

Her parents decided that she would be raised as a lifelong vegetarian and remain unvaccinated to avoid "contaminating" her blood. As a child, her father resented the attention and affection her mother gave her, leading to increasing hostility toward Ethel May. At birth, her father named her Magdalene Snead, but her mother preferred Stella. Eventually, she adopted her mother’s choice as her first name, keeping Magdalene as her middle name.

Snead attended several small village schools in England before enrolling at St. Christopher School in Letchworth, a progressive theosophical institution. She later took a secretarial course but struggled to maintain a steady job due to depressive tendencies that made it difficult to adhere to a daily work schedule.

In 1928, Snead moved from Leicester to Sutton, Surrey. In 1936, she accompanied her only artist friend to the Spanish island of Tenerife, where they painted flowers in a private garden. That summer, she continued painting in her bedroom, much to her mother’s concern, as she isolated herself and neglected physical exercise and social interactions.

== Painting career ==
Out of work due to mental illness, Snead’s mother supported her until Snead, in her early twenties, became captivated by the idea of painting. She initially developed an interest in painting after a trip to Tenerife in the Canary Islands. During the trip, she observed her friend painting in the gardens, which inspired her to create her own works.

After three years of independent study, Snead enrolled at the Ozenfant Academy of Fine Art in London, where she studied under the renowned French abstract artist Amédée Ozenfant. While there, she befriended fellow student Leonora Carrington. When Ozenfant moved to New York to establish the Ozenfant School of Fine Arts, Snead followed in 1939 and continued studying under him until 1941.

The outbreak of World War II prompted Snead’s move from London to the United States. She arrived in New York in 1939 but soon embarked on a journey across the country, frequently hitching rides on mail trucks. She eventually settled for several years in Taos, New Mexico.

Initially painting garden scenes, Snead transitioned to a surrealist style, often depicting nocturnal settings populated by semi-human and mystical creatures. She claimed to have completed her first Surrealist painting in 1941, intending to impress Max Ernst, a leading figure of the movement, who was expected to attend her solo exhibition. In 1942, she took a Greyhound bus to Hollywood, where she painted scenes inspired by her surroundings.

In 1944, Snead traveled to Mexico to visit the newly erupted Parícutin volcano, though by the time of her visit, it had become dormant. Later that year, she returned to New York with a collection of new paintings. By 1943, her work had shifted toward fantasy, often featuring animals rather than people. Notable examples include The Sulky Lion, characterized by a two-dimensional composition with disproportionate background buildings, and Tiger in the Sky, which displayed a more three-dimensional approach.

Following a return to London, Snead experienced the breakup of a romantic relationship, triggering a depressive episode that ultimately led to her abandoning painting. Decades later, in the late 1980s, she attempted to recreate some of her lost works. Many of her original pieces had been lost, stolen, or destroyed, prompting her to track down missing works or repaint them using photographs taken in the 1940s.

Her final solo exhibition of paintings took place in 1950 at The London Gallery. Nearly half a century later, in 1999, her work was showcased again in the exhibition Rediscovery: The Paintings of Stella Snead at the CFM Gallery in New York. The exhibition catalog featured contributions from Neil Zukerman, Whitney Chadwick, Salomon Grimberg, Stephen Robeson-Miller, and Pavel Zoubok, alongside text by Snead herself. It also included a comprehensive timeline of her artistic career, childhood, and personal struggles.

Snead’s final painting, completed in 1995, was a "surrealized" postcard titled Signals from the Grotto. She considered it her most successful work since 1987. The piece was exhibited in a show curated by Robert Metzger at the Aldrich Museum in Ridgefield, Connecticut, in December 1985.

== Photography career ==
During Snead’s extended hiatus from painting, she turned to photography as a creative outlet, capturing images of the world around her during her post-World War II travels.

A significant portion of Snead’s photography was inspired by her multiple trips to the Indian subcontinent in the 1960s. She lived in India from 1960 until 1971, having moved there after her mother died of a blood clot. During this time, her surrealist sensibilities emerged in her interpretations of Indian monuments and landscapes.

Her photography was published in collections such as Ruins in Jungles (1962), Animals in Four Worlds: Sculptures from India, and Shiva’s Pigeons: An Experience of India. Later, she repurposed some of these photographs to create collages and published a collection titled Can Drowning Be Fun? A Nonsense Book.

Snead’s engagement with photography intensified in the mid-1950s. She learned to print her own photographs and began working in the darkroom independently. After living in India for over a decade, she returned to New York in 1971, bringing all her paintings with her—except for Rio Grande, which had been damaged.
