= Promenade architecturale =

Architectural concept

Promenade architecturale is a concept developed by Swiss-French architect Le Corbusier that refers to the implied "itinerary" of a built environment. Le Corbusier coined the term in reference to his houses: Villas La Roche and Savoye. In the study of architecture there is a longstanding tradition of walking to achieve spatial perception, of for example, a street, building or any spatial premises designed or otherwise. Throughout history the perception of spaces through movement, mainly by means of walking through or along them, has always been a recurring, yet often overlooked concept. Promenade architecturale refers literally to such a walk of perception, or in other words, an "Architectural walk".

== Sources ==
- Moszant, Maciej (2021). Kępa, Agnieszka; Zdebel, Ela; Cisak, Ewelina (eds.). "The Saturday Walks Mapping the Gilets Jaunes' Protests Routes in Paris". kreaturazine.pl (Delft University of Technology Honours Programme Thesis). KREATURA*.
