= Villa Savoye =

House by Le Corbusier in Poissy, France

- View of the west and south facades of the villa.

- Location within France
- 48°55′28″N 2°1′42″E
- Location: 82, Rue de Villiers; 78300 Poissy; Poissy, Yvelines, France

Site notes
- Architect(s): Le Corbusier, Pierre Jeanneret
- Owner: French government
- Website: www.villa-savoye.fr/en

UNESCO World Heritage Site
- Type: Cultural
- Criteria: i, ii, vi
- Designated: 2016 (40th session)
- Part of: The Architectural Work of Le Corbusier, an Outstanding Contribution to the Modern Movement
- Reference no.: 1321-006

Villa Savoye (French pronunciation: [savwa]) is a modernist villa and gatelodge in Poissy, on the outskirts of Paris, France. It was designed by the Swiss-French architect Le Corbusier and his cousin Pierre Jeanneret with interior and furnishing by Charlotte Perriand, and built between 1928 and 1931 using reinforced concrete.

As an exemplar of Le Corbusier's "five points" for new constructions, the villa is representative of the origins of modern architecture and is one of the most easily recognizable and renowned examples of the International style.

The house was originally built as a country retreat for the Savoye family. After being purchased by the neighbouring school, it became the property of the French state in 1958. Due to many different problems it was rarely inhabited. After surviving several proposals to demolish it, it was designated as an official French historical monument in 1965 (a rare event, as Le Corbusier was still alive). It was thoroughly renovated between 1985 and 1997, and the refurbished house is now open to visitors year round under the care of the Centre des monuments nationaux.

In July 2016, the house and 16 other buildings by Le Corbusier, spread over seven countries, were inscribed as The Architectural Work of Le Corbusier World Heritage Site by UNESCO.

== Background ==
By the end of the 1920s Le Corbusier was already an internationally renowned architect. His book Vers une Architecture had been translated into several languages, his work with the Centrosoyuz in Moscow had involved him with the Russian avant-garde, and his problems with the League of Nations competition had been widely publicised. He was also one of the first members of the Congrès International d'Architecture Moderne (CIAM) and was becoming known as a champion of modern architecture.

The villas designed by Le Corbusier in the early 1920s demonstrated what he termed the "precision" of architecture, where each feature of the design needed to be justified in design and urban terms. His work in the later part of the decade, including his urban designs for Algiers, began to be more free-form.

Pierre and Eugénie Savoye approached Le Corbusier about building a country home in Poissy in the spring of 1928. The prospective site was a green field on an otherwise wooded plot of land, with views of the landscape to the north west that matched the approach to the plot along the road. Other than an initial brief prepared by Emile for a summer house, space for cars, an extra bedroom and a caretaker's lodge, Le Corbusier had such freedom in executing the commission that he was limited only by his own architectural aesthetic. He began work on the project in September 1928. His initial ideas were ultimately manifested in the final building, though between Autumn 1928 and Spring 1929 he drew up a set of alternative designs that were governed primarily by the Savoye couple's concerns regarding cost. The eventual solution to the cost problem was to reduce the volume of the building by moving the master bedroom down to the first floor and reducing the grid spacing from 5 metres to 4.75 metres.

== Construction ==
Estimates of the cost in February 1929 lay in the region of half a million francs, although this excluded the cost of the lodge and the landscaping elements (almost twice the original budget). The project was tendered in February, with contracts being awarded in March 1929. Changes made to the design while the project was being built, which included an amendment to the storey height and the removal and reinstatement of the chauffeur's accommodation, led to the costs rising to approximately 900,000 francs. When the construction of the project started, no design work had been done on the lodge, and the final design was only presented to the client in June 1929. The design was for a double lodge, but this was reduced to a single lodge for cost reasons. Although the construction of the entire house was completed within a year, it was not habitable until 1931.

== Design ==
The Villa Savoye, which is probably Le Corbusier's best known building from the 1930s, had an enormous influence on international modernism. Its design embodied his emblematic "Five Points", the basic tenets in his new architectural aesthetic:

1. Support of ground-level pilotis, elevating the building from the earth and allowing the garden to be extended to the space beneath.
2. A functional roof serving as a garden and terrace, reclaiming for Nature the land occupied by the building.
3. A free floor plan, devoid of load-bearing walls, allowing walls to be placed freely and only where aesthetically needed.
4. Long horizontal windows for illumination and ventilation.
5. Freely-designed façades functioning merely as a skin for the wall and windows, and unconstrained by load-bearing considerations.

Villa Savoye salon

Unlike with his earlier town villas, Le Corbusier was able to carefully design all four sides of the Villa Savoye so that they took the view and the orientation of the sun into account. On the ground floor he placed the main entrance hall, ramp and stairs, garage, and the rooms of the chauffeur and maid. The first floor contained the master bedroom, the son's bedroom, guest bedroom, kitchen, salon and external terraces. The salon was oriented to the south east whilst the terrace faced the east. The son's bedroom faced the north west, and the kitchen and service terrace faced south-west. On the second-floor level was a series of sculpted spaces that formed a solarium.

The plan was set out using the principal ratios of the Golden section: in this case a square divided into sixteen equal parts, extended on two sides to incorporate the projecting façades, and then further divided so as to fix the position of the ramp and the entrance.

In his book Vers une Architecture, Corbusier exclaimed "The motor car is an object with a simple function (to travel) and complicated aims (comfort, resistance, appearance)...". The house, designed as a second residence and located outside Paris, was designed with the car in mind. The sense of mobility that the car conferred was translated into a feeling of movement that is integral to the building. The approach to the house was by car, past the caretaker's lodge, and eventually under the building itself. Even the curved arc of the industrial glazing of the ground floor entrance was determined by the turning circle of a car. After its principal occupants had been dropped off by the chauffeur, the car proceeded around the curve to park in the garage. Meanwhile, the arrivals entered the house transversely into the main hall through a portico of flanking columns.

External ramp to the second floor

The four columns in the entrance hall seemingly direct the visitor up the ramp. This ramp, which can be seen from almost everywhere in the house, continues up to the first-floor living area and salon before continuing externally from the first-floor roof terrace up to the second-floor solarium. Throughout his career, Le Corbusier was interested in bringing a feeling of sacredness into the act of dwelling, and acts such as washing and eating were given significance by their locations. At the Villa Savoye, the act of cleansing is represented both by the sink in the entrance hall and the celebration of the health-giving properties of the sun in the solarium on the roof, which is given significance by being the terminal upper point of the ramp.

Le Corbusier's piloti perform a number of functions around the house, both inside and out. On the two longer elevations they are flush with the face of the façade and imply heaviness and support, but on the shorter sides they are set back, giving a floating effect that emphasises the horizontal dimension of the house. The wide strip window of the first-floor terrace has two baby piloti to support and stiffen the wall above. Although these piloti are in a similar plane to the larger columns below, a false perspective when viewed from outside the house gives the impression that they are located deeper within the house than they actually are.

The Villa Savoye uses the horizontal ribbon windows found in his earlier villas. Unlike his contemporaries, Le Corbusier often chose to use timber windows rather than metal ones. It has been suggested that this is because he was interested in glass for its planar properties, and that the set-back position of the glass in the timber frame allowed the façade to be seen as a series of parallel planes.

== Later history ==
Problems with the Savoyes caused by all the requests for additional payment from the contractors for all the changes were compounded by the need for early repairs to the new house. Each autumn, the Savoyes suffered rainwater leaks through the roof. The exclusion of downpipes and sills which would have disturbed their aesthetic made the white surfaces more susceptible to staining and erosion from overflowing rainwater. The building was also marred by cracks because the material was not designed for structural durability. The Savoyes continued to live in the house until 1940, leaving during World War II. It was occupied twice during the war: first by the Germans – when it was used as a hay store – and then by the Americans, with both occupations severely damaging the building. The Savoyes returned to their estate after the war, but were no longer in a position to live as they had before the war, and soon abandoned the house again.

The villa was expropriated by the town of Poissy in 1958, which first used it as a public youth centre and later considered demolishing it to make way for a schoolhouse complex. Protests from architects who felt the house should be saved, and the intervention of Le Corbusier himself, spared the house from demolition. A first attempt at restoration was begun in 1963 by architect Jean Debuisson, despite opposition from Le Corbusier. The villa was added to the French register of historical monuments in 1965, becoming France's first modernist building to be designated as a historical monument, and also the first to be the object of restoration while its architect was still living. In 1985, a thorough state-funded restoration process led by architect Jean-Louis Véret was undertaken. It was completed in 1997. The restoration included structural and surface repairs to the façades and terraces because of the deterioration of the concrete; the installation of lighting and security cameras; and the reinstatement of some of the original fixtures and fittings.

== Legacy ==
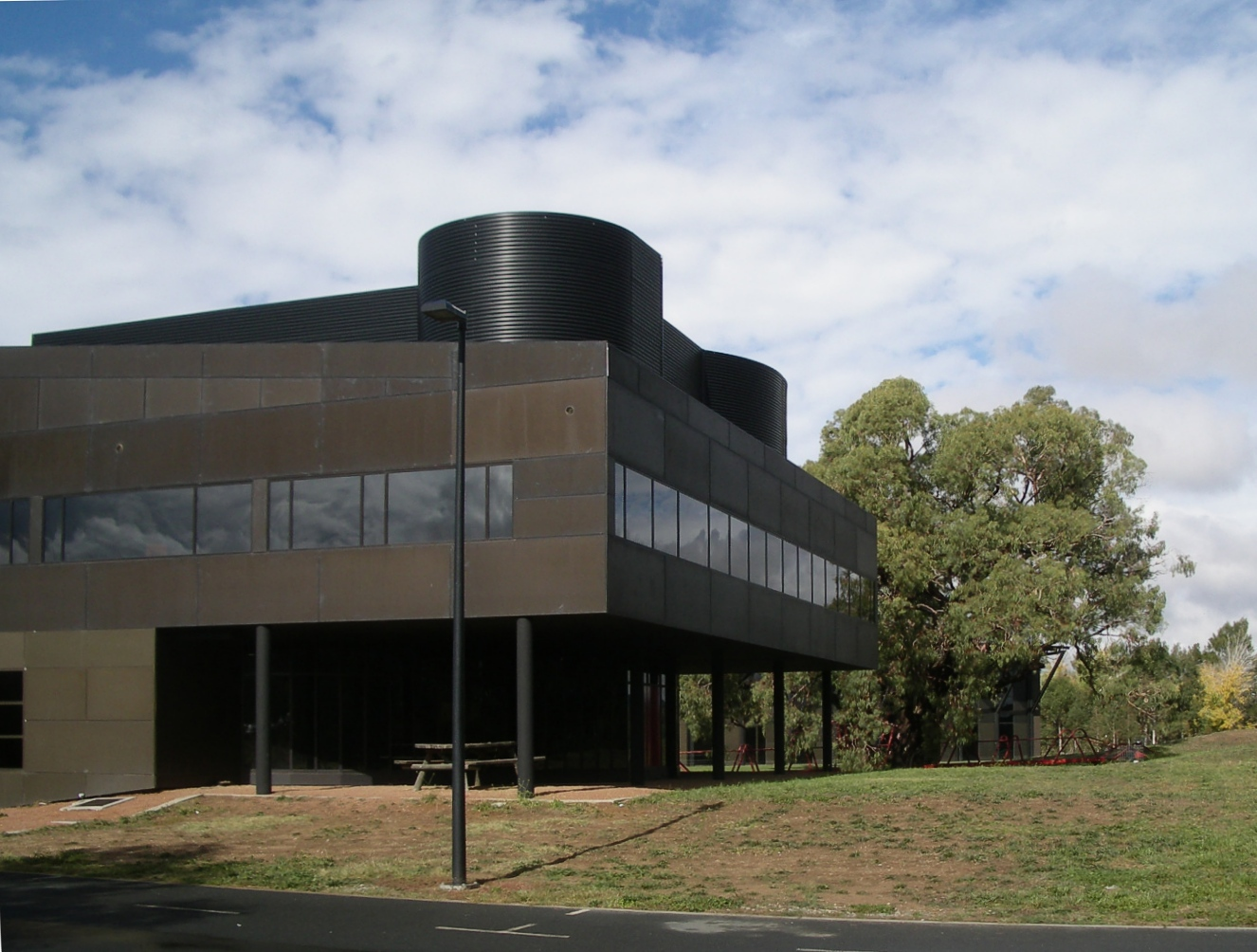
The southern hemisphere "shadow" of the Villa Savoye, in Canberra, Australia

The Villa Savoye was a very influential building of the 1930s, and imitations can be found all over the world. The building featured in two hugely influential books of the time: Hitchcock and Johnson's The International Style published in 1932, and F. R. S. Yorke's The Modern House published in 1934, as well as the second volume of Le Corbusier's own series The Complete Works. In his 1947 essay The Mathematics of the Ideal Villa, Colin Rowe compared the Villa Savoye to Palladio's Villa Rotunda. Alice T. Friedman said in 1998 that the Villa Savoye was one of a few 20th-century residences, along with the Farnsworth House and Fallingwater, which consistently captivated visitors despite being widely covered in the media.

The freedom given to Le Corbusier by the Savoyes resulted in a house that was governed more by his five principles than by any requirements of the occupants. Nevertheless, it was the last time these five principles were expressed so fully, and the house marked the end of one phase of his design approach, as well as being the last in a series of buildings dominated by the colour white.

Some general criticisms have been made with regard to Le Corbusier's five points of architecture, and these apply specifically to the Villa Savoye in terms of:

1. Support of ground-level pilotis – the piloti tended to be symbolic rather than actual structural elements.
2. Functional roof – poor detailing in this case led to the roof leaking.

After the Villa Savoye, Le Corbusier's experimentation with Surrealism informed his design for the Beistegui apartments, but his next villa design, for Mademoiselle Mandrot near Toulon, embodied a regionalist agenda and relied on local stone for its finish.

The west wing of the Australian Institute of Aboriginal and Torres Strait Islander Studies in Canberra, designed by Ashton Raggatt McDougall, is a nearly exact replica of the Villa Savoye, except that it is black. According to Howard Raggat, this antipodean architectural quotation is "a kind of inversion, a reflection, but also a kind of shadow".
