= Amédée Ozenfant =

French painter (1886–1966)

Amédée Ozenfant, 1920–21, Nature morte (Still Life), oil on canvas, 81.28 cm x 100.65 cm, San Francisco Museum of Modern Art

Amédée Ozenfant (15 April 1886 – 4 May 1966) was a French cubist painter and writer. Together with Charles-Edouard Jeanneret (later known as Le Corbusier) he founded the Purist movement.

== Education ==
Ozenfant was born into a bourgeois family in Saint-Quentin, Aisne and was educated at Dominican colleges in Saint-Sébastien. After completing his education he returned to Saint-Quentin and began painting in watercolour and pastels.

In 1904 he attended a drawing course run by Jules-Alexandre Patrouillard Degrave at the Ecole Municipale de Dessin Quentin Delatour in Saint-Quentin. In 1905 he began training in decorative arts in Paris, where his teachers were Maurice Pillard Verneuil and later Charles Cottet.

By 1907 he had enrolled in the Académie de La Palette, where he studied under Jacques-Emile Blanche. He befriended Roger de La Fresnaye and André Dunoyer de Segonzac, who were his fellow students. In 1908 he began exhibiting at the Salon de la Société Nationale des Beaux-Arts, and two years later began exhibiting at the Salon d'Automne.

== Collaboration with Le Corbusier and development of Purism ==
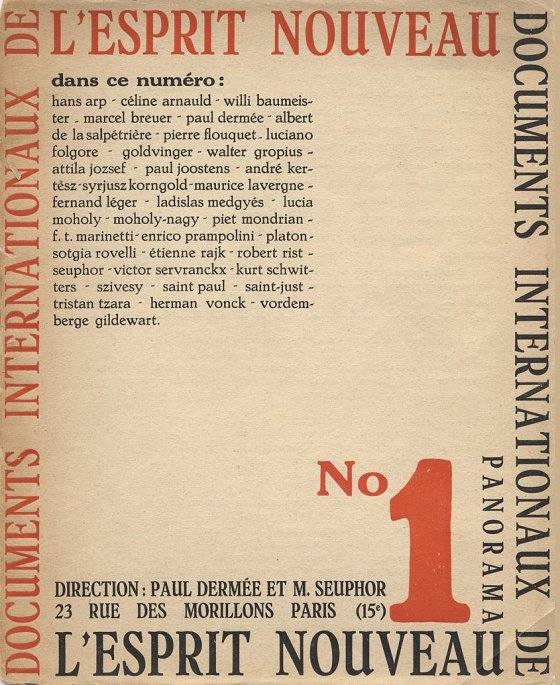
L'Esprit Nouveau, No. 1, October 1920. Edited by Paul Dermée and Michel Seuphor, later by Charles-Edouard Jeanneret (Le Corbusier) and Amédée Ozenfant. Published by Éditions de l'Esprit Nouveau, Paris

Between 1909 and 1913 he travelled to Russia, Italy, Belgium, and the Netherlands and attended lectures at the Collège de France in Paris. In 1915, in collaboration with Max Jacob and Guillaume Apollinaire, Ozenfant founded the magazine L'Elan, which he edited until 1916, and his theories of Purism began to develop.

He met the Swiss architect and painter Charles-Edouard Jeanneret (Le Corbusier) in 1917, and they jointly expounded the doctrines of Purism in their book Après le cubisme. Its publication coincided with the first Purist exhibition, held at the Galerie Thomas in Paris in 1917, in which Ozenfant exhibited. There was a further collaboration between them on the journal L'Esprit Nouveau, which was published from 1920 to 1925.

A second Purist exhibition was held at the Galerie Druet, Paris, in 1921 in which Ozenfant again exhibited. In 1924 he opened Académie Moderne, a free studio in Paris with Fernand Léger, where they both taught with Aleksandra Ekster and Marie Laurencin. Ozenfant and Le Corbusier wrote La Peinture moderne in 1925 and in 1928 Ozenfant published Art, which was subsequently published in English as The Foundations of Modern Art in 1931. In this he fully expounds his theory of Purism, and it is remarkable for its idiosyncratic and aphoristic style.

== His influence on the use of colour in England ==
Amédée Ozenfant, 1920, Still Life, Dishes, oil on canvas, 72 x 59.5 cm, Hermitage Museum

Amédée Ozenfant, 1921, Nature morte au verre de vin rouge (Still Life with Glass of Red Wine), oil on canvas, 50.6 x 61.2 cm, Kunstmuseum Basel

He later founded his own atelier, l'Académie Ozenfant, in the residence and studio that Le Corbusier had designed for him. He moved to London in 1936, where he set up the Ozenfant Academy of Fine Arts in May of that year, before moving to New York City some two years later. His students in London included Leonora Carrington, Sari Dienes, Anne Said, Stella Snead and Hamed Saeed. Students in New York included his assistant, Chaim Koppelman, the Canadian Madeleine Laliberté and Iranian Manoucher Yektai.

In the early Purist manifestoes, colour was deemed secondary to form, and this could be seen in the careful placing of colour to reinforce discrete architectural elements by Le Corbusier in his work of the mid-1920s. However, by the time he was in England, Ozenfant had refined his ideas about colour and outlined many of these in the six articles on the subject that he wrote for the Architectural Review. Colour was now regarded as an essential element of architecture, rather than something considered by the architect while his work was being erected. Ozenfant believed that colour always modifies the form of the building and should receive more careful attention.

We must endeavour to introduce a little order into this business, or at least sense into a great deal of it. But what is sense without order? We must try to find some method of arriving at some sort of order—one that will at least enable us to escape from this vagueness in the design of colour.

Ozenfant's revised thoughts on the importance of colour were partly due to the influence of the artist Paul Signac and his theories on Divisionism. Signac maintained that the Neo-Impressionist technique of applying brushstrokes obtained the maximum brightness, colour, and harmony. Unlike the techniques used by the earlier Impressionists, patches of colours remained distinct, blending when viewed at a distance. In this instance, when no fusion of the colours takes place, the interaction is called "simultaneous contrast", a condition in which colours merely influence one another by proximity. This technique prevents the muddiness or darkening that result when patches of colour actually run into each other. It was an extension of this technique that was recommended by Ozenfant for achieving "colour solidity" in architecture, altering colours visually by contrast to create the illusion of solidity.

This notion of "solidity" increasingly became an issue as the nature of modern construction changed, especially when dealing with such things as the lightweight partition and the glass curtain wall.

In 1937 Ozenfant said:

I believe that an immense service would be done to architects, decorators, house-painters etc., if a chart especially adapted to their particular requirements were established. This chart might contain about a hundred hues.

Ozenfant's articles on colour were read with interest, particularly by:

…the students at the Architectural Association (AA), for example, but even for David Medd, a student at the AA who later authored the color standards for British schools, Ozenfant had already gone to the United States by the time he inquired about the course at the Academy.

The effect of his words can be seen in a number of articles on colour published in England shortly after the Second World War. Indeed, we are told in 1956 that they had a direct influence on the decoration of some of the early post-war schools.

== Final years ==
The Ozenfant School of Fine Arts in New York was in operation from 1939 until 1955. He became a US citizen in 1944. Ozenfant taught and lectured widely in the United States until 1955, when he returned to France, where he was renaturalized in 1953. He remained there for the rest of his life and died in Cannes in 1966.

== Collections ==
The Guggenheim Museum (New York City), the Hermitage Museum, the Honolulu Museum of Art, Kunstmuseum Basel (Switzerland), the Louvre, the Museum of Modern Art (New York City), Muzeum Sztuki (Lodz, Poland), the National Gallery of Australia (Canberra), the Philadelphia Museum of Art, the San Francisco Museum of Modern Art, the Tate Gallery (London) and the Walker Art Center (Minnesota) are among the public collections holding works by Amédée Ozenfant.

== See also ==
- Crystal Cubism

== References and sources ==
Sources

- William W. Braham. Modern Color / Modern Architecture. Aldershot: Ashgate, 2002.
- Cowling, Elizabeth; Mundy, Jennifer (1990). On Classic Ground: Picasso, Léger, de Chirico and the New Classicism 1910-1930. London: Tate Gallery. ISBN 1-854-37043-X
- Judi Freeman. "Ozenfant, Amédée." Grove Art Online. Oxford Art Online. Oxford University Press. Retrieved 26 November 2012.
- Los Angeles county museum of art, Carol S. Eliel, Françoise Ducros, Tag Gronberg, Amédée Ozenfant, and Charles-Edouard Jeanneret. 2001. L'esprit nouveau [exhibition, Los Angeles County Museum of Art, April 29-August 5, 2001] : purism in Paris, 1918-1925. New York: Harry N. Abrams. ISBN 0-8109-6727-8
- Floyd Ratcliff. Paul Signac and Color in Neo-Impressionism, including the first English edition of From Eugène Delacroix to Neo-Impressionism (New York: Rockefeller University Press, 1992)
