= Ribbon window =

Architectural style of fenestration

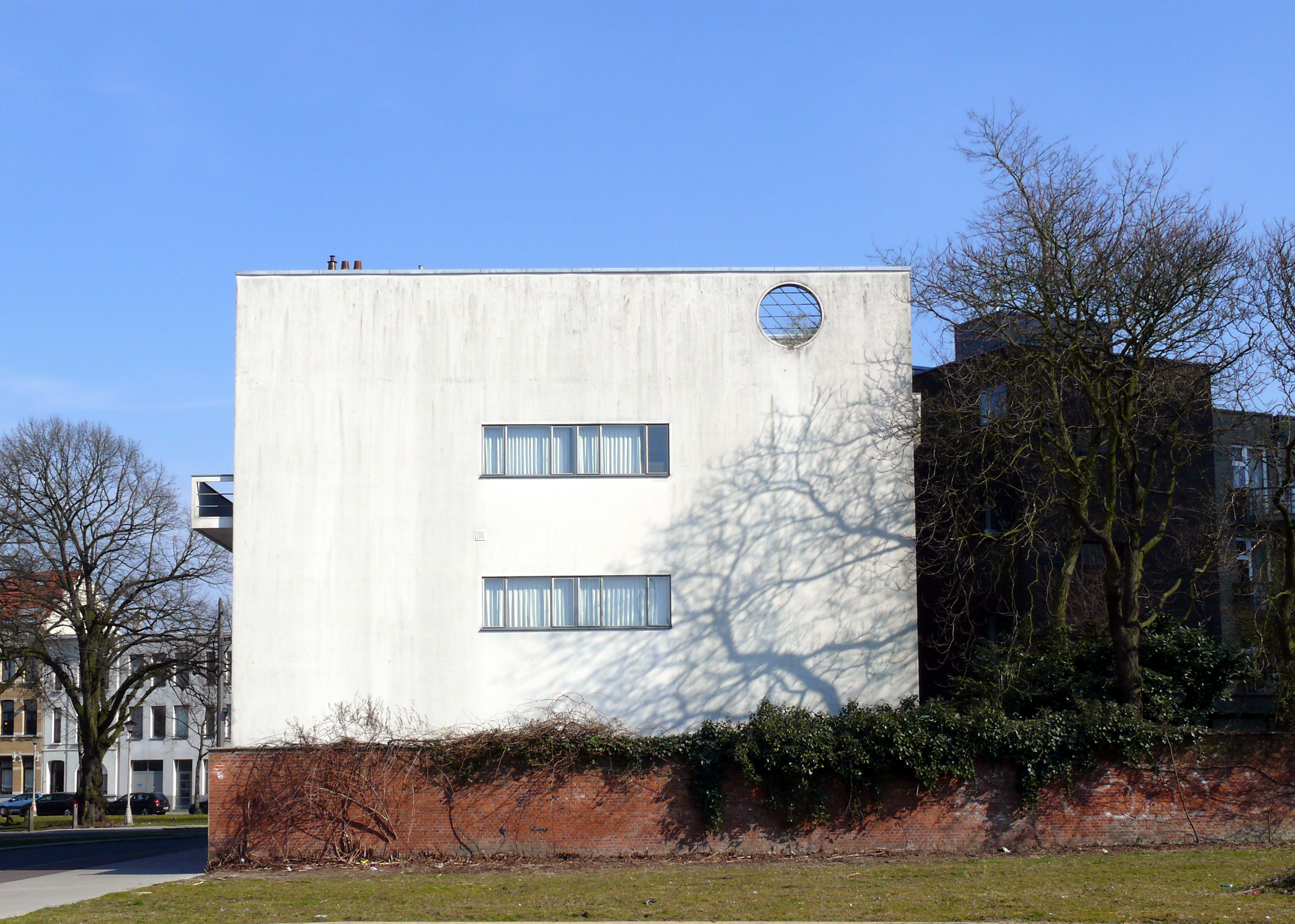
Ribbon windows in Antwerp

Ribbon windows are a style of window that form long, horizontal bands that extend across building façades, allowing natural light to enter interior spaces more evenly and offering panoramic exterior views. The concept was first conceived by the architect Le Corbusier in the 1920s as part of his Five Points of a New Architecture. In contemporary architecture, ribbon windows are widely used and have evolved beyond their original form. While many still reflect the horizontal emphasis of the modernist tradition, advancements in building materials and design methods have enabled more varied applications. Modern adaptations often include curved or angular configurations, as well as integration with irregular or dynamic building geometries, an approach sometimes referred to as "neo-Corbusian." Ribbon windows are designed to maintain a balance between functionality, aesthetics, and spatial openness.
