= Tag Gronberg =

Theresa Ann "Tag" Gronberg is an art historian with Birkbeck College, University of London. She is a specialist in the art of the Vienna Secession and Viennese coffeehouse culture. Her research interests also include gender and visual culture in 1920s France.

Her first sole-authored book was Designs on Modernity: Exhibiting the City in 1920s Paris which was published by Manchester University Press in 1998. Her second book was Vienna - City of Modernity, 1890-1914, published by Peter Lang in 2007.

She was married to the art historian and critic Paul Overy who died in 2008.

== Selected publications ==
=== Articles and chapters ===
- "The Inner Man: Interiors and Masculinity in Early Twentieth-Century Vienna", The Oxford Art Journal, 24, No. 1 (2001), 67–88.
- "Coffeehouse Encounters: Adolf Loos's Café Museum", FrauenKunstWissenschaft, No. 32 (December 2001), 22–33.
- "The Viennese coffeehouse: a legend in performance" in Performance, Fashion and the Modern Interior from the Victorians to Today, eds. Fiona Fisher et al. (Berg, 2011)
- "Myths of the Viennese Cafe: Ephemerality, Performativity and Loss" in Design Dialogue: Jews, Culture and Viennese Modernism, edited by Elana Shapira. (Bohlau Verlag, 2018)

=== Books ===
- Designs on Modernity: Exhibiting the City in 1920s Paris. Manchester University Press, 1998. ISBN 978-0719050077 (paperback 2003).
- Vienna - City of Modernity, 1890-1914. Peter Lang, 2007. ISBN 978-3039110469
- "Coffeehouse Orientalism" in The Viennese Café and Fin-de-Siècle Culture (Berghahn, 2013).
- The Viennese Café and Fin-de-siècle Culture. Berghahn Books, 2013. (co-editor with Charlotte Ashby and Simon Shaw-Miller)
