= University of Illinois (disambiguation) =

University of Illinois may refer to:

- University of Illinois Urbana-Champaign (flagship campus)
- University of Illinois Chicago
- University of Illinois Springfield
- University of Illinois system

It can also refer to:

- Illinois Fighting Illini, the athletic teams of the Urbana–Champaign campus
- Illinois Fighting Illini men's basketball
- Illinois Fighting Illini football
