= L'Esprit Nouveau =

French arts magazine

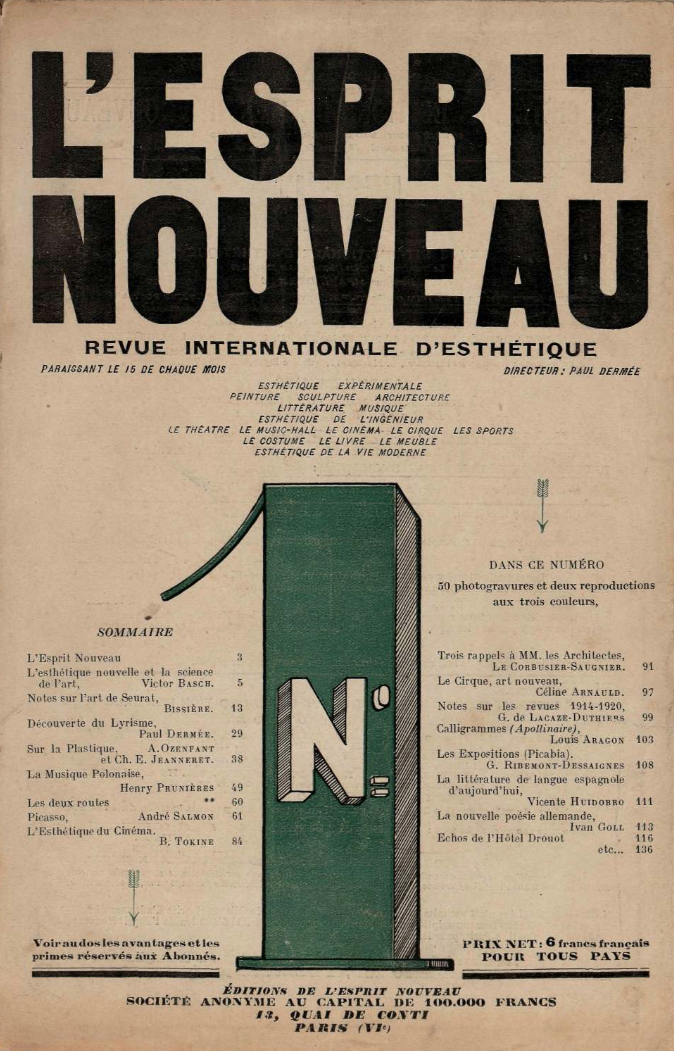
L'Esprit Nouveau. No.1 (1920)

L'Esprit Nouveau (transl. The New Spirit) was a magazine founded by architect Le Corbusier, poet Paul Dermée, and painter Amédée Ozenfant in 1920.

== Content ==
The journal published a total of 28 editions between October 1920 and January 1925, addressing a broad range of topics including architecture, urbanism, painting, literature, cinema, sciences, and sports, all in the context of exploring and defining modernity. The first three issues were subtitled "Revue Internationale d'Esthétique". From the fourth issue onward, the subtitle changed to "Revue Internationale Illustrée de l'Activité Contemporaine."

The articles written by Le Corbusier for L'Esprit Nouveau comprise a number of those appearing in his seminal 1923 book Toward an Architecture.

== Publication issues ==
Although advertised as such, L'Esprit Nouveau was not published on a consistent monthly basis. While it aimed to maintain regular publication, the journal's schedule was irregular due to various challenges, including financial and organizational difficulties. Its publication pace varied, with some periods of delay or interruption. For example, there was a notable hiatus in publication during parts of its run, such as from late 1922 to December 1923. This irregularity reflected the financial and logistical struggles that many avant-garde journals faced during that era.

== Reasons for decline ==
The publication of L'Esprit Nouveau ceased in January 1925 due to a combination of factors:

- Financial Difficulties: Like many avant-garde journals of the time, L'Esprit Nouveau faced significant financial constraints. Maintaining such a multidisciplinary and ambitious publication required substantial resources, and the limited audience for its specialized content made it difficult to sustain.
- Internal Conflicts: Tensions among the journal’s founders—Paul Dermée, Amédée Ozenfant, and Le Corbusier—also contributed to its challenges. These tensions led to Dermée's departure as co-director early in the journal’s run, though he later returned as a contributor.
- Declining Relevance and Audience: By the mid-1920s, the avant-garde landscape in France had shifted, with movements like Surrealism rising to prominence. L'Esprit Nouveau’s emphasis on rationalism, purism, and the aesthetics of modernity may have seemed less compelling to a readership increasingly drawn to the more provocative and imaginative ethos of Surrealism.
- Broader Shifts in the Founders’ Focus:
  - Le Corbusier became increasingly invested in his architectural and urban planning projects, publishing influential works like Vers une Architecture (1923) and Urbanisme (1924).
  - Ozenfant also pursued his work as a painter and theorist.

The final issue of L'Esprit Nouveau (No. 28) was published in January 1925, and while the journal ended, its influence persisted, particularly in shaping modernist aesthetics and thought.
