= Purism =

French art movement

Le Corbusier, 1922, Nature morte verticale (Vertical Still Life), oil on canvas, 146.3 cm × 89.3 cm (57.6 by 35.2 inches), Kunstmuseum Basel

Purism, referring to the arts, was a movement that took place between 1918 and 1925 that influenced French painting and architecture. Purism was led by Amédée Ozenfant and Charles-Édouard Jeanneret (Le Corbusier). Ozenfant and Le Corbusier formulated an aesthetic doctrine born from a criticism of Cubism and called it Purism: where objects are represented as elementary forms devoid of detail. The main concepts were presented in their short essay "Après le Cubisme" (After Cubism) published in 1918.

== Post World War I ==
Le Corbusier, 1921, Nature morte (Still Life), oil on canvas, 54 x 81 cm, Musée National d'Art Moderne

Le Corbusier and Ozenfant were the creators of Purism. Fernand Léger was a principal associate. Purism was an attempt to restore regularity in a war-torn France post World War I. Unlike what they saw as 'decorative' fragmentation of objects in Cubism, Purism proposed a style of painting where elements were represented as robust simplified forms with minimal detail, while embracing technology and the machine.

Purism culminated in Le Corbusier's Pavillon de l'Esprit Nouveau (Pavilion of the New Spirit), constructed for the International Exhibition of Modern Decorative and Industrial Arts in 1925. This included the work of Cubists Juan Gris and Jacques Lipchitz. Following this exhibition the relationship between Le Corbusier and Ozenfant declined.

== L'Esprit Nouveau ==
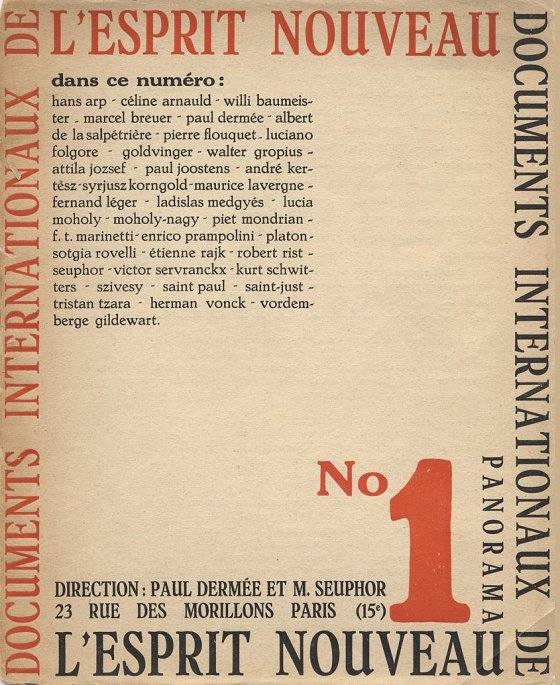
L'Esprit Nouveau, No. 1, October 1920. Edited by Paul Dermée and Michel Seuphor, later by Le Corbusier and Amédée Ozenfant. Published by Éditions de l'Esprit Nouveau, Paris

Amédée Ozenfant, 1921, Nature morte au verre de vin rouge (Still Life with Glass of Red Wine), oil on canvas, 50.6 x 61.2 cm, Kunstmuseum Basel

Ozenfant and Le Corbusier contributed extensively to an art magazine called L'Esprit Nouveau from 1920 to 1925 serving as a platform for propaganda towards their Purist movement.

== Purist Manifesto ==
The Purist Manifesto lays out the rules Ozenfant and Le Corbusier created to govern the Purist movement.

- Purism does not intend to be a scientific art, which it is in no sense.
- Cubism has become a decorative art of romantic ornamentism.
- There is a hierarchy in the arts: decorative art is at the base, the human figure at the summit.
- Painting is as good as the intrinsic qualities of its plastic elements, not their representative or narrative possibilities.
- Purism wants to conceive clearly, execute loyally, exactly without deceits; it abandons troubled conceptions, summary or bristling executions. A serious art must banish all techniques not faithful to the real value of the conception.
- Art consists in the conception before anything else.
- Technique is only a tool, humbly at the service of the conception.
- Purism fears the bizarre and the original. It seeks the pure element in order to reconstruct organized paintings that seem to be facts from nature herself.
- The method must be sure enough not to hinder the conception.
- Purism does not believe that returning to nature signifies the copying of nature.
- It admits all deformation is justified by the search for the invariant.
- All liberties are accepted in art except those that are unclear.

== See also ==
- Crystal Cubism
- Section d'Or
- Orphism
- De Stijl
- Tubism
- Raoul Albert La Roche
- Minimalism
