= Chandigarh =

Union territory and capital of Punjab and Haryana, India

- Union Territory and City
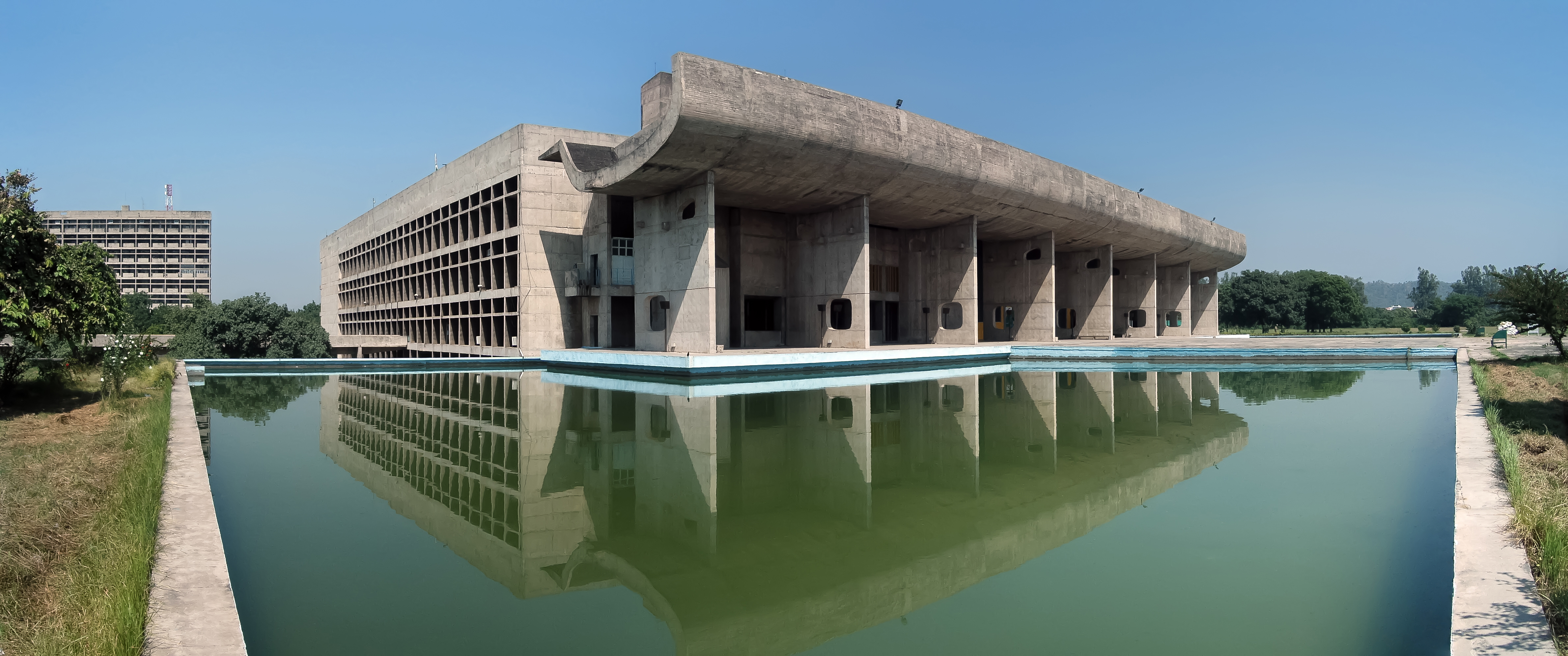
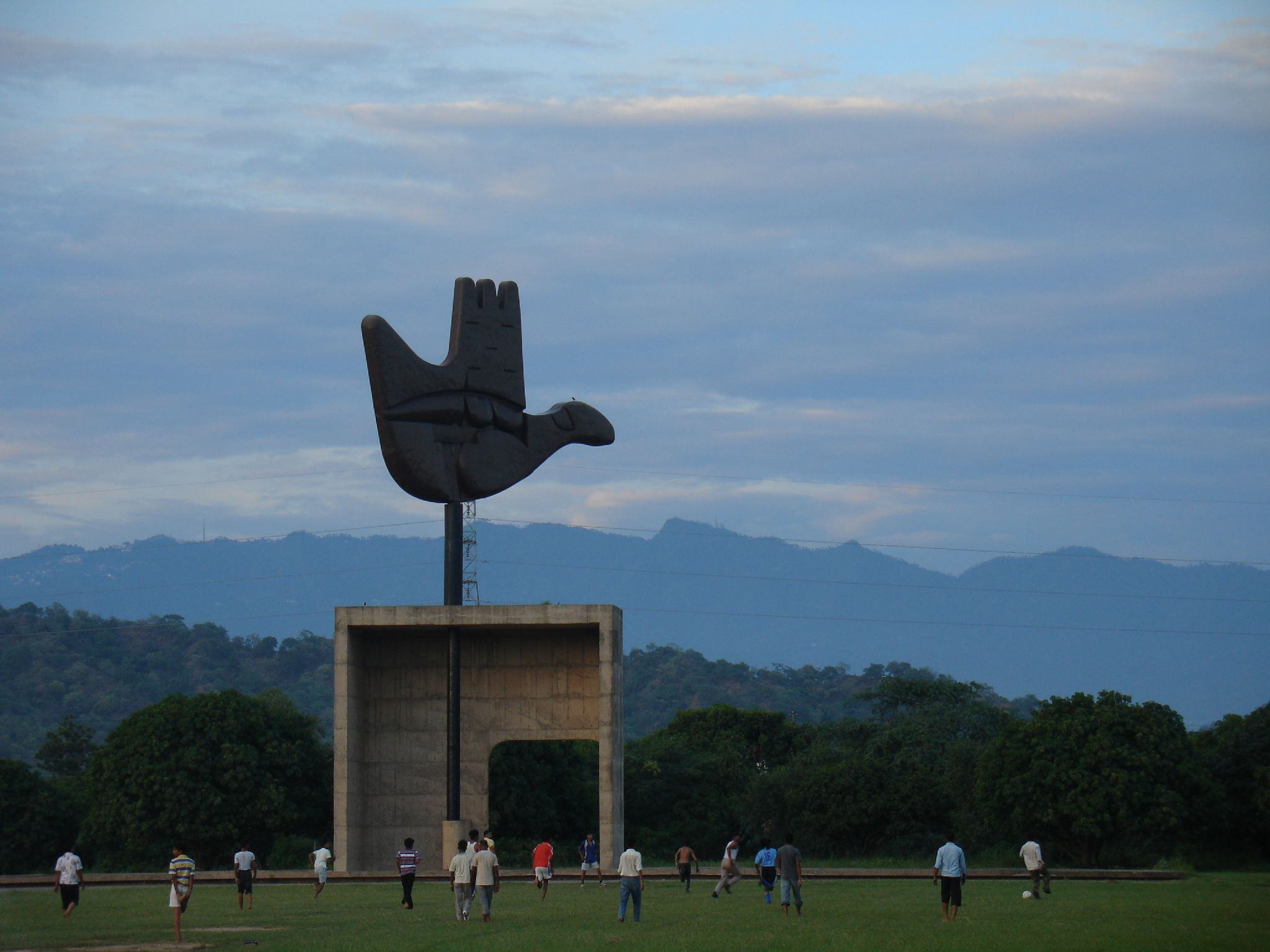
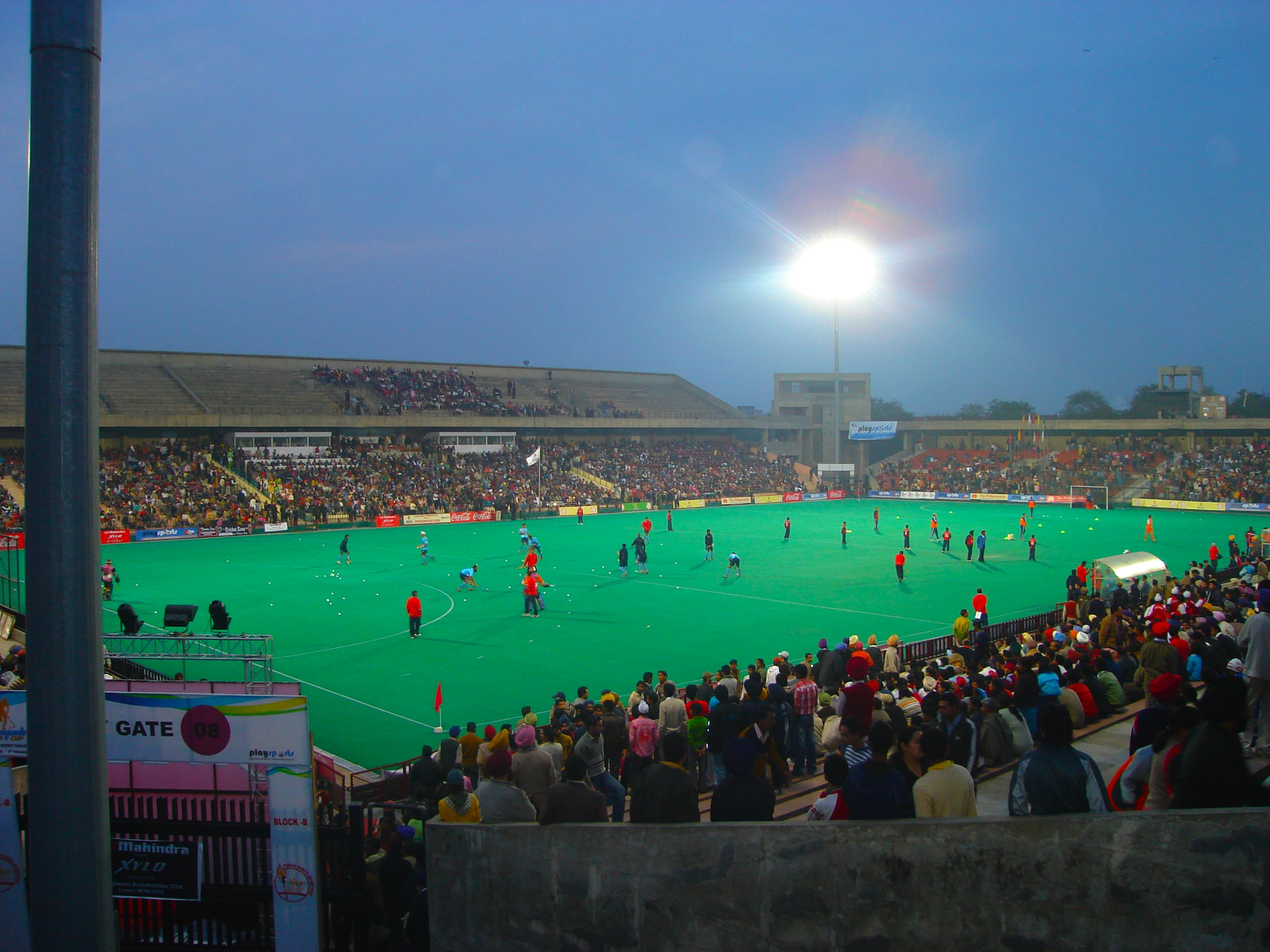
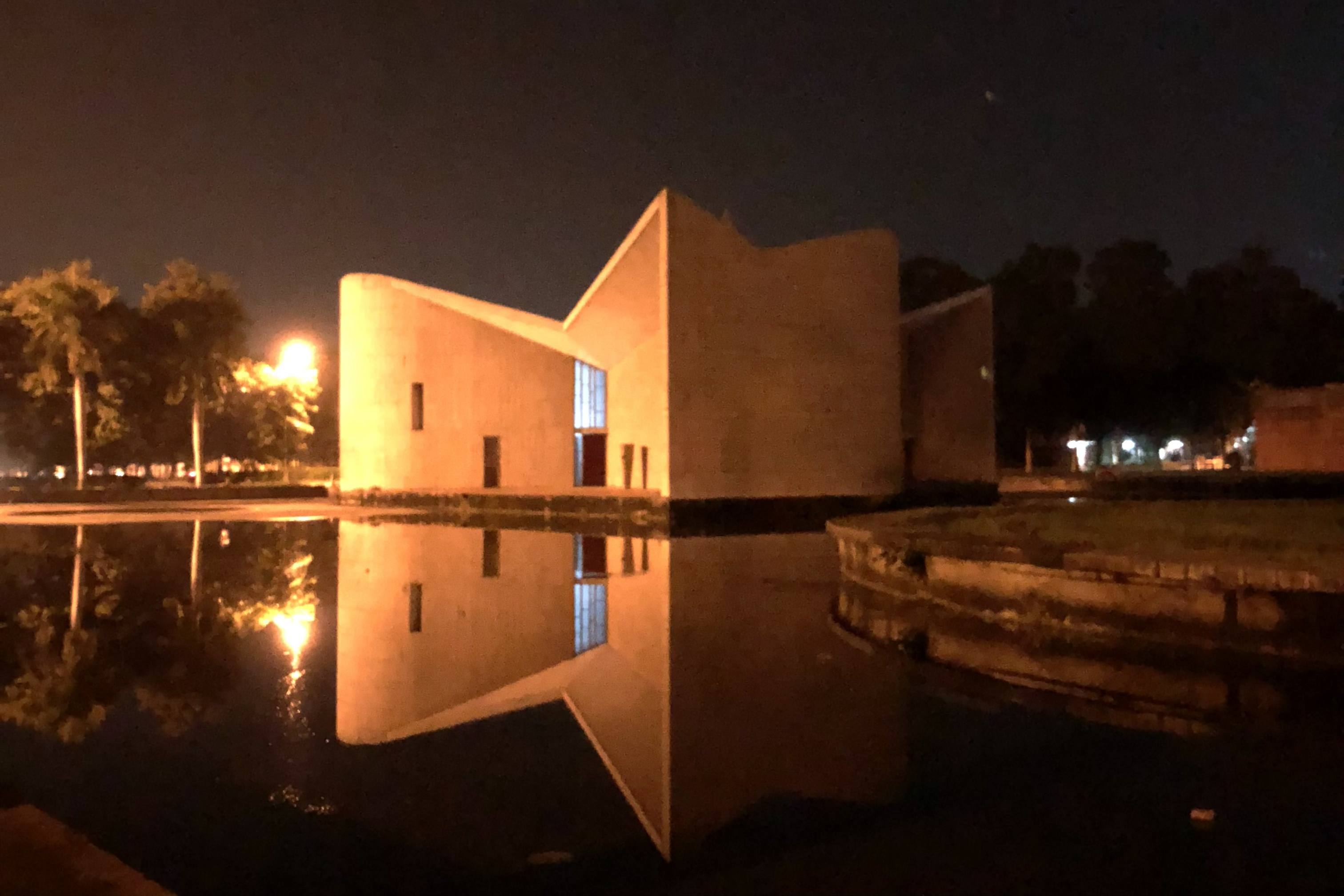
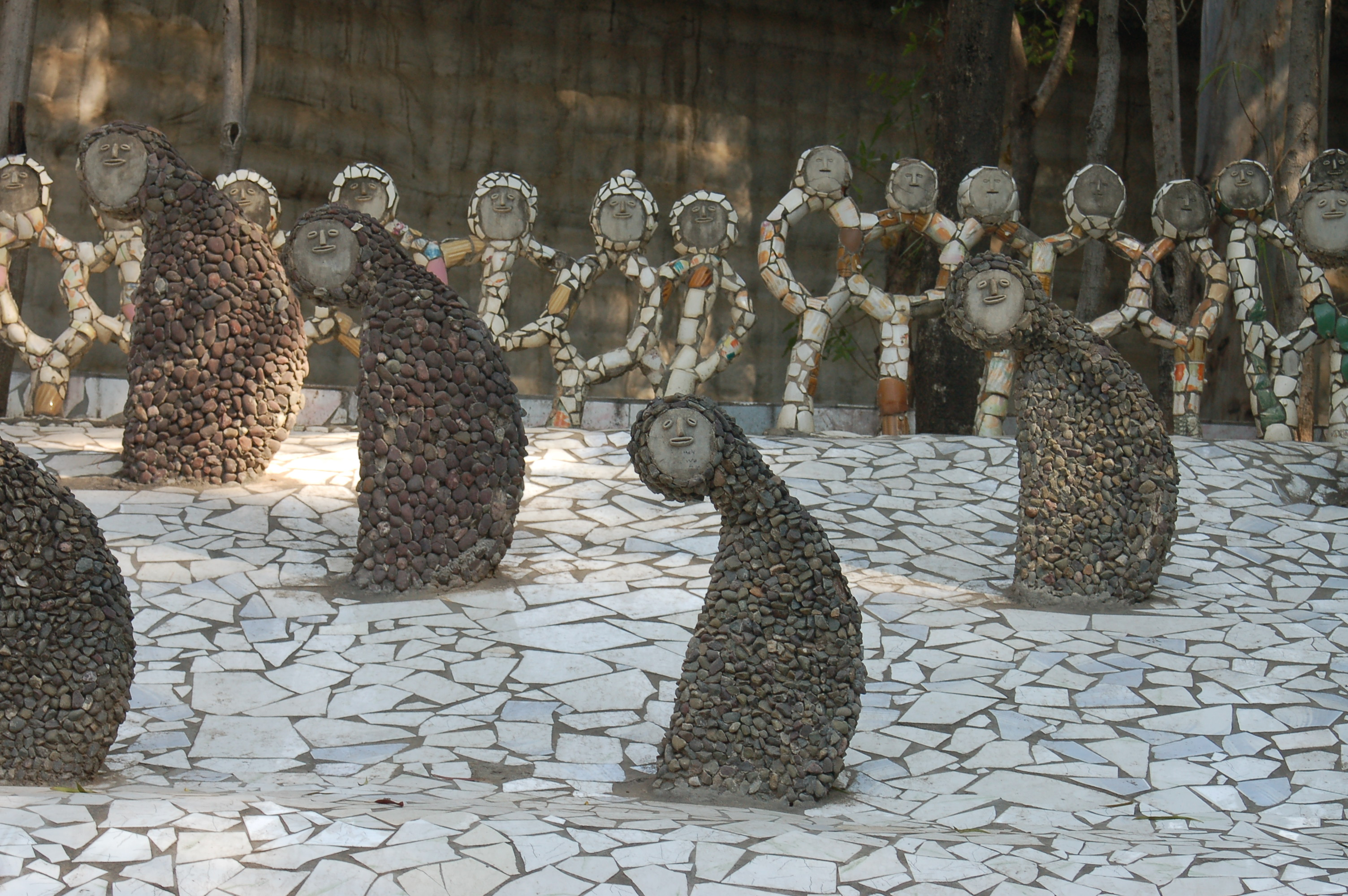
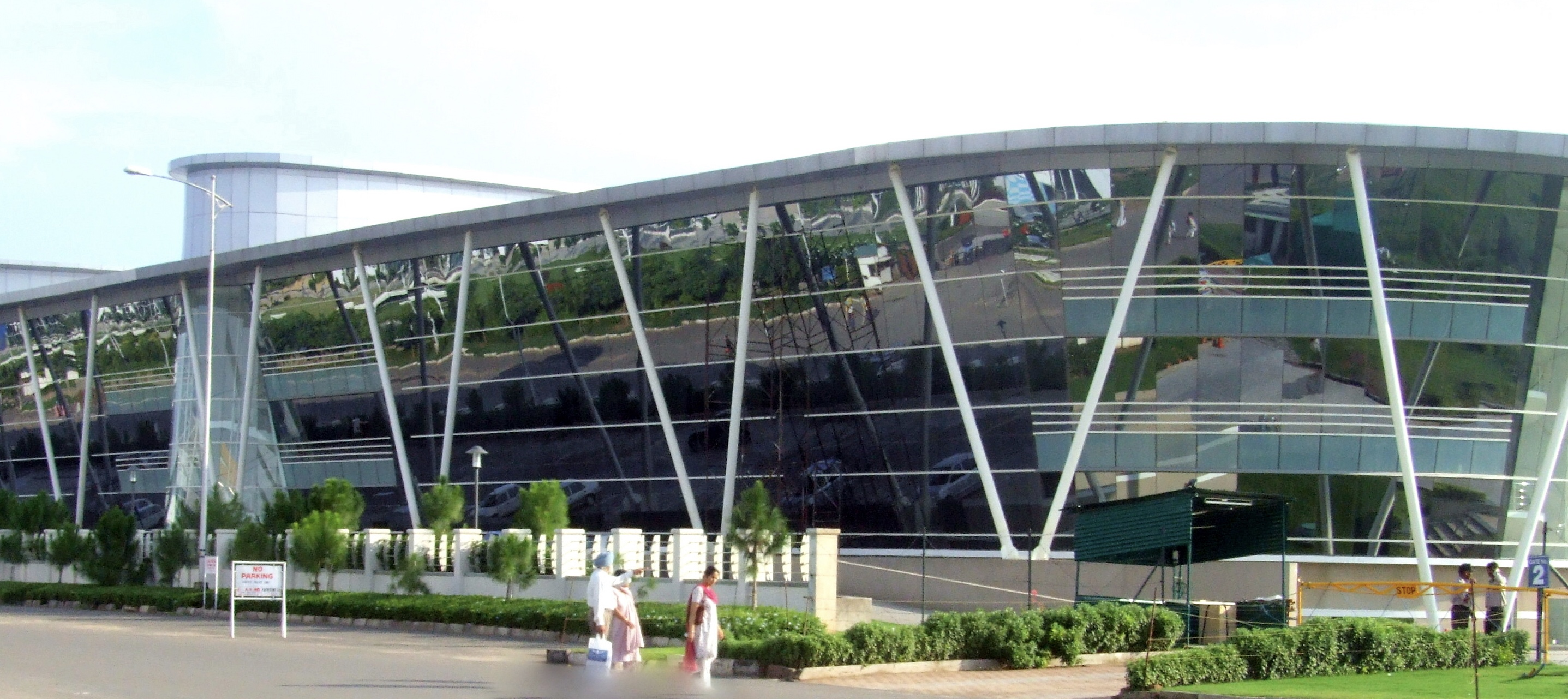
- Palace of Assembly Open Hand Monument Sector 42 Stadium Gandhi Bhawan at Panjab University Rock Garden of Chandigarh Chandigarh IT Park

- Emblem of Chandigarh
- Nickname: "The City of Beauty"
- Location of Chandigarh in India
- Coordinates: 30°44′00″N 76°46′47″E
- Country: India
- Formation: 7 October 1953
- Capital: Chandigarh
- Districts: 01

Government
  - Body: Government of Chandigarh
  - Chief Secretary: Rajesh Prasad, IAS (Adviser to the Administrator)

Area
  - Total: 114 km^{2} (44 sq mi)
  - Rank: 35th
- Elevation: 321 m (1,053 ft)
- Highest elevation (Unnamed point near Khuda Ali Sher Village): 479 m (1,572 ft)

Population (2011)
  - Total: ▲1,055,450
  - Rank: 31st
  - Density: 9,262/km^{2} (23,990/sq mi)
  - Urban: 1,025,682 (51st)
- Demonym: Chandigarhian

Language
  - Official: English

GDP
  - Total (2023–24): ▲₹0.49 trillion (US$5 billion)
  - Rank: 25th
  - Per capita: ▲₹430,119 (US$4,600) (4th)
- Time zone: UTC+05:30 (IST)
- ISO 3166 code: IN-CH
- Vehicle registration: CH01, CH02, CH03, CH04, PB01, HR70
- HDI (2023): ▲0.796 high (3rd)
- Literacy (2024): 93.7% (6th)
- Sex ratio (2011): 818♀/1000 ♂ (34th)
- Website: chandigarh.gov.in
- Symbols of Chandigarh
- Bird: Indian grey hornbill
- Flower: Dhak
- Fruit: Mango
- Mammal: Indian grey mongoose
- Tree: Mangifera indica
- List of Indian state and union territory symbols

Chandigarh (Note: Hindi and Panjabi: Caṇḍīgaṛha, pronounced [t͡ʃəɳˈɖiːɡəɽʱ]; lit. 'fortress of Chandi') is a city and union territory in northwestern India, serving as a shared capital for the states of Punjab and Haryana. Situated near the foothills of the Shivalik range of Himalayas, it borders Haryana to the east and Punjab in the remaining directions. Chandigarh constitutes the bulk of the Chandigarh Capital Region or Greater Chandigarh, which also includes the adjacent satellite cities of Panchkula in Haryana and Mohali in Punjab. It is located 260 km (162 miles) northwest of New Delhi and 229 km (143 miles) southeast of Amritsar and 104 km (64 miles) southwest of Shimla.

Chandigarh was established in the immediate aftermath of the independence of India in 1947 and the accompanying partition. Refugee and economic crises, and scattered administration, necessitated a new capital for the East Punjab state after the former capital of the undivided British Punjab province, Lahore, was ceded to newly formed Pakistan. A masterplan for a modernist city, to be developed on land in the erstwhile Ambala district, was prepared by Swiss-French architect Le Corbusier. Most of the city’s government buildings and housing were designed by a team of European and Indian architects headed by Corbusier. The initial phases of the city were constructed in the 1950s and 60s.

In 1966, the former state was reorganised and divided into the present-day states of Haryana and Punjab, with Chandigarh made into a union territory serving as the joint capital of both the states. Conflict over the city’s status has persisted since the reorganisation; it was originally allocated to Haryana and thereafter granted to Punjab in exchange for areas of the Punjab state, but has remained a union territory. Surveys indicate the city’s own inhabitants prefer the UT status. The region surrounding the city urbanised rapidly, and the satellite towns of Mohali and Panchkula were developed in Punjab and Haryana respectively.

Chandigarh was one of the first and most significant city-building projects of the post-war world. The city, and especially its Capitol Complex, was the culmination of Le Corbusier’s architectural career; the complex was designated a World Heritage Site by UNESCO as part of a global ensemble of Corbusier's buildings in 2016. Architectural and town planning elements of Chandigarh were replicated in other towns in India and elsewhere. (Note: These included Nangal and Talwara. The tree-planting work at Chandigarh became the blueprint for all future work of that kind in India. Chandigarh also partly inspired the creation of the city of Islamabad in neighbouring Pakistan.) The tri-city metropolitan area has a combined population of over 1,611,770. The city has one of the highest per capita incomes in the country. The union territory has the third-highest Human Development Index among Indian states and territories. In 2015, a survey by LG Electronics ranked it as the happiest city in India on the happiness index. In 2015, an article published by the BBC identified Chandigarh as one of the few master-planned cities in the world to have succeeded in terms of combining monumental architecture, cultural growth, and modernisation.

== Etymology ==
The name Chandigarh means "fort of Chandi" and is a compound of Chandi, which refers to the Hindu goddess Chandi, a manifestation of Shakti, and Garh, meaning stronghold or fortress. The name is taken from a village where a temple dedicated to goddess Chandi stood. The temple exists today at Chandi Mandir, on the outskirts of the city, in the neighbouring district of Panchkula in Haryana.

The motif or sobriquet of "The City of Beauty" was derived from the City Beautiful movement, which was a popular philosophy in North American urban planning during the 1890s and 1900s. Architect Albert Mayer, the initial planner of Chandigarh, lamented the American rejection of City Beautiful concepts and declared, "We want to create a beautiful city". The phrase was used as a logo in official publications in the 1970s and is now how the city describes itself.

== History ==
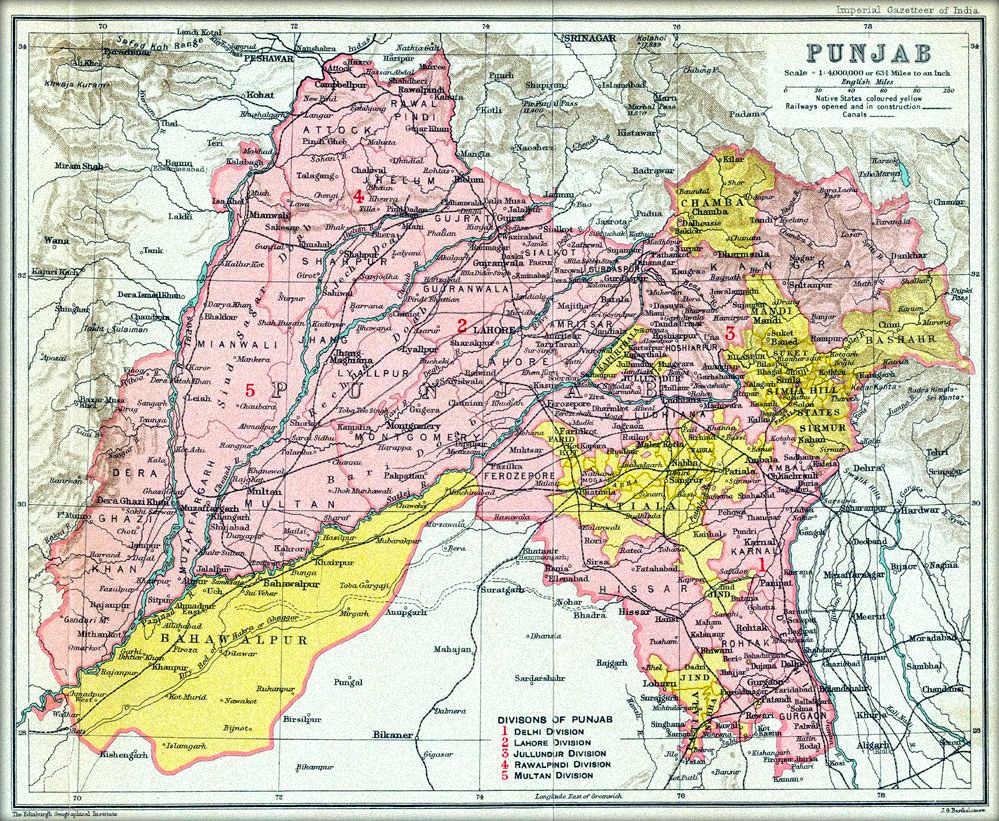
A map of the Punjab Province in colonial India (1909). During the Partition of India along the Radcliffe Line, the capital of the Punjab Province, Lahore, fell into West Punjab, Pakistan. The necessity to have a new capital for East Punjab in India then, led to the development of Chandigarh.

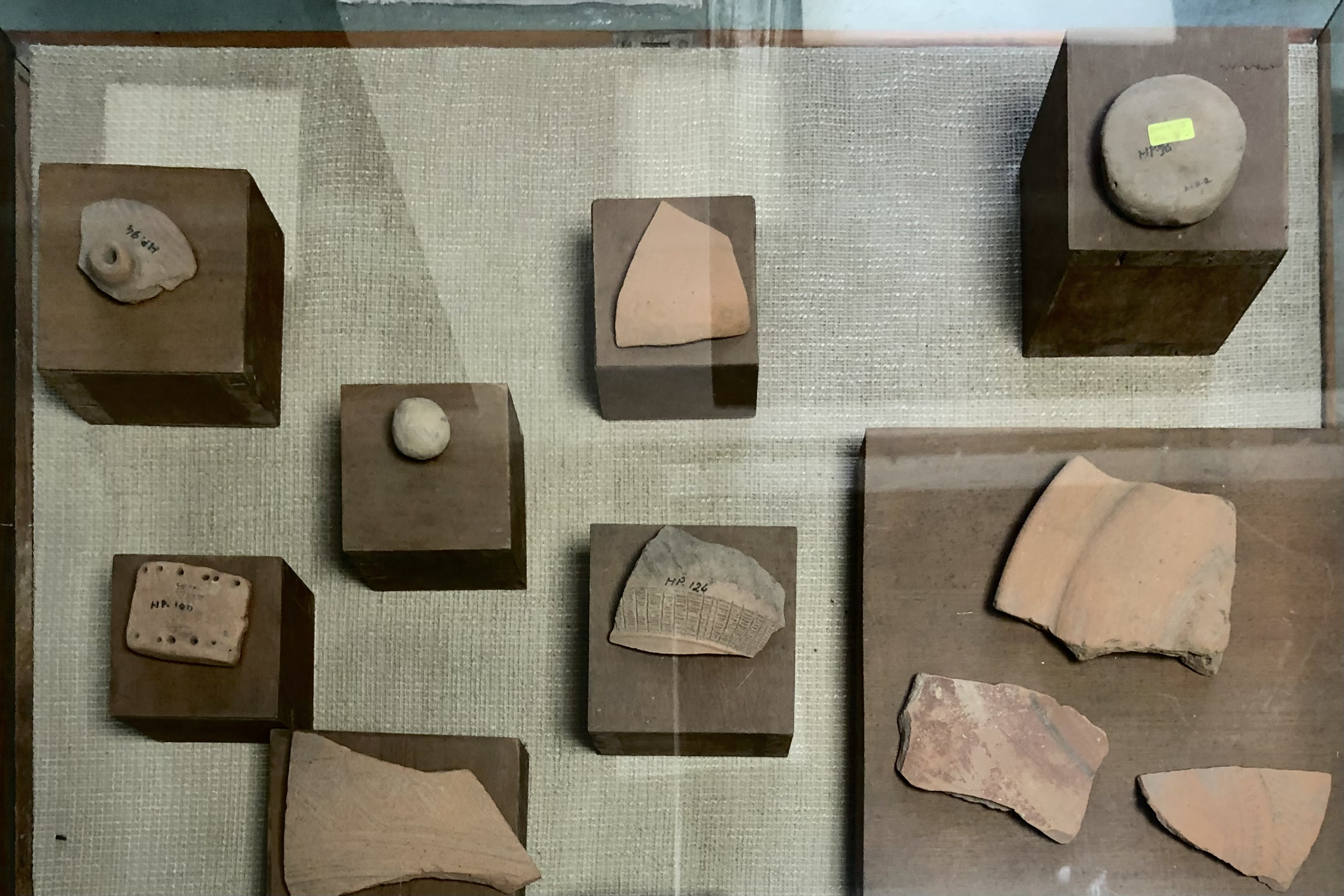
Indus valley artefacts excavated from Sector 17, Chandigarh

=== Partition and independence ===
The establishment of the city of Chandigarh was the result of the crises and chaos in northwestern India in the aftermath of its independence from British colonial rule. During the partition of India in 1947, the province of Punjab was divided into two: the majority Hindu and Sikh eastern portion that remained in India and the majority Muslim western portion that became part of Pakistan. Lahore, the provincial capital of undivided Punjab, though fiercely contested during partition, was eventually ceded to Pakistan. The provincial government of independent India's East Punjab state was left without an administrative center or capital.

The loss of Lahore, the need for the rehabilitation of refugees from West Pakistan and a mounting exodus of business communities from the state created a sense of urgency. Shimla, the former summer capital of both British India and the Punjab province, partially housed the government of East Punjab state. Shimla's inability to fully contain the administrative machinery resulted in government offices to be scattered at several places across the state, (Note: In Jalandhar, Ambala, Kalka, Kasauli, Dagshai etc.) imposing difficulties and costs on the public as well as the government.

=== Conception and initial planning ===
It was decided by representatives of the government of India and of the state of East Punjab to build a new capital for the state, because attaching capital functions to an existing city—all of which were considered inadequate and had swollen in size due to migration of refugees from West Pakistan—was considered as costly as building a new city.

The new capital needed to have enough space for government machinery, for resettlement of refugees and their businesses, for expansion, and adequate rail, road and air connectivity; it also had to assuage the psychological loss of partition, its construction supposed to stimulate the state's devastated economy, as well as being a 'symbolic gesture' of unity, stability, and an assertion of India's newfound sovereignty. India's erstwhile Prime Minister Jawaharlal Nehru personally endorsed the project, remarking:

"Let this be a new town, symbolic of the freedom of India, unfettered by the traditions of the past … an expression of the nation's faith in the future."

The capital was to be located in the most populous part of the state, between the Doaba and Ambala districts, and projected to hold about 500,000 people. (Note: This projection was made for the East Punjab government by its chief engineer, Parmeshwari Lal Varma, based on applications by prospective businesses and residents, anticipated migration by government employees and growth estimates. This projection was opposed by civil servant Anthony Leocadia Fletcher, who favoured a smaller plan for 100,000.) Several existing cities and towns across the state were considered for the possible development of the new capital, but all rejected for different reasons. (Note: Shimla was ruled out because of its harsh winters, its hilly location near the margins of the East Punjab state and its limited connectivity and accessibility. Amritsar and Jalandhar were rejected because of their proximity to the border with newly-formed Pakistan, with which the prospect of war was considered inevitable; additionally, Amritsar's drainage system was also poor. Ludhiana was rejected for its poor infrastructure, especially communications and connectivity, and its primarily industrial character, while Ambala was ruled out because of its primarily military character, and absence of utilities. Karnal and Phillaur were also considered and ruled out.) Political lobbying also made the selection of an existing city as the new capital difficult. The absence of political consensus on the location of the new capital and the large costs involved threatened the project.

In 1948, three possible sites were settled upon, one lying in the Ambala district, one in Ludhiana, and one, the most preferred of the three, being partially in Ambala and Patiala state (which was then not part of the East Punjab state). The first site, in Ambala district's Kharar tehsil, was ultimately selected to be the location of the new capital after aerial reconnaissance by Parmeshwari Lal Varma and Prem Nath Thapar. (Note: Varma was the chief engineer of the East Punjab government, and Thapar was the administrative head of the Chandigarh capital project. The two steered Chandigarh's early development.) The name of the new city derived from a temple dedicated to Hindu goddess Chandi present in one of these villages. The location was praised by the later team of the city's architects for being beautiful and practical.

Agricultural lands, including large mango groves, of fifty-eight villages with a population of 21,000 people were to be affected by the construction of the city, involving the displacement of many of them. (Note: Some of these villages are still inhabited, some within the modern blocks of some sectors, including Burail and Attawa, others on the margins of the city.) The affected villagers, encouraged and supported by political parties (such as the Socialist Party and Akali Dal), began agitating against the project. Political opposition to the project also stemmed from a desire for relocation of the new capital to sites favourable to the opponents. The government reached an agreement with the affected villagers in October 1950, and established a local committee to advise on rehabilitation of displaced people, thus ending the agitation.

=== Masterplan ===
==== Mayer plan ====
It was decided by the state government that a town planner for Chandigarh would be selected after interviewing several of them in England. (Note: Varma had suggested a limited international competition to find the best talent, an idea that was opposed by Fletcher, who suggested hiring an English town planner instead, preferring Patrick Abercrombie for the job. Abercrombie had consented to be involved in the project during talks with the Indian embassy in London.) However, Nehru suggested that a town planner already present in India and familiar with it be hired instead, and recommended two such people. (Note: Nehru recommended Otto Koenigsberger, an exiled Jewish architect from Germany, and Albert Mayer, an American town planner. Both Koenigsberger and Mayer had lived in India for several years and worked in various capacities on many different cities in the country. PN Thapar met both of them in New Delhi in December 1949 to negotiate their involvement.) One of them—Albert Mayer, an American town planner—was selected in December 1949 to design the master plan of Chandigarh. Mayer's recruitment received extensive international media attention. Mayer enlisted several experts from the US to aid him in preparing the masterplan of Chandigarh, including Matthew Nowicki, a US-based Polish architect, who was to work on the city's architectural design.

Mayer produced a fan-shaped plan, spreading southward between the Patiala-ki-rao and Sukhna Cho streams, with the capitol located on a promontory in Sukhna's fork at the upper margin, a university at the very north, a railway station to the east, an industrial area to the southeast and a commercial block in the center. The city was to be made up of several neighbourhood units, or superblocks, arranged in districts of various shapes roughly one-by-half kilometre in size, each containing residences, bazaar, schools, parks, health centres, theatres and meeting halls. The superblocks were to be arranged in a curvilinear street layout with adequate road space for future motor traffic. Mayer's plan was based on the ideals of the Garden City movement and the Radburn idea.

While Mayer provided a masterplan and Nowicki gave a detailed draft for one neighbourhood unit, Chandigarh also required an architect to develop the architectural design of the city and its structures. Nowicki had also prepared a preliminary design for the capitol complex, and had agreed to join the city's architectural development independently of Mayer. In August 1950, Nowicki died in a plane crash, and Mayer was unlikely to be able to execute the masterplan without his assistance. This, coupled with Mayer's extended leaves from the state and mounting expenses due to adverse USD exchange rates, resulted in Mayer—who was still keen on continuing the project—being dropped from the plan. (Note: Mayer was informed of the decision in January 1951. He continued to work on other projects in India until 1960.)

==== Corbusier plan ====
Between November and December 1950, Thapar and Varma travelled to Europe to find replacements and recruited a four-member team headed by Swiss-French architect Le Corbusier, also including English couple-duo Maxwell Fry and Jane Drew, and Corbusier's cousin Pierre Jeanneret. (Note: In initial talks in Paris, Corbusier was unreceptive of the plan. Fry and Drew were propositioned in London, with Drew readily agreeing to the plan albeit unable to join it immediately. Corbusier was approached again, with Fry and Drew on board, and agreed this time contingent on the inclusion of Jeanneret.) Fry, Drew and Jeanneret were to work at Chandigarh for three years, while Corbusier would make two visits every year, each lasting one month. The association of the city with Corbusier catapulted it into global limelight. Corbusier came to India in February 1951, and joined Fry and Jeanneret who had arrived earlier. They were joined by Indian staff in Shimla, including a team of young Indian architects and town-planners who were to learn from them as much as assist them. (Note: The Indian architects and planners included Eulie Chowdhury, J.S. Dethe, Narindar Lamba, Jeet Malhotra, B. P. Mathur, Piloo Mody, A. R. Prabhawalkar, and Manmohan Nath Sharma, with Aditya Prakash also joining later. Jugal Kishore Choudhury joined to design the university plan.)

Although told to adhere to Mayer's masterplan, the new team considered it inadequate and made significant modifications, much to Mayer's dismay as he tried in vain to retain it. Corbusier assumed control of the masterplan and designed buildings of the capitol complex, while the rest of the team directed construction work and designed other buildings of the city. Key components of the previous plan were incorporated into the new one—the positions of the central commercial block, the railway station, the industrial area, and the capitol complex remained roughly similar; the university was moved to the west, the superblocks were retained, but expanded, standardised and named 'sectors'. The overall density was increased by 20%. The earlier curvilinear street plan was replaced with a rectilinear grid plan, with a seven-tiered road system consisting the highway, the central axes, arterial roads, market roads, sector circulation roads, residential streets and pedestrian walkways. The new plan was quickly accepted by officials.

The capitol complex was designed to contain four main buildings: the Palace of Assembly, the High Court of Justice, the Secretariat, and a fourth structure—earlier the Governor's Palace and later Museum of Knowledge—whose construction was deferred. Also included in it were several monuments, notably the Monument of the Open Hand. Initial plan envisioned the capitol complex to dominate the city, but in later plans artificial hills were used to visually separate the two. It was to be independent India's 'answer' to the British built complex in New Delhi. The city centre was designed by Corbusier to contain commercial and administrative buildings with a central pedestrian plaza.

=== Construction ===
A schedule for construction was prepared soon after the takeover of the project by Corbusier's team. The first structures to be built were temporary quarters for the engineers and architects. 30 sectors were to be constructed in the first phase, and another 17 in the second phase. Several laws were passed 1952 onwards to regulate development within the city and in its 5-mile radius (expanded later to 10), and to preserve the city's planned character. By September 1953, all state government departments and staff had been shifted from Shimla to Chandigarh. The city was built to be the state's capital all year round, abandoning the British practice of moving the provincial government to Shimla during the summer. On 7 October 1953, the capital was officially inaugurated in a ceremony presided over by President Rajendra Prasad. The construction was done on a tight budget, primarily using locally available materials, extensive manual labour and minimal machinery.

A committee was set up under Mohinder Singh Randhawa for landscaping of the city, and an elaborate landscaping plan was devised. In 1954, the Panjab University, which had been functioning in a widely scattered area until then, (Note: Its administrative centre was located in Solan, with departments in Amritsar, Delhi, Jalandhar, Hoshiarpur and Ludhiana.) purchased over 300 acres of land in sector 14 where a self-contained permanent campus was built for it in the late 1950s and early 1960s. The 1956 merger of PEPSU with the Punjab state shot up construction costs due to requirements of extra offices and housing in the city, and caused revisions in the assembly building's design. In the 1960s, a medical research center and college of engineering were established in sector 12, two government colleges, one for men and one for women, were built in sector 11, and a polytechnic institute was created in sector 26. The Chandi Mandir military cantonment and an industrial township in Pinjore were built to the northeast of the city, despite objections from Corbusier. During excavations for the city's construction in the 1950s and 60s, artefacts, a cemetery and a settlement belonging to the Indus Valley civilisation were discovered around present-day sector 17.

Sector 22 was the first sector to be developed. The large population of construction workers that came to build the city lived in self-built small mud or brick shacks during this period. 13 types of government housing, from the Chief Minister's to those for low income employees, were developed by Fry, Drew and Jeanneret. Following the departure of Fry and Drew, some house types were also developed by Jeet Malhotra, Manmohan Nath Sharma, Aditya Prakash and Eulie Chowdhury. Jeanneret, Chowdhury and others also designed several types of furniture influenced by local craftsmanship for use in the city's public buildings, which were manufactured from local hardwood by carpenters across northern India. Jeanneret was appointed chief architect and town planner for Chandigarh and lived in the city until 1965.

The Secretariat was the first of the capitol complex buildings to be completed. The High Court became functional in March 1955, although modifications and additions to it continued till later. (Note: By 1962, an annexe for additional courthouses was built, the earlier white portico walls were repainted in bright contrasting colours, and tapestries designed by Corbusier and weaved in Kashmir were added to sound-proof courtrooms.) The Assembly building containing two legislative chambers enclosed within a square exterior—a hyperbolic assembly chamber and a pyramid-topped council chamber—was completed in 1962. A ceremonial door hand painted by Corbusier was installed at the Assembly Building in 1964. Work on foundations of the fourth building set against the hills to complete the architectural composition of the complex, initially designed to be the governor's residence (which was disapproved by Nehru for being 'undemocratic') and changed later to a museum, was begun in the 1960s but the structure was never built. Two of the six monuments planned in the Capitol Complex remain incomplete. These include Geometric Hill and Martyrs Memorial. Drawings were made, and they were begun in 1956, but they were never completed. Corbusier remained committed to Chandigarh's development until his death in 1965.

=== Reorganisation and afterwards ===
In 1966, after a long drawn movement by factions of the Akali Dal for an exclusively Punjabi state—and counter demands by Haryanvi and Himachali leaders—the former bilingual state was divided along linguistic lines: the northwestern areas became Punjab, the southeastern ones Haryana, and the northeastern hilly areas were transferred to Himachal Pradesh. Chandigarh was originally allotted to Haryana based on its Hindi-speaking majority per the 1961 census, but was later converted into a union territory instead, owing to apprehensions of Sikh disaffection with the city going to Haryana. It became the shared capital of Punjab and Haryana, both of which were quick to extend their claims over it. In 1970, after deliberations about possible resolutions including a division of the city, prime minister Indira Gandhi assigned it to Punjab with Haryana to be given the Fazilka tehsil and granted funds for a new capital as compensation.

The administration of the union territory, which also included 34 villages adjacent to the city, came under the direct control of the union government, and the city became the centre of three governments. Periodic unofficial reports after the reorganisation suggested that the people of Chandigarh wanted the city to stay a union territory. According to a 1982 survey, 80% of the city's residents preferred it staying a UT. In 1985, terms of an unimplemented wider accord granted the city to the state of Punjab, with Haryana slated to get 70,000 acres of land from Punjab in return.

By 1971, 11–15% of Chandigarh's population was living in illegal settlements. Transit colonies for slum-dwellers were set up on the margins of the city, becoming permanent with time. In the 1970s, city officials discovered a sculpture park built by public works employee and artist Nek Chand who had been secretly building it since 1957 using various materials—rocks found in the hills and waterbodies around the city, discarded materials from pre-existing villages, and waste generated by the city's construction—on a piece of forest land adjacent to the capitol complex. The park was named 'Rock Garden' and inaugurated in 1976, receiving national and international attention in the 1980s. In the late 1980s and 1990s, attempts by the city authorities to demolish the garden were thwarted by public protests.

Funding for the Open Hand monument, whose construction had been delayed due to financial constraints, was sanctioned in 1972. It was completed in 1985 and the motif was adopted and vigorously promoted as the official symbol of the city in the 1980s, with smaller monuments containing the icon built at other places such that the sign became ubiquitous in the city. (Note: It represents, according to Corbusier, 'the Second Machine Age.' In private correspondence with Nehru, Corbusier also projected it as a symbol of non-alignment. Another Open Hand monument was envisioned at Bhakra Dam in the early 1950s, but never built.)

The city is surrounded by several satellite towns that depend on it for services and facilities. Punjab built the town of Mohali in an area originally set aside for greenbelt southwest of Chandigarh, and Haryana developed Panchkula to the city's southeast (in addition to the already built Chandimandir cantonment to its east), both with the aim of reinforcing their claims on the city. (Note: Other towns in the larger inter-state Chandigarh region include Kharar, Kurali, Pinjore, Kalka, Morinda, Naraingarh, Parwanoo, Zirakpur, Baddi and Mullanpur.) The villages in the union territory saw rapid urbanisation. In the late 1970s and 1980s, efforts were made towards more integrated regional urban planning in the wider Chandigarh Capital Region.

== Geography ==
Map of Chandigarh

=== Location ===
Chandigarh is located by the foothills of the Shivalik Range of the Himalayas in northwest India. It covers an area of approximately 114 km^{2}. It borders the states of Punjab and Haryana. The exact geographic coordinates of Chandigarh are 30.74°N 76.79°E. It has an average elevation of 321 metres (1053 ft).

The city, lying in the northern plains, includes a vast area of flat, fertile land. Its northeast covers sections of Bhabar, while the remainder of its terrain is part of the Terai. Its surrounding cities are Mohali, New Chandigarh, Patiala, Zirakpur and Rupnagar in Punjab, Panchkula and Ambala in Haryana and Shimla and Solan in Himachal Pradesh.

Chandigarh is situated 44 km (28 miles) north of Ambala, 229 km (143 miles) southeast of Amritsar, and 250 km (156 miles) north of Delhi.

=== Climate ===
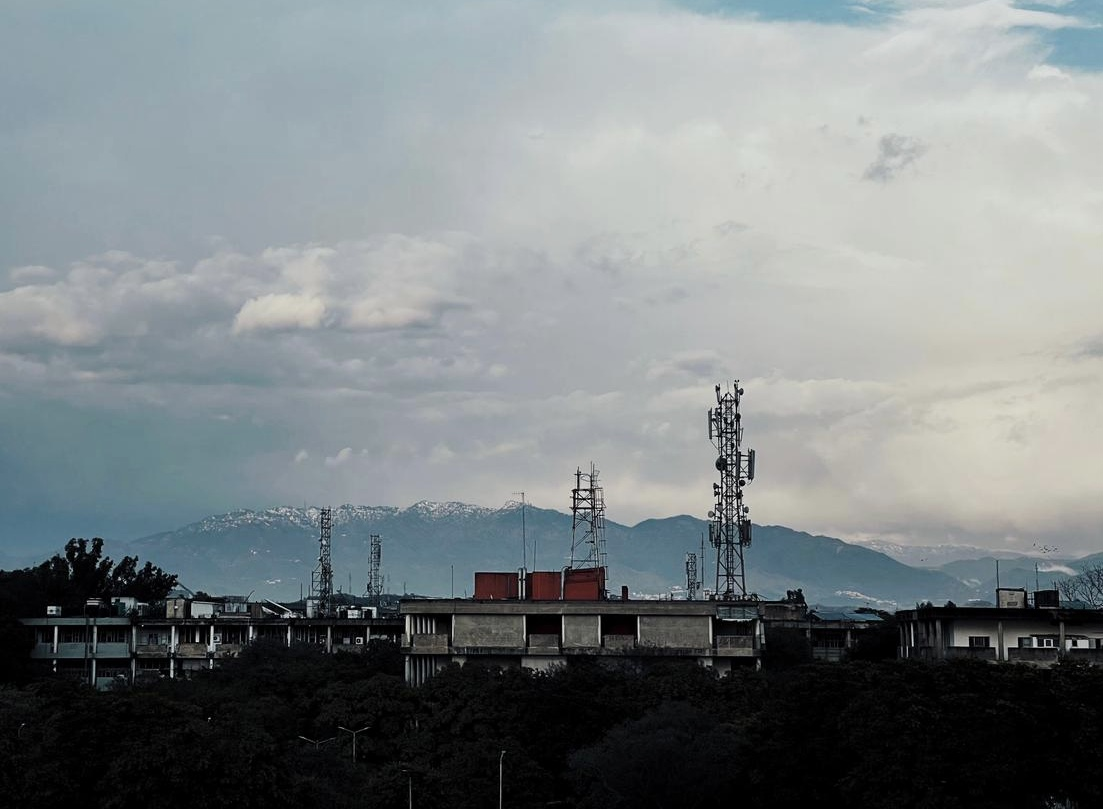
Chandigarh skyline in winter, with light snowfall on the peaks of Shivalik hills

Chandigarh, India

Climate chart (precipitation, max. and min. temperature)
J	F	M	A	M	J	J	A	S	O	N	D
38 18 7	37 23 10	27 28 15	18 35 20	27 39 25	147 38 27	276 34 27	273 33 26	155 33 24	14 32 18	5.2 27 12	22 22 8
- █ Average max. and min. temperatures in °C
- █ Precipitation totals in mm
- Source: NOAA
Imperial conversion
J	F	M	A	M	J	J	A	S	O	N	D
1.5 65 45	1.5 73 51	1.1 82 58	0.7 94 69	1.1 101 76	5.8 100 80	11 93 80	11 92 79	6.1 91 76	0.6 90 65	0.2 81 54	0.9 72 46
- █ Average max. and min. temperatures in °F
- █ Precipitation totals in inches

Chandigarh has a humid subtropical climate (Köppen: Cwa) characterised by a seasonal rhythm: very hot summers, mild winters, unreliable rainfall, and great temperature variation (−1 to 45 °C or 30.2 to 113.0 °F). The average annual rainfall is 1,038.4 mm or 40.88 in. The city also receives occasional winter rains from the Western Disturbance originating over the Mediterranean Sea. The western disturbances bring rain predominantly from mid-December until the end of April, which can be heavier sometimes with strong wind and hail if the weather turns colder (during March–April months), which usually proves disastrous to local crops. Cold northwesterly winds usually tend to come from the Himalayas that lie to the north, which receive snowfall during wintertime.

Climate data for Chandigarh (1991–2020 normals, extremes 1954–present)
Month	Jan	Feb	Mar	Apr	May	Jun	Jul	Aug	Sep	Oct	Nov	Dec	Year
Record high °C (°F)	27.7 (81.9)	32.8 (91.0)	37.8 (100.0)	43.3 (109.9)	46.7 (116.1)	45.3 (113.5)	42.0 (107.6)	39.0 (102.2)	37.5 (99.5)	37.0 (98.6)	34.0 (93.2)	28.5 (83.3)	46.7 (116.1)
Mean maximum °C (°F)	23.6 (74.5)	27.2 (81.0)	33.7 (92.7)	39.5 (103.1)	42.9 (109.2)	43.0 (109.4)	38.5 (101.3)	35.9 (96.6)	35.5 (95.9)	34.2 (93.6)	30.6 (87.1)	27.5 (81.5)	42.7 (108.9)
Mean daily maximum °C (°F)	18.2 (64.8)	22.6 (72.7)	28.0 (82.4)	34.6 (94.3)	38.6 (101.5)	37.7 (99.9)	34.1 (93.4)	33.2 (91.8)	32.9 (91.2)	32.0 (89.6)	27.0 (80.6)	22.1 (71.8)	29.9 (85.8)
Daily mean °C (°F)	12.7 (54.9)	16.5 (61.7)	21.4 (70.5)	27.5 (81.5)	31.7 (89.1)	32.2 (90.0)	30.5 (86.9)	29.7 (85.5)	28.7 (83.7)	25.2 (77.4)	19.7 (67.5)	15.1 (59.2)	24.1 (75.4)
Mean daily minimum °C (°F)	7.2 (45.0)	10.4 (50.7)	14.7 (58.5)	20.3 (68.5)	24.7 (76.5)	26.7 (80.1)	26.9 (80.4)	26.2 (79.2)	24.4 (75.9)	18.4 (65.1)	12.3 (54.1)	8.0 (46.4)	18.2 (64.8)
Mean minimum °C (°F)	3.4 (38.1)	6.1 (43.0)	9.6 (49.3)	15.5 (59.9)	19.6 (67.3)	21.0 (69.8)	23.0 (73.4)	23.5 (74.3)	21.0 (69.8)	13.3 (55.9)	8.3 (46.9)	4.5 (40.1)	2.9 (37.2)
Record low °C (°F)	0.0 (32.0)	0.0 (32.0)	4.2 (39.6)	7.8 (46.0)	13.4 (56.1)	14.8 (58.6)	14.2 (57.6)	17.2 (63.0)	14.3 (57.7)	9.4 (48.9)	3.7 (38.7)	0.0 (32.0)	0.0 (32.0)
Average rainfall mm (inches)	37.8 (1.49)	37.3 (1.47)	27.4 (1.08)	17.5 (0.69)	26.8 (1.06)	146.7 (5.78)	275.6 (10.85)	273.0 (10.75)	154.6 (6.09)	14.2 (0.56)	5.2 (0.20)	22.3 (0.88)	1,038.4 (40.88)
Average rainy days	2.3	3.0	2.2	1.9	2.2	6.5	9.8	11.1	6.0	0.8	0.5	1.3	47.5
Average relative humidity (%) (at 17:30 IST)	65	53	45	27	24	39	65	70	65	50	53	62	52
Average dew point °C (°F)	8 (46)	10 (50)	13 (55)	14 (57)	14 (57)	20 (68)	26 (79)	26 (79)	25 (77)	19 (66)	12 (54)	9 (48)	16 (61)
Average ultraviolet index	4	5	6	8	8	8	7	7	6	6	5	4	6
Source 1: India Meteorological Department
Source 2: Weather AtlasTime and Date

Chandigarh has been ranked 27th best "National Clean Air City" (under Category 1 >10L Population cities) in India.

=== Wildlife and biodiversity ===
Most of Chandigarh is covered by dense banyan and eucalyptus plantations. Ashoka, cassia, mulberry and other trees flourish in the forested ecosystem. The city is surrounded by forests that sustain many animal and plant species. Deer, sambars, barking deer, parrots, woodpeckers, and peacocks inhabit the protected forests. Sukhna Lake hosts a variety of ducks and geese and attracts migratory birds from parts of Siberia and Japan in the winter season. The Parrot Bird Sanctuary Chandigarh provides a home to a large number of parrots. Sukhna Wildlife Sanctuary was declared a wildlife sanctuary in 1998.

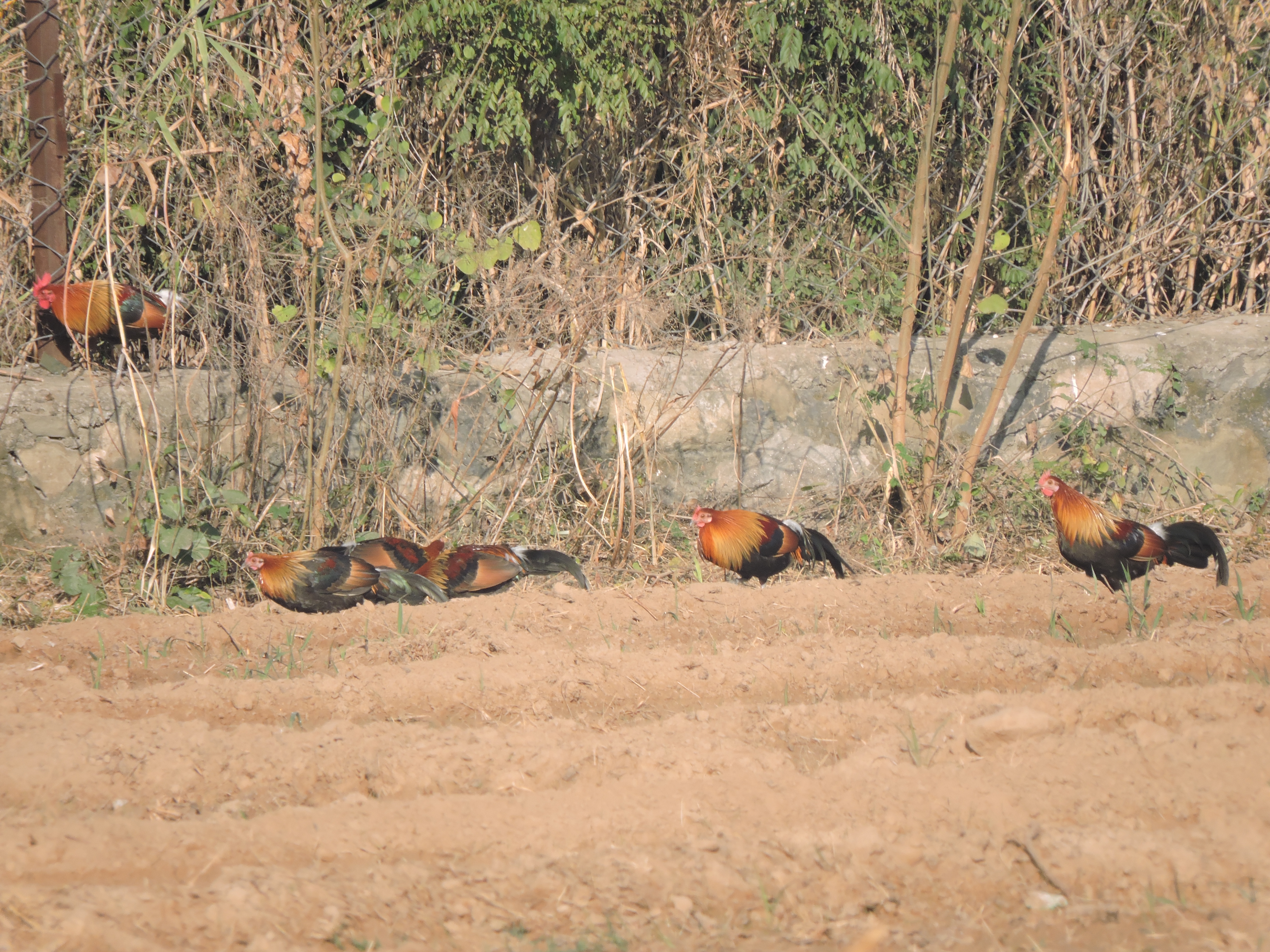
Junglefowl, Sukhna Wildlife Sanctuary, Chandigarh

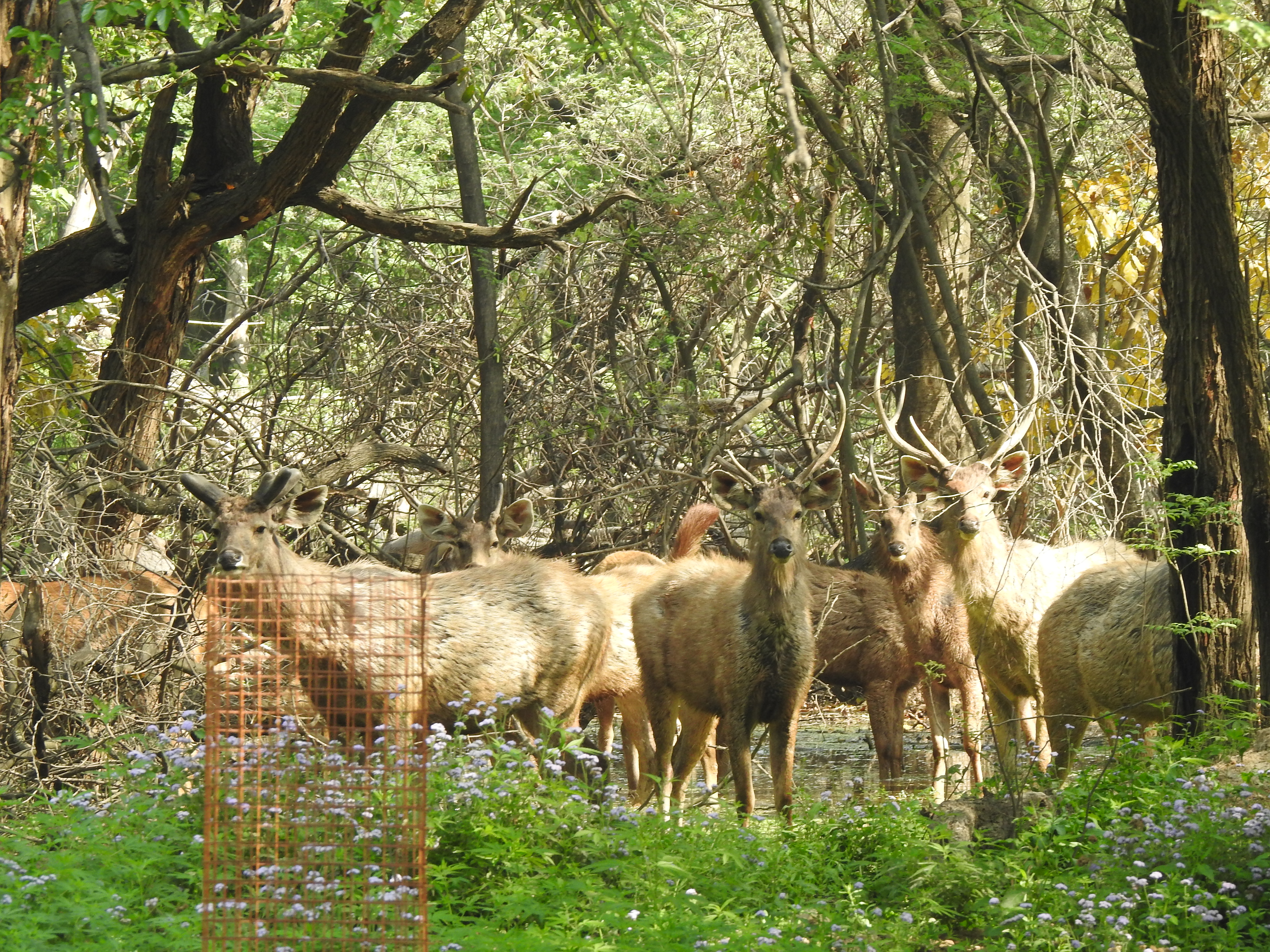
Sambar deer in City Forest Park, Chandigarh

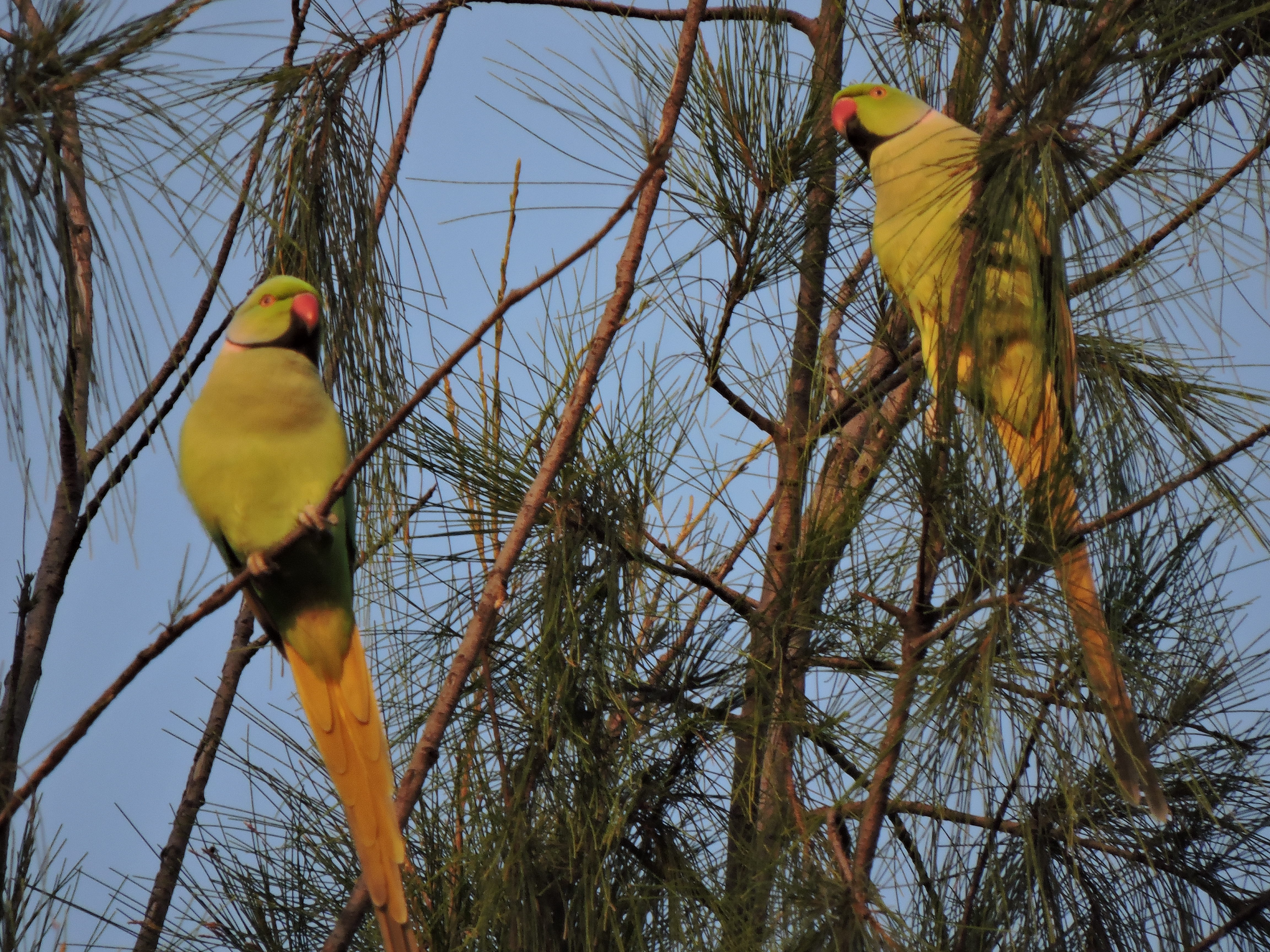
Parakeets at the Parrot Bird Sanctuary

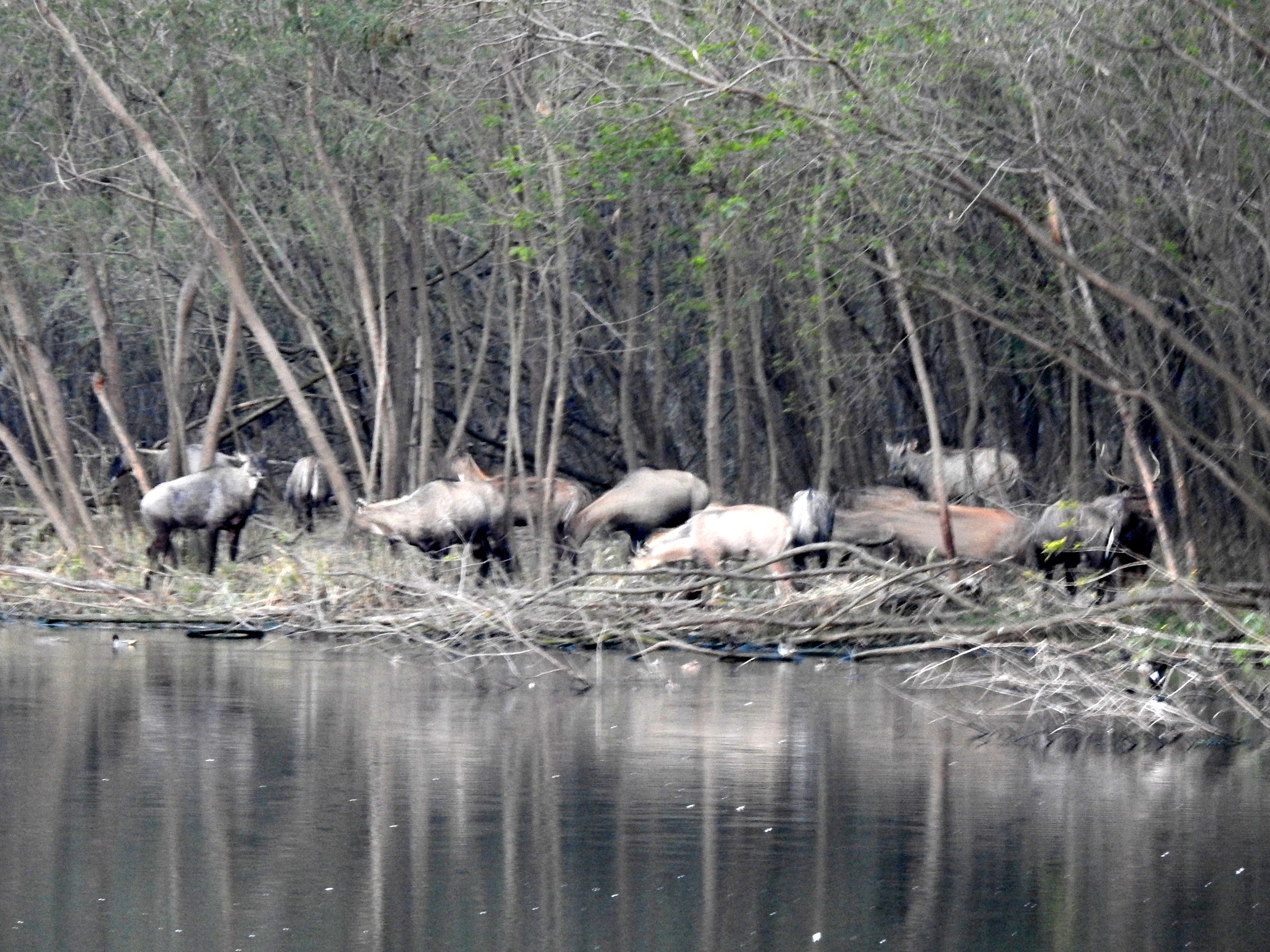
Nilgai, Dhanas lake, Chandigarh

==== Heritage Trees of Chandigarh ====
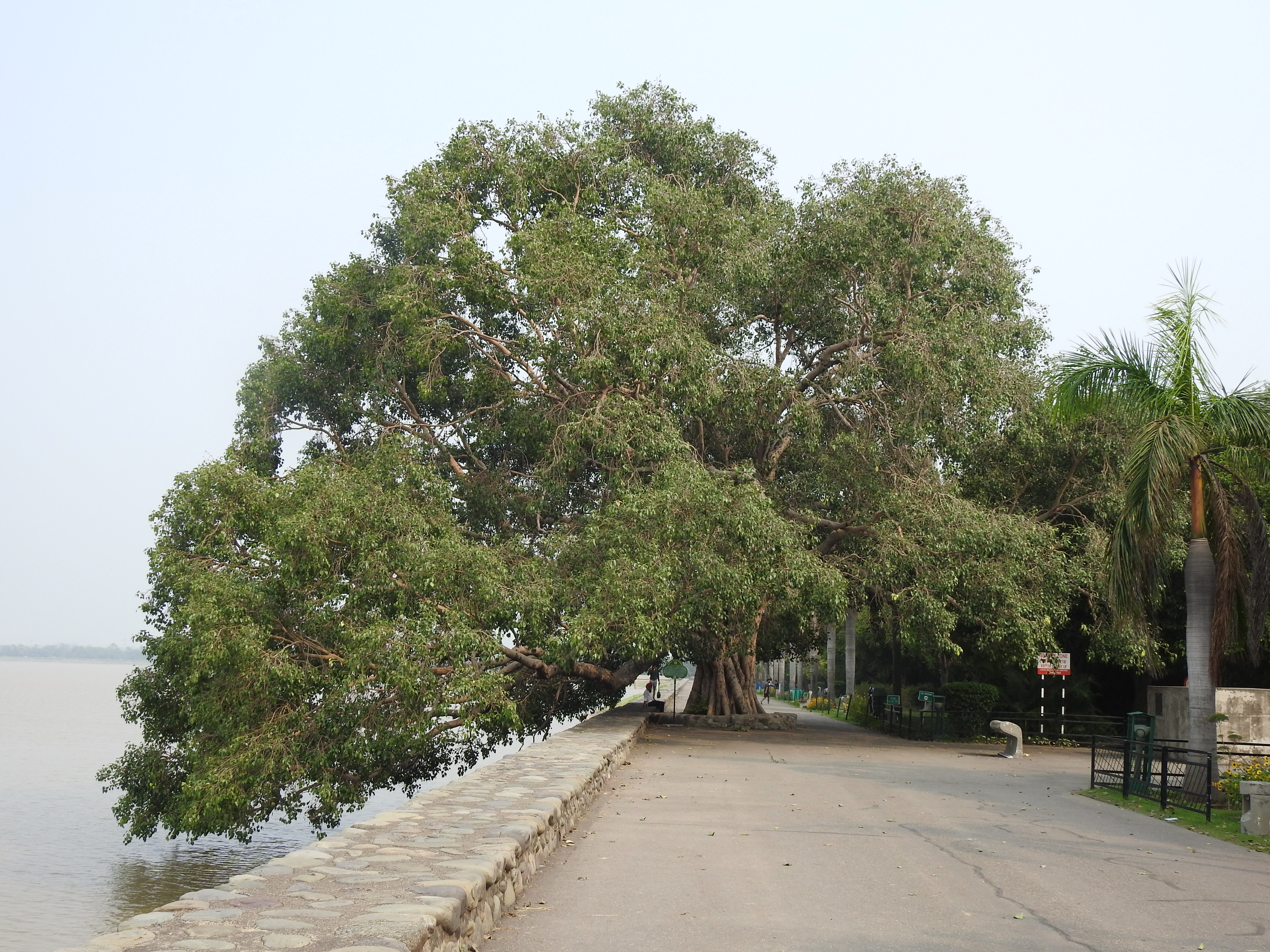
Peepal the Heritage Tree of Chandigarh at Sukhna Lake

Many trees in Chandigarh are given the status of the natural heritage of the city. The Chandigarh government has identified a list of 31 trees as Heritage Trees. The Department of Forest & Wildlife Chandigarh Administration is the nodal department for this purpose and has published a detailed booklet about it. The trees in the city that are a hundred or more years old have been given heritage status.

=== Landscape ===
Sukhna Lake, a 3 km^{2} artificial rain-fed lake in Sector 1, was created in 1958 by damming the Sukhna Choe, a seasonal stream coming down from the Shivalik Hills.

Chandigarh has a belt of parks running from sectors. It is known for its green belts and other special tourist parks. Sukhna Lake itself hosts the Garden of Silence. The Rock Garden, is located near the Sukhna Lake and has numerous sculptures made by using a variety of different discarded waste materials. The Zakir Hussain Rose Garden (which is also Asia's largest rose garden) contains nearly 825 varieties of roses in it and more than 32,500 varieties of other medicinal plants and trees. Other gardens include the Garden of Fragrance in Sector 36, Garden of Palms in Sector 42, Butterfly Park in Sector 26, Valley of Animals in Sector 49, the Japanese Garden in Sector 31 which is designed in traditional Japanese style and known for its peaceful atmosphere, the Terraced Garden in Sector 33, Shanti Kunj Garden, the Botanical garden and the Bougainvillea Garden. There is also the Government Museum and Art Gallery, Chandigarh in Sector 10.

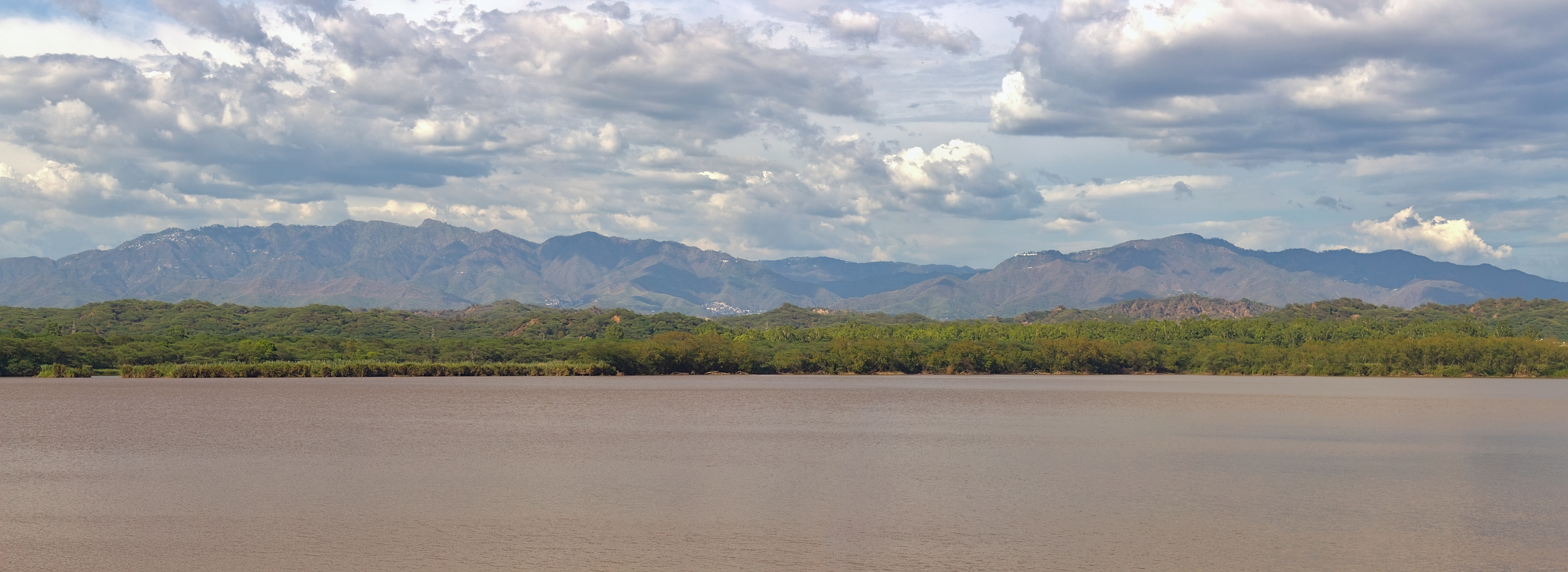
The outer Himalayan Shivalik hills as seen from the Sukhna Lake in Chandigarh.

== Demographics ==
Historical population
Year	Pop.	±% p.a.
1901	21,967	—
1911	18,437	−1.74%
1921	18,133	−0.17%
1931	19,783	+0.87%
1941	22,574	+1.33%
1951	24,261	+0.72%
1961	119,881	+17.32%
1971	257,251	+7.93%
1981	451,610	+5.79%
1991	642,015	+3.58%
2001	900,635	+3.44%
2011	1,055,450	+1.60%

=== Population ===
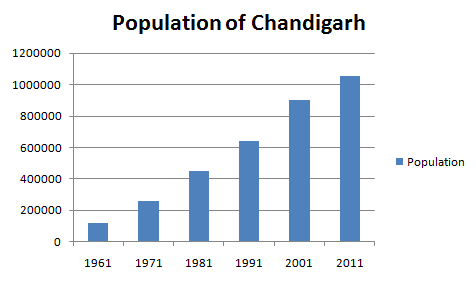
Population growth in Chandigarh over the years.

As of 2011 India census, Chandigarh had a population of 1,055,450, giving it a density of about 9,252 (7,900 in 2001) persons per square kilometre.

Males constitute 55% of the population and females 45%. The sex ratio is 818 females for every 1,000 males. The child-sex ratio is 880 females per thousand males. Chandigarh has an effective literacy rate of 86.77% (based on population 7 years and above), higher than the national average; with male literacy of 90.81% and female literacy of 81.88%. 10.8% of the population is under 6 years of age. The population of Chandigarh formed 0.09 per cent of India in 2011.

There has been a substantial decline in the population growth rate in Chandigarh, with just 17.10% growth between 2001 and 2011. Since the 1951–1961 period, the growth rate has decreased from 394.13% to 17.10%, a likely cause being the rapid urbanisation and development in neighbouring cities. The urban population constitutes 97.25% of the total and the rural population makes up 2.75%, as there are only a few villages within Chandigarh, situated on its Western and South-Eastern border, and the majority of people live in the heart of Chandigarh.

=== Languages ===
Languages of Chandigarh (2011)
1. Hindi (67.8%)
2. Punjabi (22.0%)
3. Bhojpuri (2.27%)
4. Haryanvi (1.06%)
5. Urdu (1.00%)
6. Pahari (0.93%)
7. Nepali (0.62%)
8. Bengali (0.59%)
9. Tamil (0.53%)
10. Telugu (0.41%)
11. Others (2.81%)

English and Hindi are the official languages used by the Chandigarh UT administration. The majority of the population speaks Hindi (67.76%) while Punjabi is spoken by 22.02%. Government schools use English, Hindi, and Punjabi textbooks. The percentage of Punjabi speakers has fallen from 36% in 1981 to 22% in 2011, while that of Hindi speakers has increased from 51% to 67%.

=== Religion ===
Religion in Chandigarh (2011)
Religion	Percent
Hinduism	80.71%
Sikhism	13.11%
Islam	4.87%
Christianity	0.83%
Others	0.40%

Hinduism is the predominant religion of Chandigarh followed by 80.71% of the population. Sikhism is the second most followed religion in the city, followed by 13.11% of the people, followed by Islam at 4.87%. Minorities are Christians at 0.83%, Jains at 0.19%, Buddhists at 0.11%, those that didn't state a religion at 0.10%, and others are 0.02%.

There are several places of worship located all over the city, with many in each sector, including the historic Mata Basanti Devi Mandir in Sector 24. The temple is dedicated to Goddess Shitala and specially visited by devotees during first Tuesday of Chaitra month after Holi. Chandi Mandir, Mata Mansa Devi Mandir and Mata Jayanti Devi Mandir are important Hindu temples located near Chandigarh. Saketri Shiv Mandir in Panchkula is another nearby historic temple dedicated to Lord Shiva. Nada Sahib Gurudwara, a famous place for Sikh worship lies in its vicinity. Apart from this, there are a couple of historical mosques in Manimajra and Burail. The Diocese of Simla and Chandigarh serves the Catholics of the city, with a co-cathedral in the city, which also governs most of the convent schools in Chandigarh.

== Health ==
The table below shows the data from the district nutrition profile of children below the age of 5 years, in Chandigarh, as of year 2020.

District nutrition profile of children under 5 years of age in Chandigarh, year 2020
Indicators	Number of children (<5 years)	Percent (2020)	Percent (2016)
Stunted	23,133	25%	29%
Wasted	7,690	8%	11%
Severely wasted	2,140	2%	4%
Underweight	18,799	21%	24%
Overweight/obesity	1,692	2%	1%
Anemia	44,830	55%	73%
Total children	91,436		

The table below shows the district nutrition profile of women in Chandigarh between the ages of 15 and 49 years, as of the year 2020.

District nutritional profile of women in Chandigarh aged 15–49 years, in 2020
Indicators	Number of women (15–49 years)	Percent (2020)	Percent (2016)
Underweight (BMI <18.5 kg/m^2)	57,268	13%	13%
Overweight/obesity	193,769	44%	41%
Hypertension	110,178	25%	12%
Diabetes	83,415	29%	NA
Anemia (non-preg)	264,506	60%	76%
Total women (preg)	37,116		
Total women	440,183		

== Government and politics ==
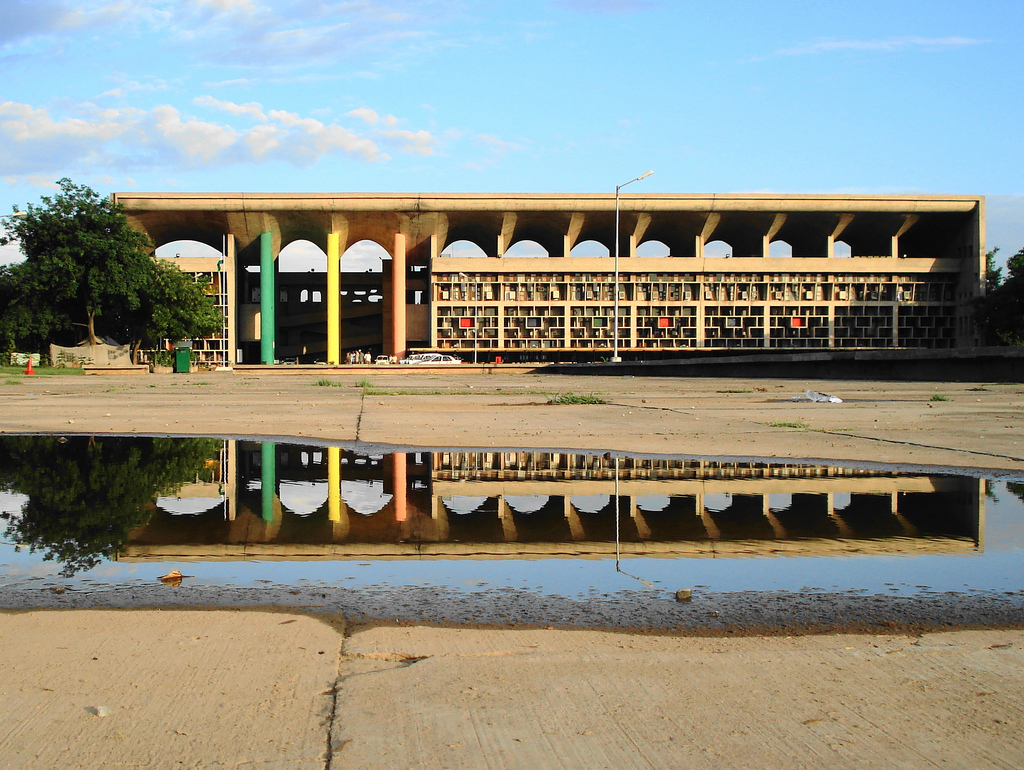
Punjab and Haryana High Court by Le Corbusier

=== Administrator of the union territory ===
Article 239 of the Constitution of India provides for the administration of the Union Territories by the President through an administrator. Since 1984 the Governor of Punjab has served concurrently as the administrator of Chandigarh. Gulab Chand Kataria has been the administrator of the union territory since 27 July 2024.

=== Politics ===
Chandigarh, as a union territory, is not entitled to a state-level election: thus State Assembly elections are not held and it is directly controlled by the central government. One seat for Chandigarh is allocated in the Lok Sabha elections held every five years.

Manish Tewari (INC) is the Member of Parliament elected in 2024 from the Chandigarh Lok Sabha constituency.

=== Civic administration ===
The city is governed by a civic administration or local government headed by Municipal Commissioner Amit Kumar and Mayor Harpreet Kaur Babla. The city comprises 35 wards represented by 35 elected councillors, and also nominates 9 councillors.

On 27 March 2022, Union Home Minister Amit Shah announced that the Chandigarh employees who were working under the Punjab service rules until 2022, would be working under the central civil services rules from 1 April 2022. The move was criticised by political parties such as the AAP, the INC and the Akali Dal.

Composition of Chandigarh Municipal Corporation after 2021 Chandigarh Municipal Corporation election as of December 2021:

Composition of Chandigarh Municipal Corporation (October 2025)
Party	Seats
Bharatiya Janata Party	18
Aam Aadmi Party	11
Indian National Congress	6
Nominated	9
Member of Parliament	1

=== Civic utilities ===
The prime responsibilities of the civic body Municipal Corporation Chandigarh, are to ensure cleanliness and sanitation in the city, illumination of street lights, maintenance of parks, and sewerage disposal. The city has both brick and pipe sewers laid in four phases. In September 2020, the civic body announced that it would upgrade and renew the 50-year-old sewerage system. The pilot project for the 24x7 water supply is expected to begin in Chandigarh in May 2021, which was initially to start in September 2020 and end in March 2022. On 8 April 2021, the Chandigarh Smart City Ltd (CSCL) board is yet to take the final decision.

In 2021, the BJP-ruled corporation had increased the water tariff by 1.5 to 2.5 times. This created a widespread discontent among the residents.

In 2021, there was an acute shortage of parking spaces. The problem was aggravated by an increase of 17% in parking rates by the Municipal Corporation. The increase in the waste collection charges, water tariff and property tax rates during the last five years 2016 to 2021 were unpopular among the public.

During the COVID-19 pandemic in India, concerns were raised about whether sufficient relief measures had been taken by the local government. The sitting Councillors were accused of not being found to be approachable when the public needed support.

==== Cleanliness ====
In 2025, the municipal corporation prepared a detailed agenda item to construct the city's first Integrated Municipal Solid Waste Processing Plant with a capacity of 550 tons per day (TPD) for 17 years, including two years of plant construction and 15 years of operation and maintenance. This will be a compressed biogas (CBG) plant to produce energy. This will be the city's first decentralised garbage processing facility in Sector 49. This facility is intended to serve four bulk waste generator housing societies, including Kendriya Vihar, Pushpak Enclave, Progressive Society, and Telehos Society, which collectively produce a daily output of 491 kg dry waste and 958 kg wet waste. So far, Chandigarh's first decentralised garbage processing unit has had mixed responses from RWAs and housing societies over potential concerns about smell and emissions.

In 2016, Chandigarh was the second cleanest city of India.

In 2021, Chandigarh fell 66 positions in the list of cleanest cities in India. The garbage piled up at the Dadu Majra garbage dump site. The city's cleanliness was once a point for the city, and its decline became an important poll issue.

== Economy ==
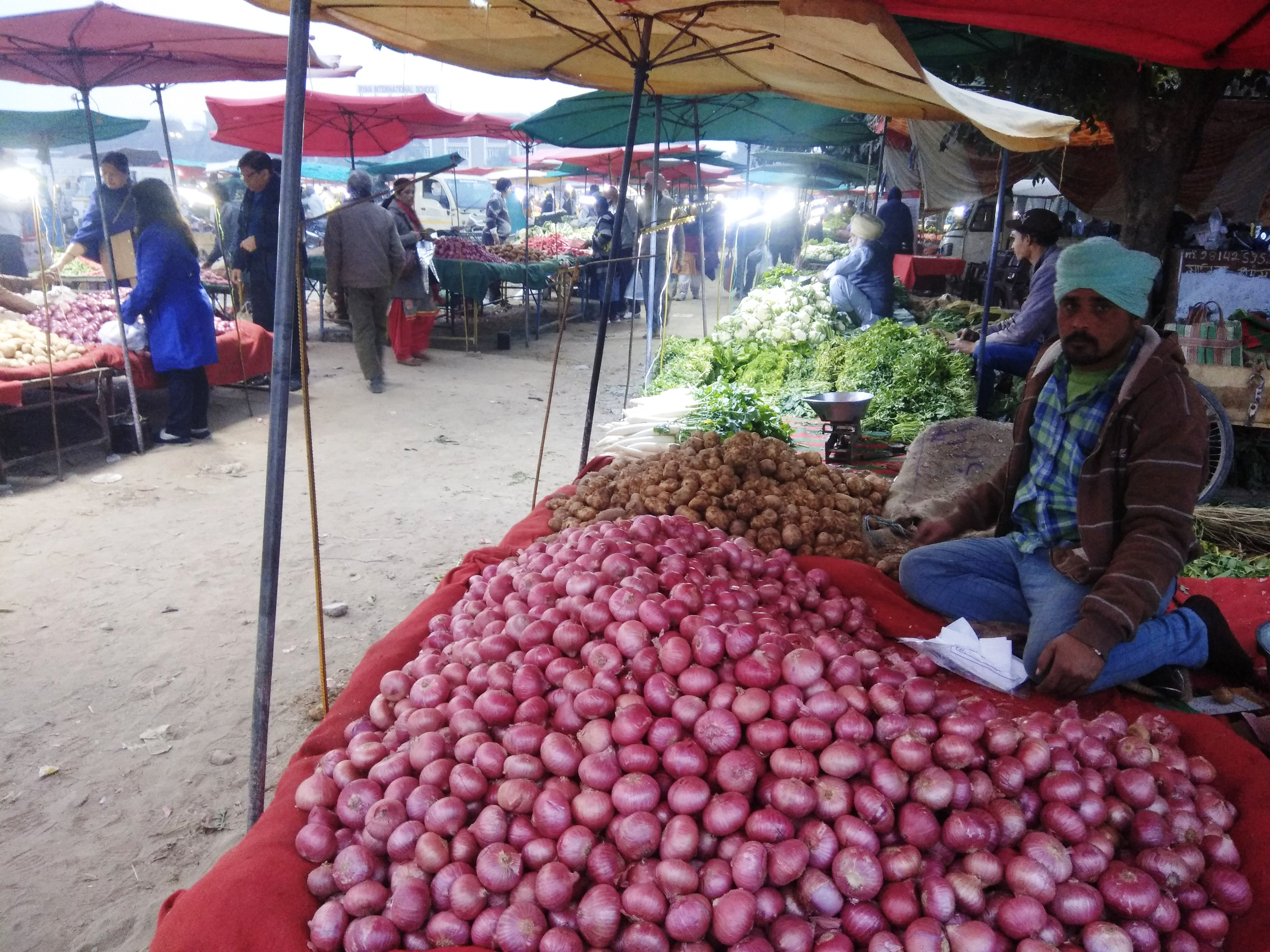
Farmers' Market in Chandigarh

Chandigarh has been rated as one of the "Wealthiest Towns" of India. The Reserve Bank of India ranked Chandigarh as the third-largest deposit centre and seventh-largest credit centre nationwide as of June 2012. With an average household monthly income of ₹199,000 (US$2,100), Chandigarh is one of the richest towns in India. Chandigarh's gross state domestic product for 2014–15 is estimated at ₹290 billion (equivalent to ₹480 billion or US$5.1 billion in 2026) at current prices. According to a 2014 survey, Chandigarh is ranked 4th in the top 50 cities identified globally as "emerging outsourcing and IT services destinations".

The Rajiv Gandhi Chandigarh Technology Park, also known as the Chandigarh IT Park, is a special economic zone which has facilities for information technology.

Technology Park, which has changed the economic scenario of the city and the vicinity by facilitating the growth of the economy, especially in the Services sector.

=== Employment ===
The government is a major employer in Chandigarh, with three governments having their base here, those being the Chandigarh Administration, the Punjab government, and the Haryana government. A significant percentage of Chandigarh's population, therefore, consists of people who are either working for one of these governments or have retired from government service, mainly armed forces. For this reason, Chandigarh is often called a "Pensioner's Paradise". Ordnance Cable Factory of the Ordnance Factories Board has been set up by the Government of India. There are about 15 medium-to-large industries, including two in the public sector. In addition, Chandigarh has over 2,500 units registered under the small-scale sector. The city's important industries are paper manufacturing, basic metals and alloys, and machinery. Other industries in the city are food products, sanitary ware, auto parts, machine tools, pharmaceuticals, and electrical appliances.

The main occupation here is trade and business. However, the Punjab and Haryana High Court, Post Graduate Institute of Medical Education and Research (PGIMER), the availability of an IT Park, and more than a hundred government schools provide other job opportunities to people.

Four major trade promotion organisations have their offices in Chandigarh. These are The Associated Chambers of Commerce & Industry, ASSOCHAM India, Federation of Indian Chambers of Commerce & Industry, (FICCI) the PhD Chamber of Commerce and Industry and the Confederation of Indian Industry (CII) having regional offices in Chandigarh.

Chandigarh IT Park (also known as Rajiv Gandhi Chandigarh Technology Park) is the city's attempt to break into the information technology world. Chandigarh's infrastructure, proximity to Delhi, Haryana, Punjab, and Himachal Pradesh, and the IT talent pool attract IT businesses looking for office space in the area. Major Indian firms and multinational corporations like Quark, Infosys, EVRY, TechMahindra, Airtel, Amadeus IT Group, DLF have set up base in the city and its suburbs.

The work of the Chandigarh Metro was slated to start by 2019. It was opposed by the Member of Parliament from Chandigarh, Kirron Kher. With an estimated cost of around ₹109 billion including 50% funds from the governments of Punjab and Haryana and 25% from Chandigarh and government of India, funds from the Japanese government were proposed to include approximately 56% of the cost. However, the project was turned down owing to its non-feasibility. Kher promised a film city for Chandigarh. After winning the seat, she said that she had difficulty in acquiring land in Chandigarh. Her proposal was accepted by the Chandigarh Administration and the film city is proposed to be set up in Sarangpur, Chandigarh. This has been considered as a source of employment in the future.

== Culture ==
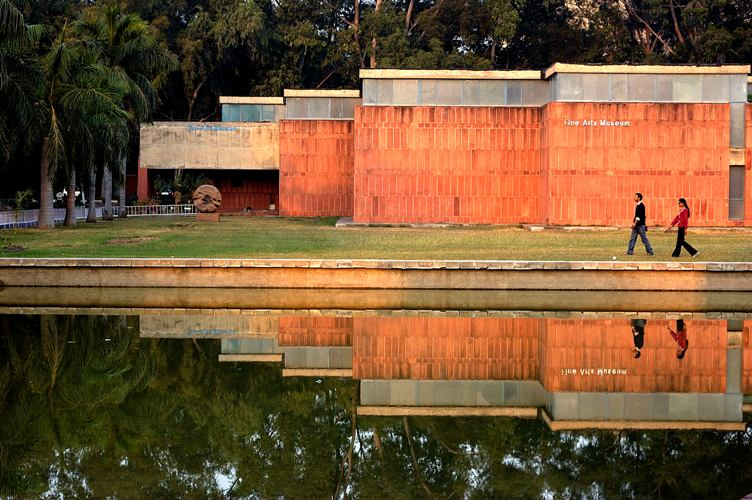
Fine Arts Museum, Panjab University

=== Festivals ===
Every year, in September or October during the festival of Navratri, many associations and organisations hold a Ramlila event, which has been conducted here for over 50 years.

The Rose Festival in Zakir Hussain Rose Garden every February shows thousands of subspecies of roses.

Chandigarh Carnival is an annual mega tourism event of Chandigarh Administration which is held in the last week of November every year.As a part of event, the department organises various fun and flora activities including setting up of amusement park, stalls, day cultural programmes etc.

The Mango Festival is held during the monsoons, and other festivals are held at Sukhna Lake.

Punjabi historic festivals like Lohri, Basant, Vaisakhi are also celebrated with great fervor and enthusiasm across the city.

== Transport ==
Unified Transport Metropolitan Authority, Chandigarh was made in 2023 to plan and execute the transportation needs of the Chandigarh Metropolitan Region.

=== Road ===
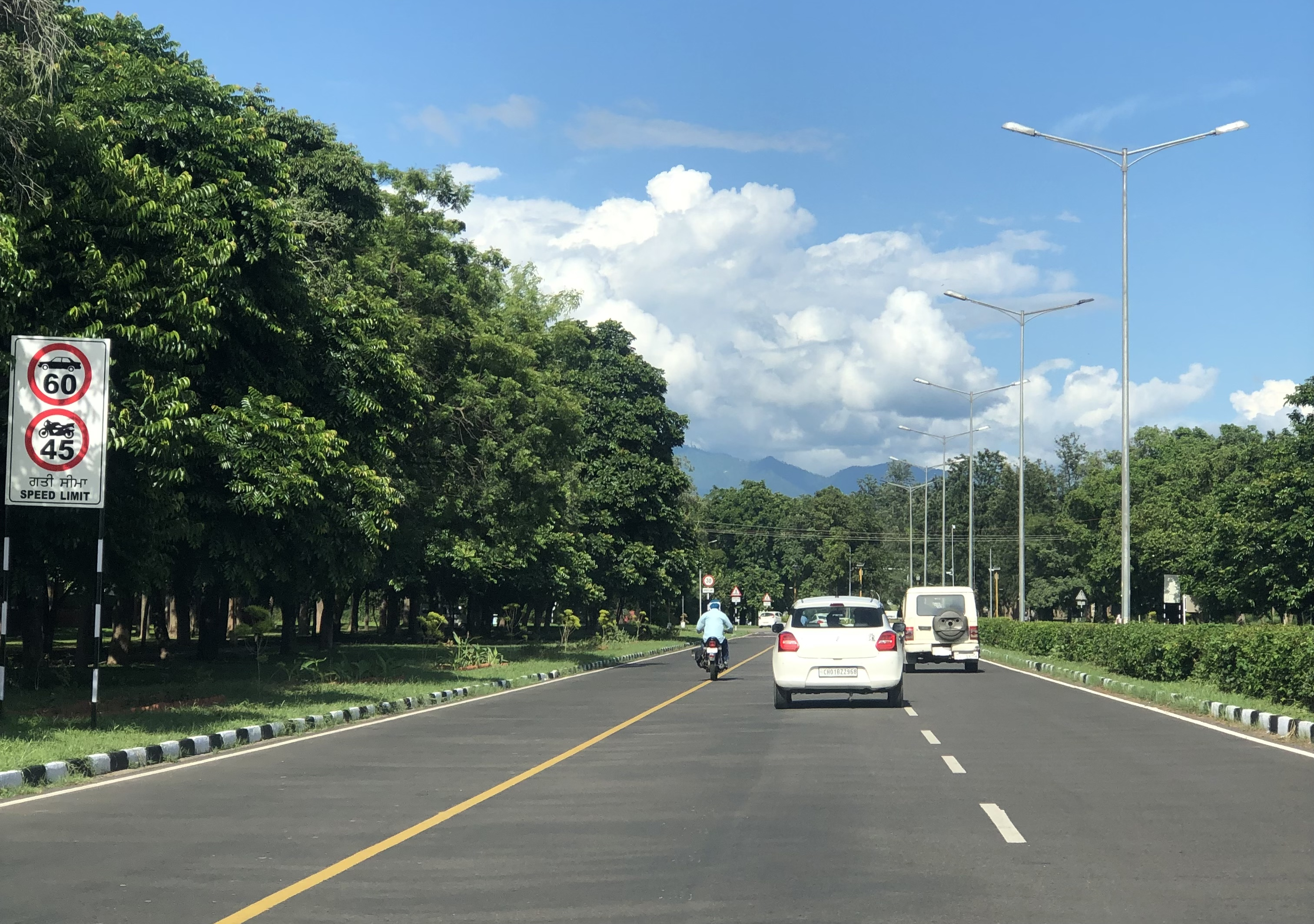
A road in Chandigarh

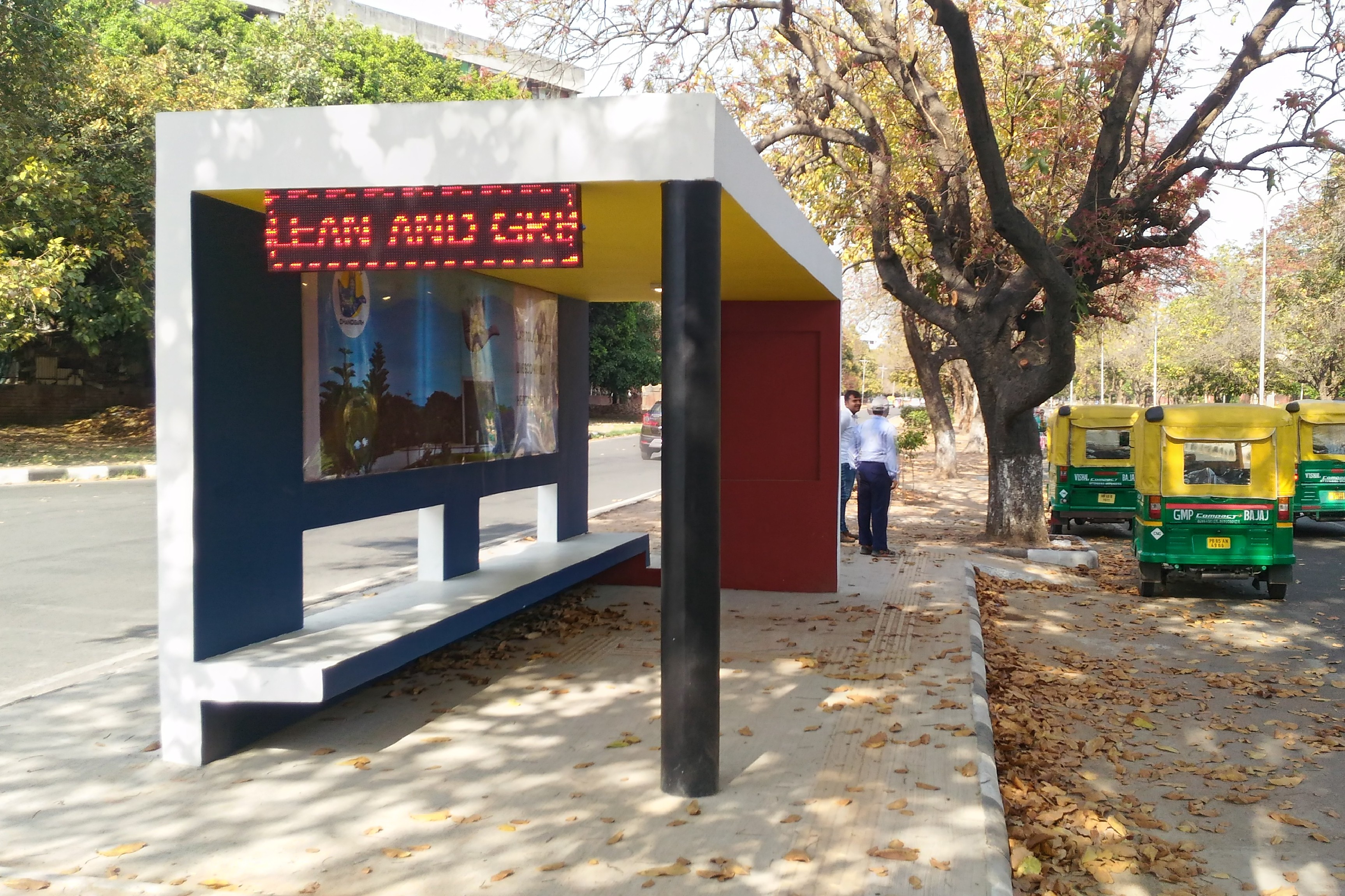
Bus queue shelter in Chandigarh

Chandigarh has a seven-tiered system of roads arranged in a grid plan to create separation of fast and slow motor traffic from pedestrians and cyclists. This system, named 'les Sept Voies' (lit. 'the Seven V's') by Corbusier, include the highway connecting the city to other cities, central axes (identified as Marg, मार्ग: Jan Marg, Madhya Marg, Dakshin Marg, Uttar Marg, Himalaya Marg, Purv Marg), arterial roads enveloping the sectors (identified as Path, पथ: Vidya Path, Udyan Path, Vigyan Path, Sarovar Path, Sukhna Path, Chandi Path, Udyog Path, Shanti Path), main shopping street bisecting each sector, circulation roads within the sector, residential streets, and cyclist and pedestrian paths.

Chandigarh has the largest number of vehicles per capita in India. Wide, well-maintained roads and parking spaces all over the city ease local transport. The Chandigarh Transport Undertaking (CTU) operates public transport buses from its Inter State Bus Terminals (ISBT) in Sectors 17 and 43 of the city. CTU also operates frequent bus services to the neighbouring states of Punjab, Haryana, Himachal Pradesh, and to Delhi.

Chandigarh is well-connected by road to the following nearby cities, by the following highway routes:

- NH 7 to Patiala in the southwest.
- NH 152 to Ambala and Kaithal in the south (NH 44 catches up from Ambala to Panipat-Delhi).
- NH 5 to Shimla in the northeast, and to Ludhiana in the west.

=== Air ===
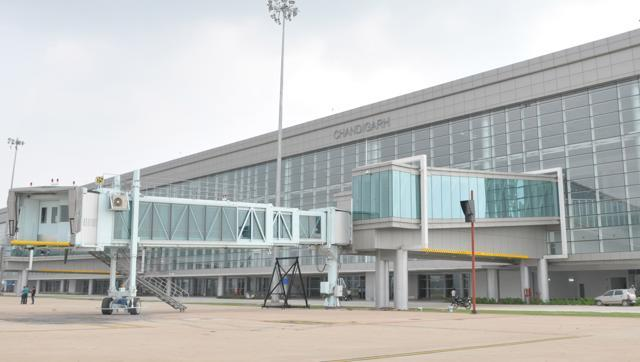
View of Chandigarh Airport new terminal

Chandigarh Airport has scheduled commercial flights to the major cities of India. An international terminal was completed in 2015, and international flight routes to Dubai and Sharjah were started. The runway is located in Chandigarh, while the terminal is in Mohali. The governments of Punjab and Haryana each have a 24.5% stake in the international terminal building, while the Airports Authority of India holds a 51% stake.

=== Rail ===
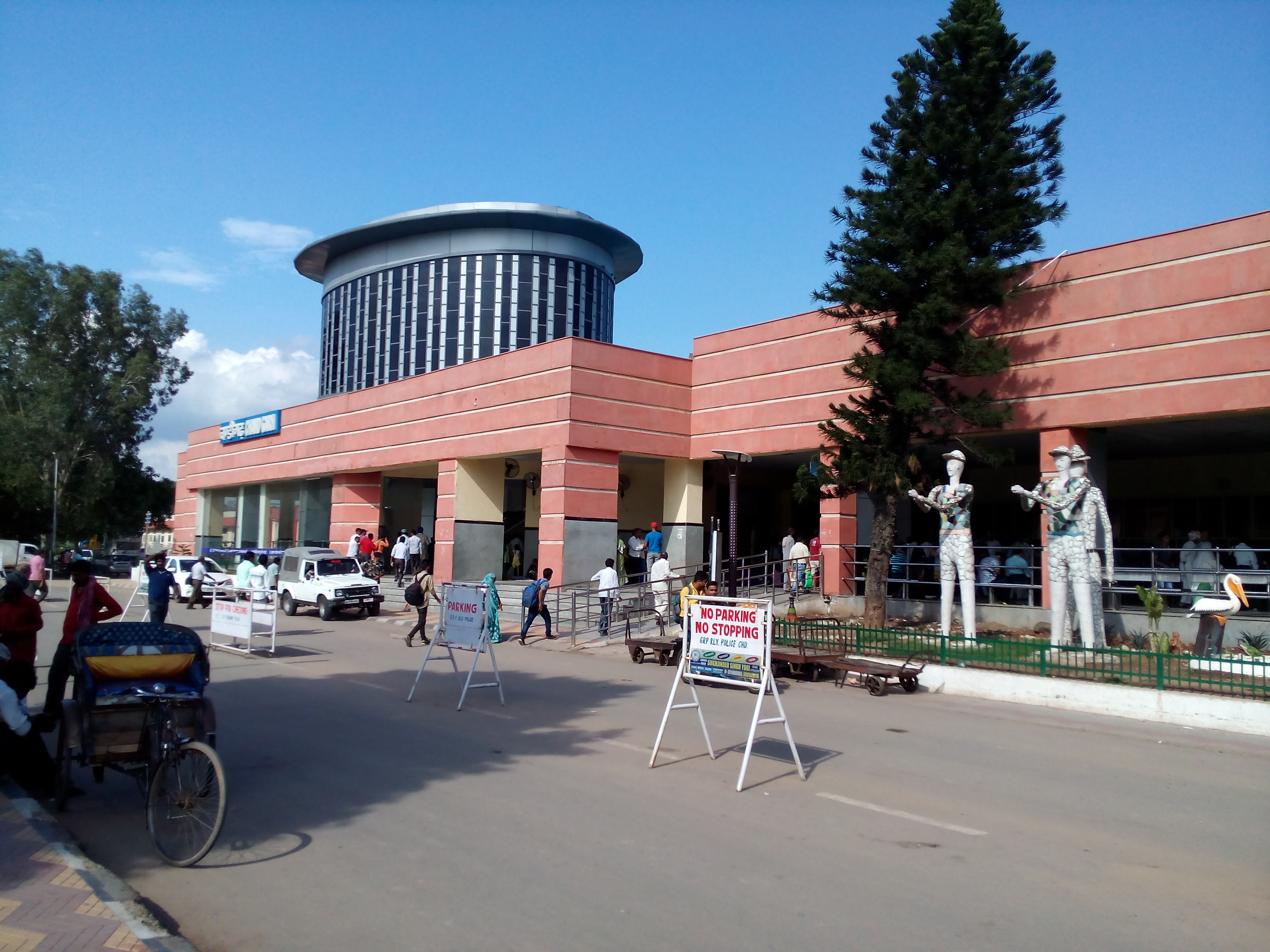
Chandigarh Junction

Chandigarh Junction railway station lies in the Northern Railway zone of the Indian Railways network and provides connectivity to most of the regions of India. The railway station also serves the neighbouring town of Panchkula. There were long-standing proposals to develop a metro rail system in the city, which were formally scrapped in 2017.

== Education ==
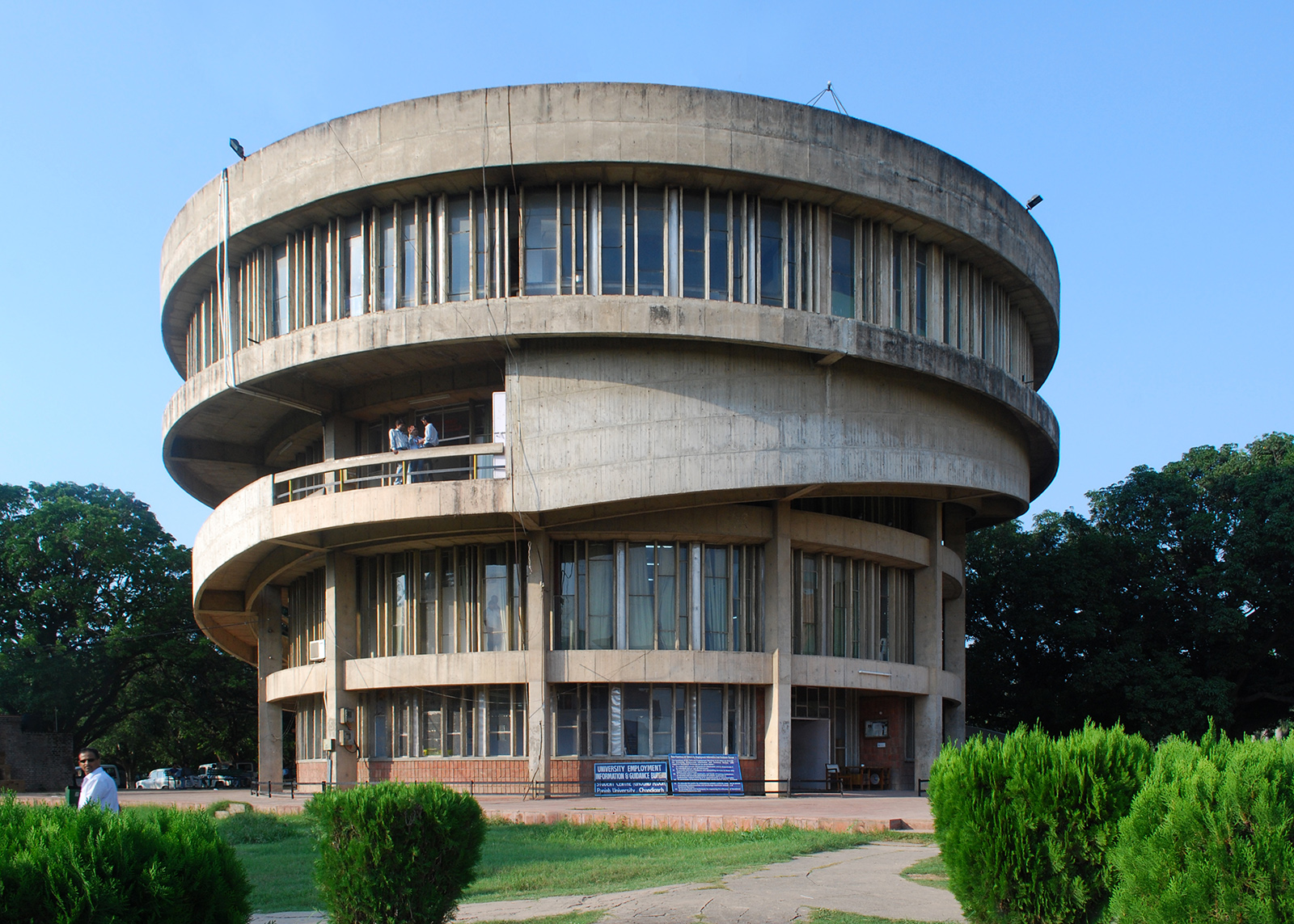
Student Centre, Panjab University

There are numerous educational institutions in Chandigarh. These range from privately and publicly operated schools to colleges. These include Panjab University, Post Graduate Institute of Medical Education and Research (PGIMER), Punjab Engineering College, Indian Institute of Science Education and Research, Indo-Swiss Training Centre of CSIR-CSIO, Post Graduate Government College, and DAV College.

According to the Chandigarh administration's department of education, there are a total of 115 government schools in Chandigarh, including Government Model Senior Secondary School, Sector 16, Jawahar Navodaya Vidyalaya, Bhavan Vidyalaya, convent schools like St. Anne's Convent School, St. John's High School, Chandigarh, Sacred Heart Senior Secondary School and Carmel Convent School, and other private schools like Delhi Public School and D.A.V. Public School.

Chandigarh has also emerged as a significant hub for IAS coaching centres in North India. With the ever-increasing popularity of civil services among the youth, the city has seen a proliferation of coaching institutes catering to UPSC aspirants. According to a survey conducted by O2 IAS Academy, many students from neighbouring states like Himachal Pradesh, Haryana, Punjab, and Union territory of Jammu and Kashmir prefer Chandigarh over Delhi for their IAS preparation due to its superior living conditions, access to educational resources, and quality teaching. Local Educational Institutes have contributed to the growing prominence of Chandigarh as a centre for civil services preparation.

== Sports ==
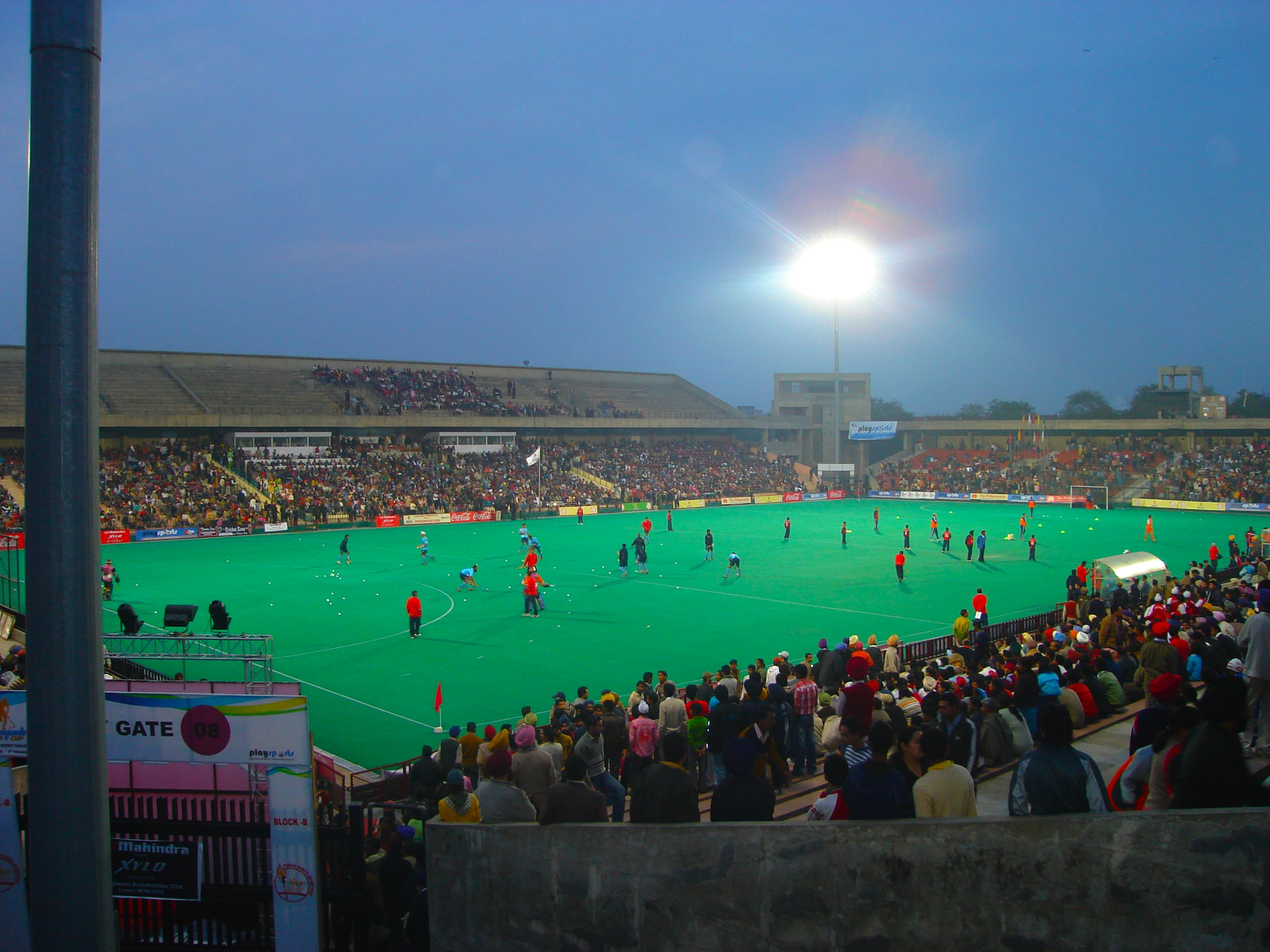
The Chandigarh Hockey Stadium, Sector 42

The Sector 16 Stadium has been a venue of several international cricket matches, but it has lost prominence after the PCA Stadium was constructed in Mohali. It still provides a platform for cricketers in this region to practise and play inter-state matches.

The Chandigarh Golf Club has a 7,202-yard, 18-hole course known for its challenging narrow fairways, dogleg 7th hole, and floodlighting on the first nine holes.

== Tourist attractions ==
The main tourist attractions in Chandigarh are:

=== Natural landscape ===
- Rock Garden of Chandigarh
- Chandigarh Bird Park
- Garden of Springs, Chandigarh
- Zakir Hussain Rose Garden
- Japanese Garden, Chandigarh
- Parrot Bird Sanctuary, Chandigarh
- Mahendra Chaudhary Zoological Park
- Sukhna Lake
- Sukhna Wildlife Sanctuary
- Rose Festival (Chandigarh)
- Heritage Trees of Chandigarh
- Sukhna Interpretation Centre
- Terraced Garden
- Leisure Valley, Chandigarh

=== Museums ===
- Government Museum and Art Gallery, Chandigarh
- Gandhi Bhawan, Chandigarh
- Open Hand Monument
- Indian Air Force Heritage Museum

=== Architecture ===
- Open Hand Monument
- Palace of Assembly, Chandigarh
- Chandigarh Capitol Complex
- Secretariat Building, Chandigarh

=== Others ===
- Sector-17, Chandigarh
- Burail Fort
- Manimajra Fort
- Chandi Mandir
- Elante Mall
- Paras Downtown Square
- Tagore Theatre
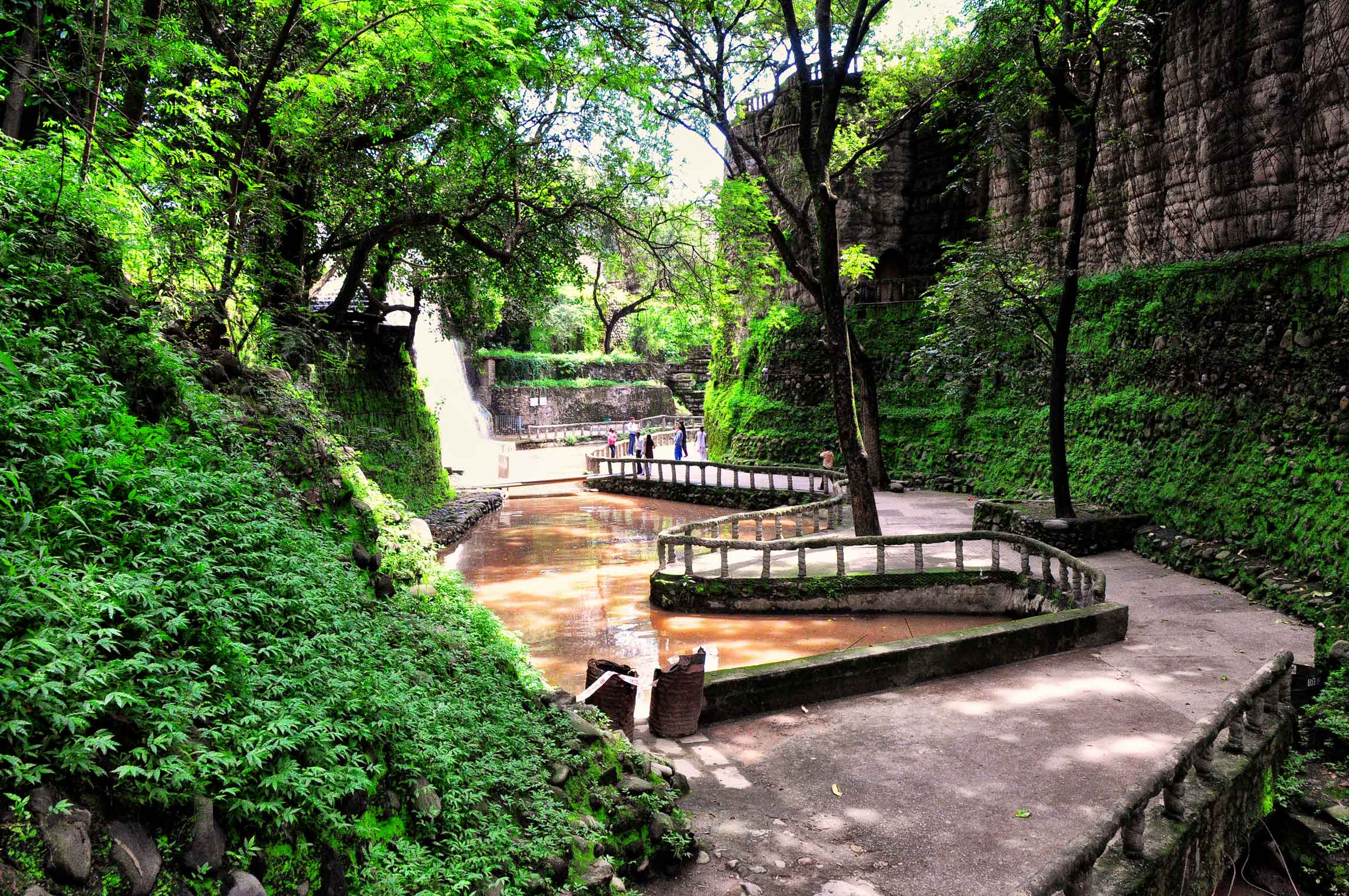
Rock Garden

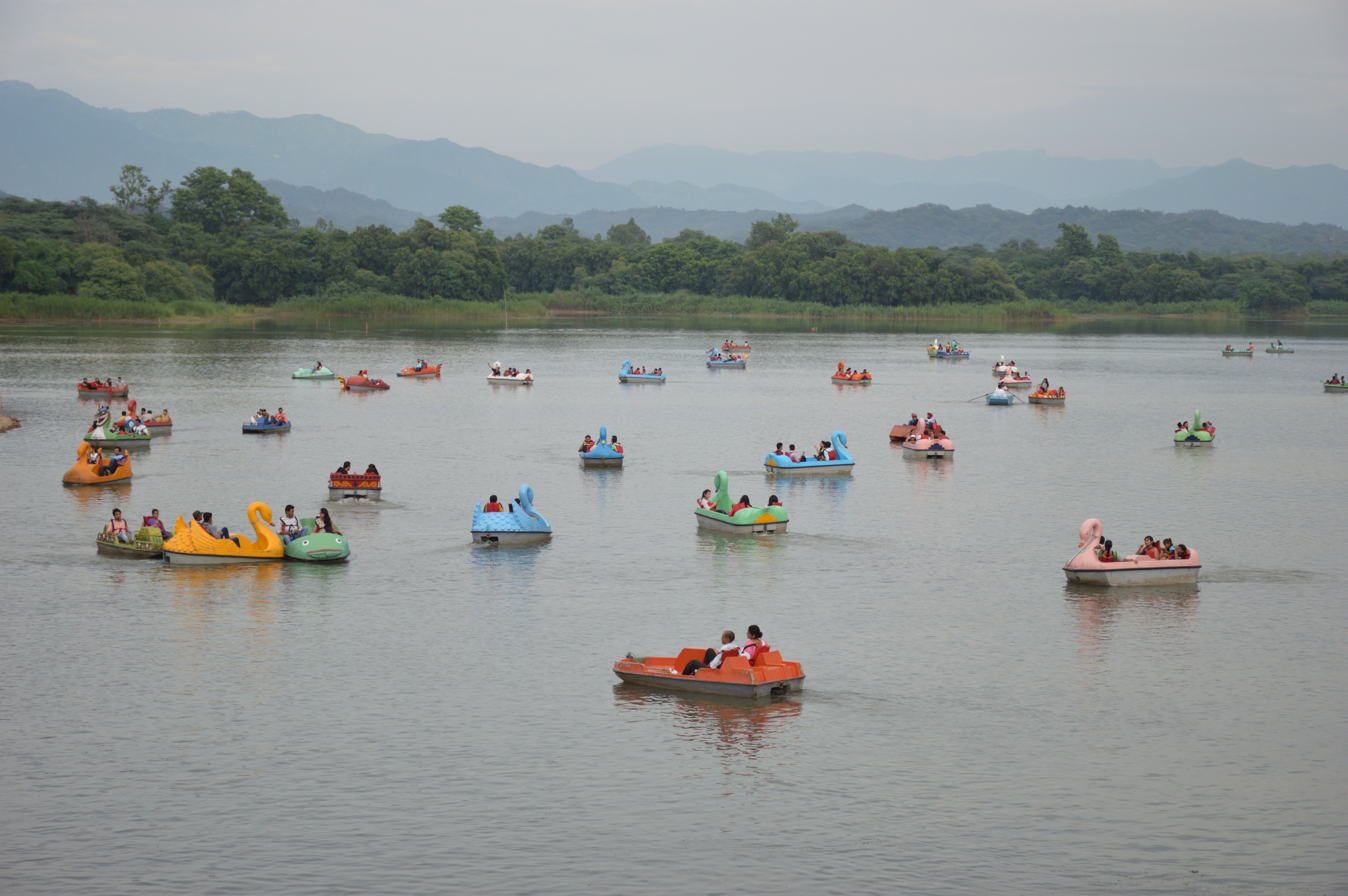
Sukhna Lake

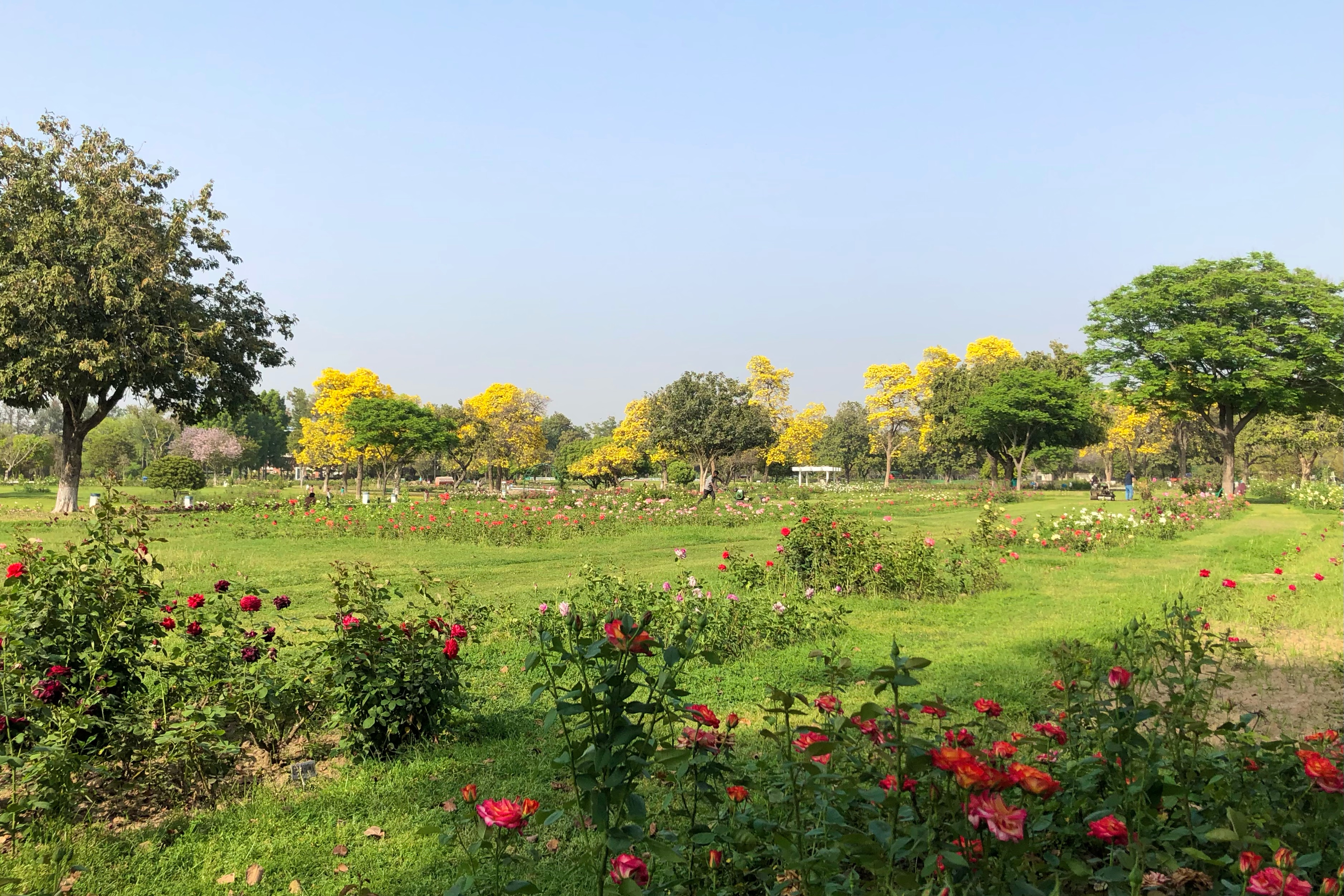
Rose Garden

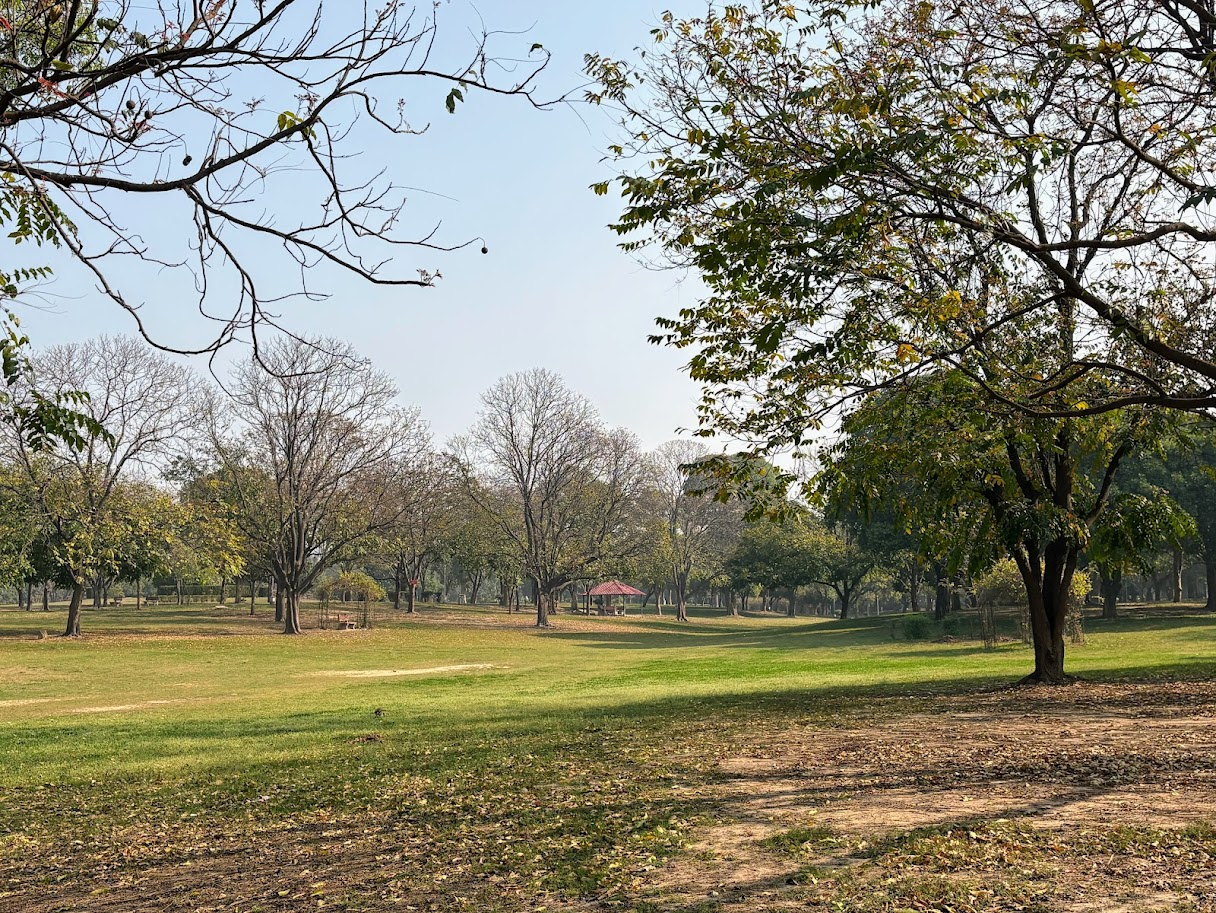
Leisure Valley

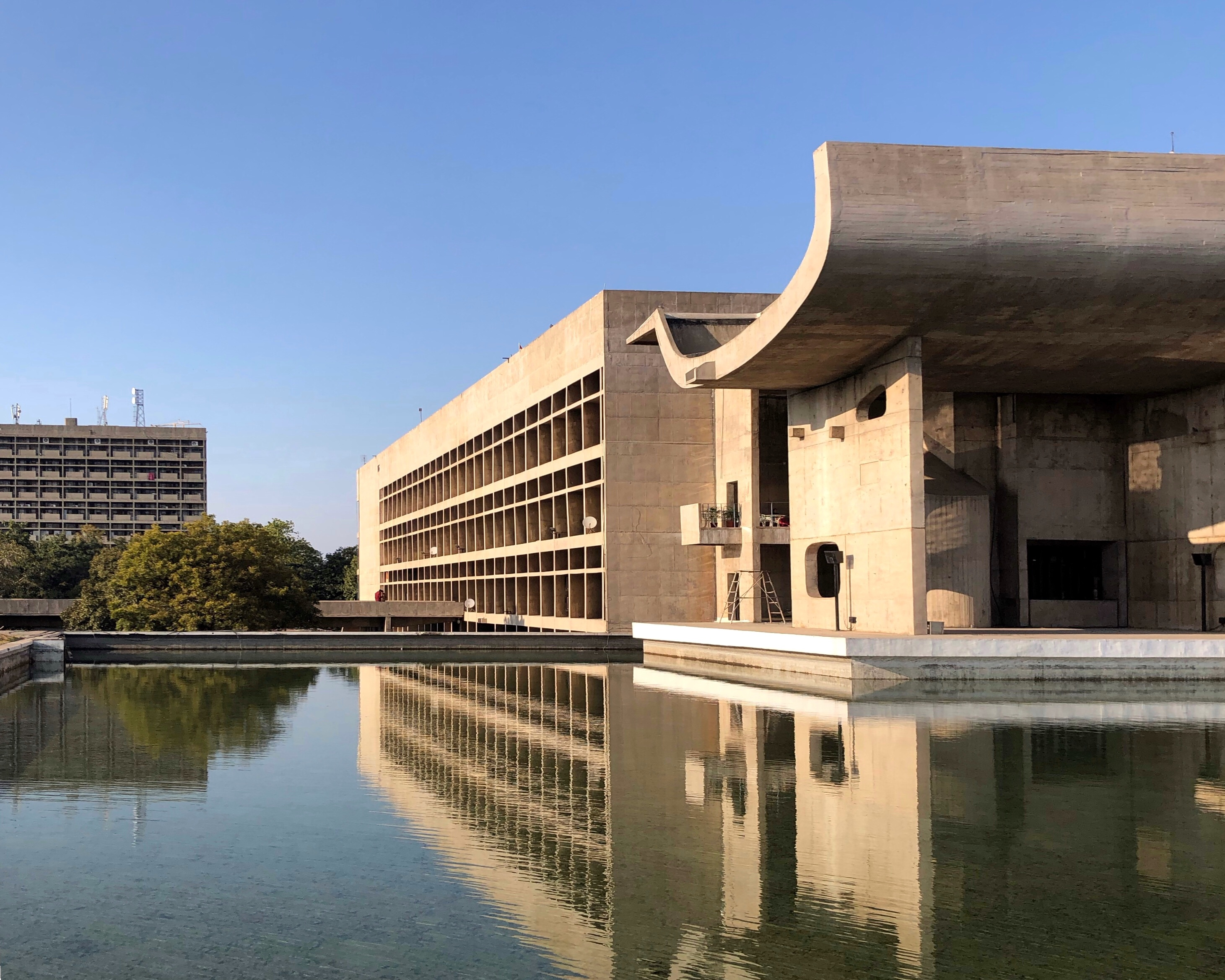
Palace of Assembly, Capitol Complex

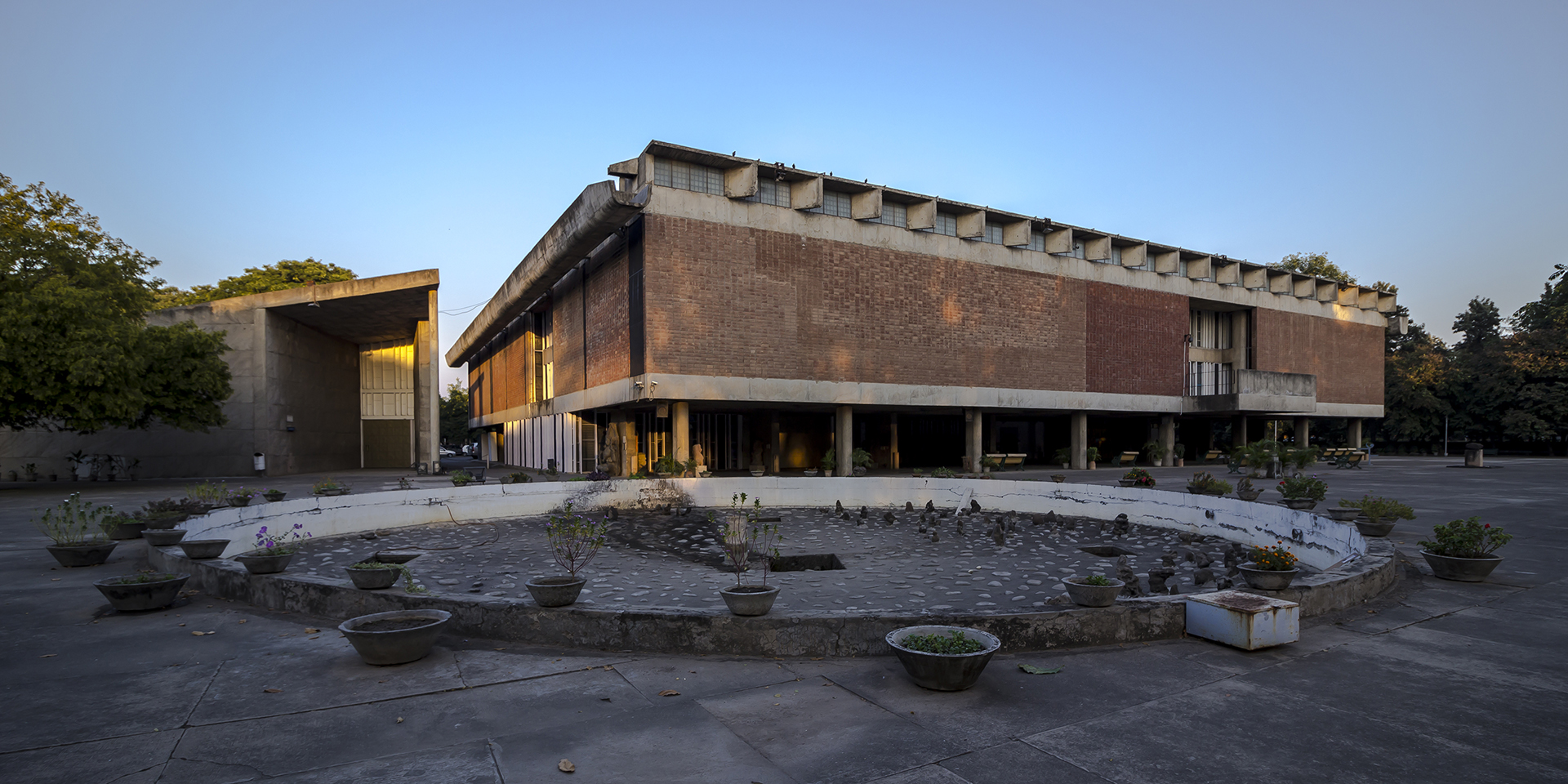
Government Museum and Art Gallery

== Postcolonial significance ==
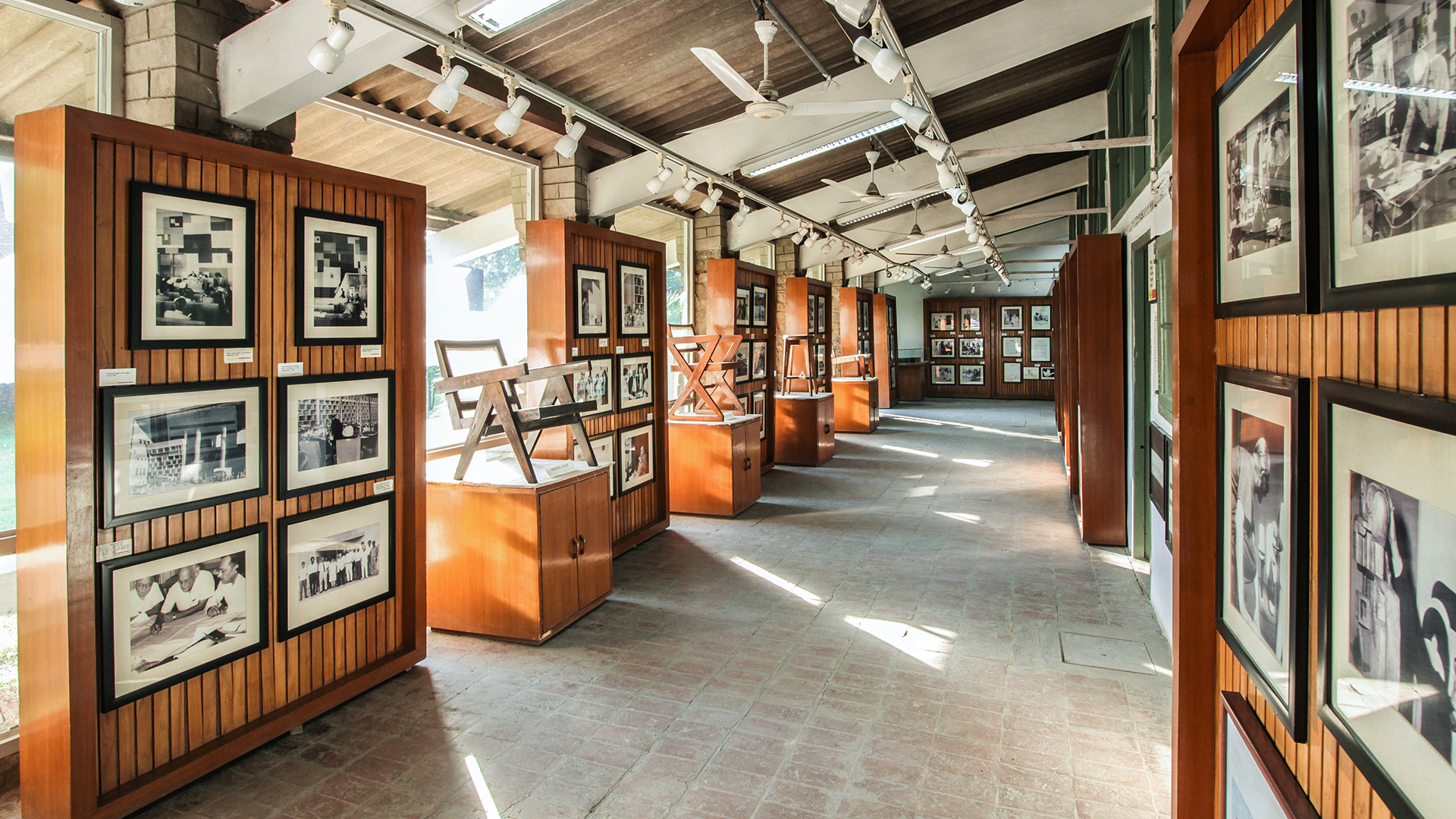
Le Corbusier Centre, Chandigarh

=== Background ===
For Nehru, Chandigarh represented a vision of how a new planned city could be a canvas for the regeneration of the nation itself after centuries of British colonial rule and the dilution of Indian character from the nation's towns. Guided by the architectural optics of Le Corbusier, the development of Chandigarh was part of a state-driven exercise to break from the traditions of imperialism in urban planning and begin the process of healing from the injustices suffered.

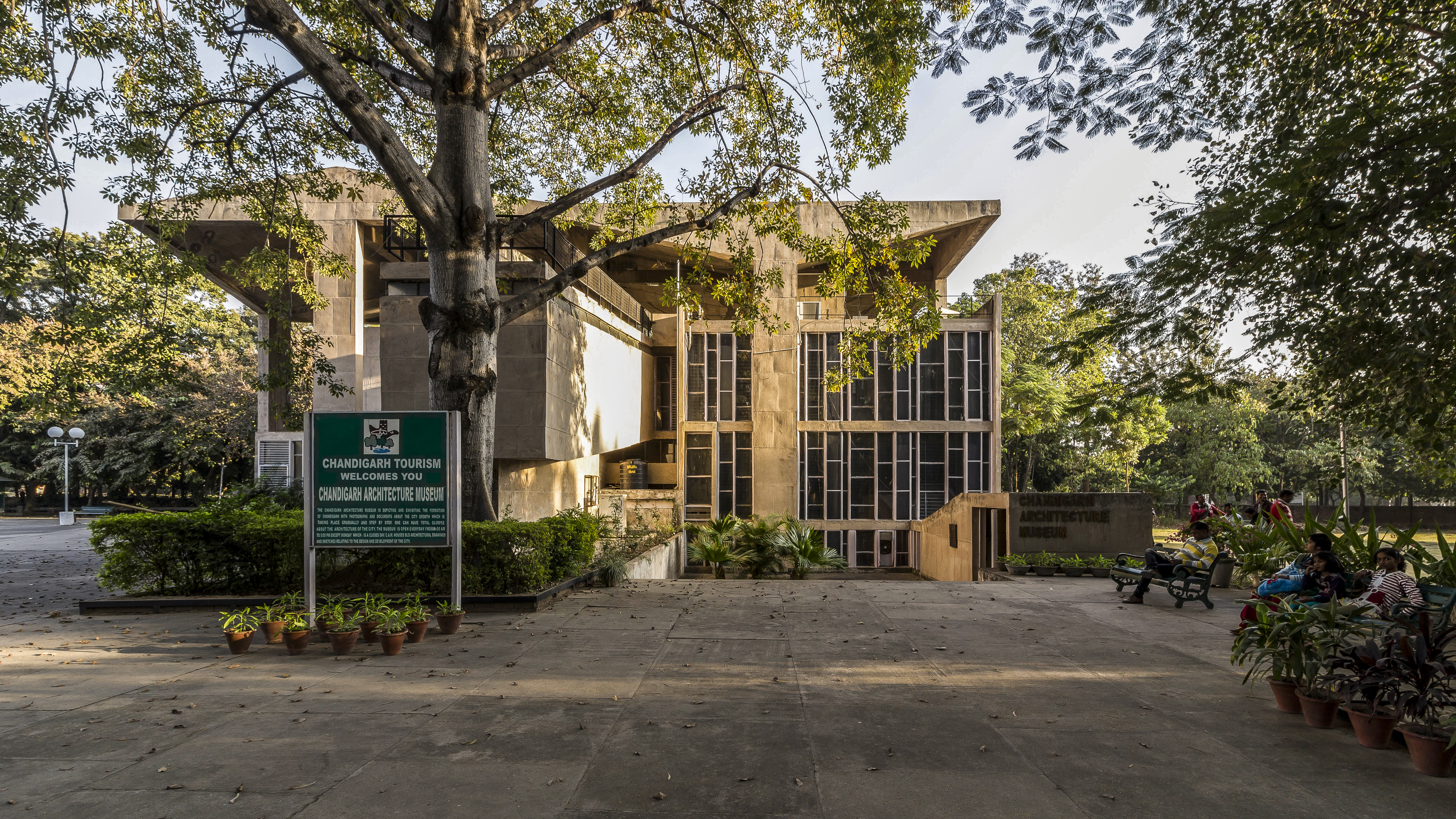
Architecture Museum in Sector 10, Chandigarh chronicles the architectural development of Chandigarh

=== Modernism in new town design ===
Off the back of this conflation of assets Chandigarh then was well poised to serve a function as a city-building project in national identity. From a federal policy perspective, the development of the new town became a tool in India for modernisation and an intended driver of economic activity, legal reform, and regional growth as well as a significant agent for the decolonisation project. After India's independence in 1947, policymakers for the new Indian government were required to contend with issues such as rapid rural depopulation, urban congestion, and poverty. As well as in Chandigarh this policy tool was implemented in the creation of new capital cities in Bhubaneswar and Gandhinagar, and more broadly throughout India in the 112 planned cities created between independence and 1971, purposed to absorb migration from those regions and provide hubs for growing industries such as in steel and energy.

These examples from a genealogy of utopian urban forms developed in post-independence India as a panacea for issues related to underdevelopment as well as post-independence complications to do with separatist religious conflict and the resulting diplomatic tensions. Chandigarh is the first example of a state-funded master-planned modernisation scheme. These "urban utopias" attempt to enforce nation-building policies through a federalised rule of law at a regional level, and diffuse postcolonial urbanism which codes justice in its design. The intent is that the economic success and progressivism of cities such as Chandigarh as a lightning rod for social change would gradually be emulated at the scale of the nation. Chandigarh was for Nehru and Le Corbusier an embodiment of the egalitarian potential offered by modernism, where the machine age would complete the liberation of the nation's citizens through the productive capacity of industrial technology and the relative ease of constructing civic facilities such as dams, hospitals, and schools; the very antithesis of the conservative and traditional legacy of colonialism. Though built as a state capital Chandigarh came to be focused on industry and higher education. The specialisation of these new towns in particular functions represents a crucial aspect of the modernisation process as a decolonising enterprise, in completing a national portfolio where each town forms a part of the utopian model for contemporary India.

The post-colonialism of Chandigarh is rooted in the transformation of the political ideas of those such as Nehru who generated a new Indian nationalism through the design of newly built forms. Scholars such as Edward Said have emphasised the sinister nature of nostalgia and the romanticisation of colonial architecture in newly independent colonies as artefacts that perpetuate the ideological legacy of the hegemony and replicate the hierarchy of power even after decolonisation. Insofar as modernism in architecture (which defined town planning under the Nehru era of rule) represents an active radical break from tradition and a colonial past even the very presence of Le Corbusier has been recognised as a form of resistance to the legacy of British influence in Indian architecture, as he provided the first non-British influence on design thinking in India, enabling a generational shift in the contemporary cohort of architects and planners to be hired by the state throughout the rest of the century who were initiated under Modernist conditioning.

As early as the 1950s the presence of the International Style could be detected in the design of houses in India, "whether mistri or architect-designed". The development of low-cost housing was a priority for Chandigarh, and the modern forms designed by Corbusier are characterised by a dispensing with colonial forms focused on classic aesthetics and a refocusing on strategies such as using narrow frontages and orientation for minimising direct exposure to the sun and maximising natural ventilation and efficient cost while providing modern amenities in the International Style aesthetic. These developments are credited as the beginning of a "Chandigarh architecture", inspiring gradual experimentation with form and an "Indianising" of the International Style which precipitated the formation of the country's new cultural identity in town design.

In 2024, Tropical Modernism: Architecture and Independence, an exhibition at the Victoria and Albert Museum, London, featured designs for Chandigarh.

=== Criticisms ===
Criticisms are well established regarding the implementation of the postcolonial vision of Nehru and Le Corbusier and the critical emphasis on its influence. Claims have been made that the focus on Corbusier's architect-centred discourse erases the plural authorship of the narrative of Chandigarh's development, arguing that it was, in fact, a hybridity of values and of "contested modernities" of Western and indigenous Indian origin and cultural exchanges rather than an uncontested administrative enterprise. Such criticism is consistent with claims that decolonisation in India has marked a shift from segregation based on race to segregation based on class and that planned cities are truly "designed" ones which represent the values and interests of a westernised middle-class Indian elite which ignore the complexities of India's diverse ethnic and cultural landscape and enabled neocolonial hierarchies such as the imposition of the Hindi language on non-conforming castes.

Brent C. Brolin argues that Le Corbusier ignored Indian preferences in designing the housing and communities and that the residents have done what they can to recreate their accustomed lifestyle. Furthermore, the early over-saturation of the minimalist International Style in building design in Chandigarh has attracted criticisms of effecting a "democratic, self-effacing banality", though this criticism is perhaps negligent of how this was necessary for galvanising higher standards of urban living throughout the country.

== Notable people ==
- Peepal Baba, environmentalist
- Sarbjit Bahga, architect, author, photo-artist
- Binny Bansal, founder of Flipkart, billionaire
- Sachin Bansal, founder of Flipkart, billionaire
- Neerja Bhanot, youngest Ashoka Chakra Awardee, flight attendant and model
- Sabeer Bhatia, Indian-American entrepreneur who founded Hotmail
- Jaspal Bhatti, Padma Bhushan awardee, film and TV actor and renowned satirist
- Abhinav Bindra, Olympic gold medalist
- Nek Chand, Indian artist and creator of the Rock Garden of Chandigarh
- Surveen Chawla, Punjabi film actress
- Gurleen Chopra, Punjabi actress
- Vivek Dahiya, actor
- Harita Kaur Deol, pilot
- Kapil Dev, former Indian international cricketer
- Ishaan Dhawan, TV actor
- Shagun Pandey, TV actor
- Harmeet Dhillon, American lawyer
- Mukesh Gautam, Punjabi film director
- Yami Gautam, Indian film actress
- Mahie Gill, Indian actress
- Sandesh Jhingan, Indian international professional footballer
- Mamta Joshi, Sufi singer
- Gurbani Judge, MTV India VJ and actress
- AJ Kanwar, award-winning dermatologist, former professor and head, PGI, Chandigarh
- Kamla K. Kapur, Indian-American writer, poet, playwright
- Kirron Kher, Indian actress and theatre artist (also BJP M.P. from the city)
- Aparshakti Khurana, Indian film actor
- Ayushmann Khurrana, Indian film actor
- Rochak Kohli, music composer, singer, lyricist
- Kewal Krishan (born 1973), forensic anthropologist
- Sargun Mehta, Punjabi film actress
- Anjum Moudgil, Indian rifle shooter
- Prince Narula, actor
- Ramesh Kumar Nibhoria, winner of Ashden Awards-UK
- Gul Panag, Indian film actress and social activist
- Neel Kamal Puri novelist, columnist
- Gajendra Pal Singh Raghava, bioinformatics scientist
- Kulraj Randhawa, Punjabi film actress
- Mohinder Singh Randhawa, civil servant who had a major role in establishing Chandigarh
- Harnaaz Sandhu, winner of Miss Universe 2021
- Mohit Sehgal, TV actor
- Piare Lal Sharma, writer
- Jeev Milkha Singh, professional golfer
- Milkha Singh Commonwealth gold medalist
- Yuvraj Singh, Indian international cricketer
- Pammi Somal, Bollywood journalist and filmmaker
- Sri Srinivasan, United States Circuit Judge of the United States Court of Appeals for the District of Columbia Circuit
- Manan Vohra, cricketer
- Hitendra Wadhwa, professor at Columbia Business School
- Kashmiri Lal Zakir, Indian poet, novelist, dramatist and short story writer

== Villages ==
- Khuda Jassu

== See also ==
- Ambala–Chandigarh Expressway
- Emblem of Chandigarh
- Kaimbwala
- Navyug Ramlila and Dussehra Committee
- New Chandigarh, Punjab
