= Deputy Commissioner's Office, Chandigarh =

District administration office headed by the Deputy Commissioner of Chandigarh

Deputy Commissioner’s Office, Chandigarh
- उपायुक्त कार्यालय, चंडीगढ़
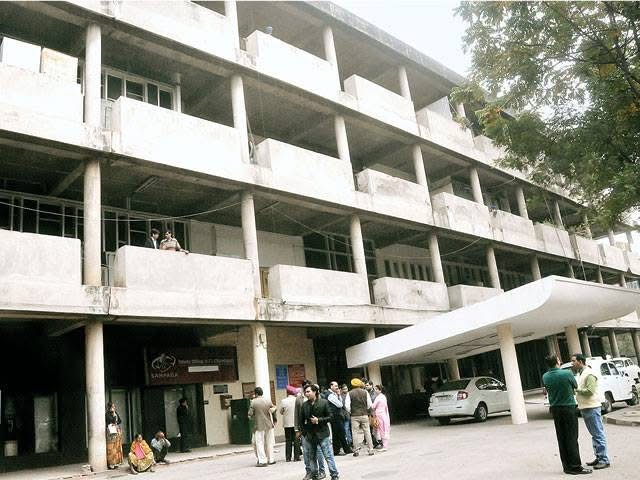
- DC Office & Estate Office, Chandigarh

District administration office overview
- Jurisdiction: Chandigarh (Union Territory), India
- Headquarters: Deputy Commissioner Office, Sector 17, Chandigarh (UT) – 160017
- District administration office executive: Nishant Kumar Yadav, IAS (Deputy Commissioner)
- Parent District administration office: Chandigarh Administration
- Website: https://chandigarhdistrict.nic.in/

The Deputy Commissioner’s Office, Chandigarh (often called the DC Office Chandigarh) is the district administration office for the Union Territory of Chandigarh. Headed by the Deputy Commissioner (DC), the office coordinates district-level administration and public service delivery, including grievance handling and inter-departmental enforcement actions in coordination with the Chandigarh Administration.

== Location ==
The DC Office is located in Sector 17, Chandigarh (UT) – 160017.

== Role and functions ==
The Deputy Commissioner’s Office acts as the nodal district administration unit and, as reported in local press, has run public hearing and grievance-resolution initiatives to strengthen citizen interface mechanisms. The Deputy Commissioner also holds concurrent charge of several district-level posts, including District Election Officer and Excise Commissioner, and in that capacity issues orders and public notices on matters ranging from electoral roll revision to excise policy compliance.

== Notable initiatives and actions ==
=== Citizen grievance and public hearing drive ===
In November 2025, The Tribune reported that the DC Office institutionalised a citizen interface through a Citizen Interaction and Assistance branch and that hundreds of complaints had been resolved under a public hearing drive.

=== Encroachment and removal orders ===
In May 2025, The Times of India reported that the Deputy Commissioner ordered removal action concerning unauthorised religious structures on government land, citing compliance with court directions and department-wise action taken reporting.

=== Building safety and structural audits ===
In October 2025, The Tribune reported that the Chandigarh Administration ordered structural audits of old/dilapidated buildings and that an expert committee was set up under the Deputy Commissioner’s direction.

=== Proposed Integrated Deputy Commissioner Office Complex ===
In January 2026, The Tribune reported that the Chandigarh Administration sought Ministry of Home Affairs approval for an “Integrated Deputy Commissioner Office Complex” in Sector 17, with an estimated cost reported at around Rs 160 crore.

=== Clarification on fuel supply rumours ===
In May 2026, PTC News reported that the Deputy Commissioner clarified that no order had been issued restricting retail sale of petrol or diesel in Chandigarh, following rumours of fuel rationing at city pumps, and stated that fuel stocks were adequate and supply was normal.

=== Special Intensive Revision of electoral rolls ===
In May 2026, the Deputy Commissioner, in his capacity as District Election Officer, addressed a press conference on the Special Intensive Revision of the Photo Electoral Roll ahead of the 1 July 2026 qualifying date, as directed by the Election Commission of India, with the draft electoral roll scheduled for publication on 21 July 2026.

== See also ==
- Chandigarh Administration
- Chandigarh
- Deputy commissioner (India)
