= Parrot Bird Sanctuary, Chandigarh =

Bird sanctuary in Chandigarh, India

City Bird Sanctuary Chandigarh
- IUCN category IV (habitat/species management area)
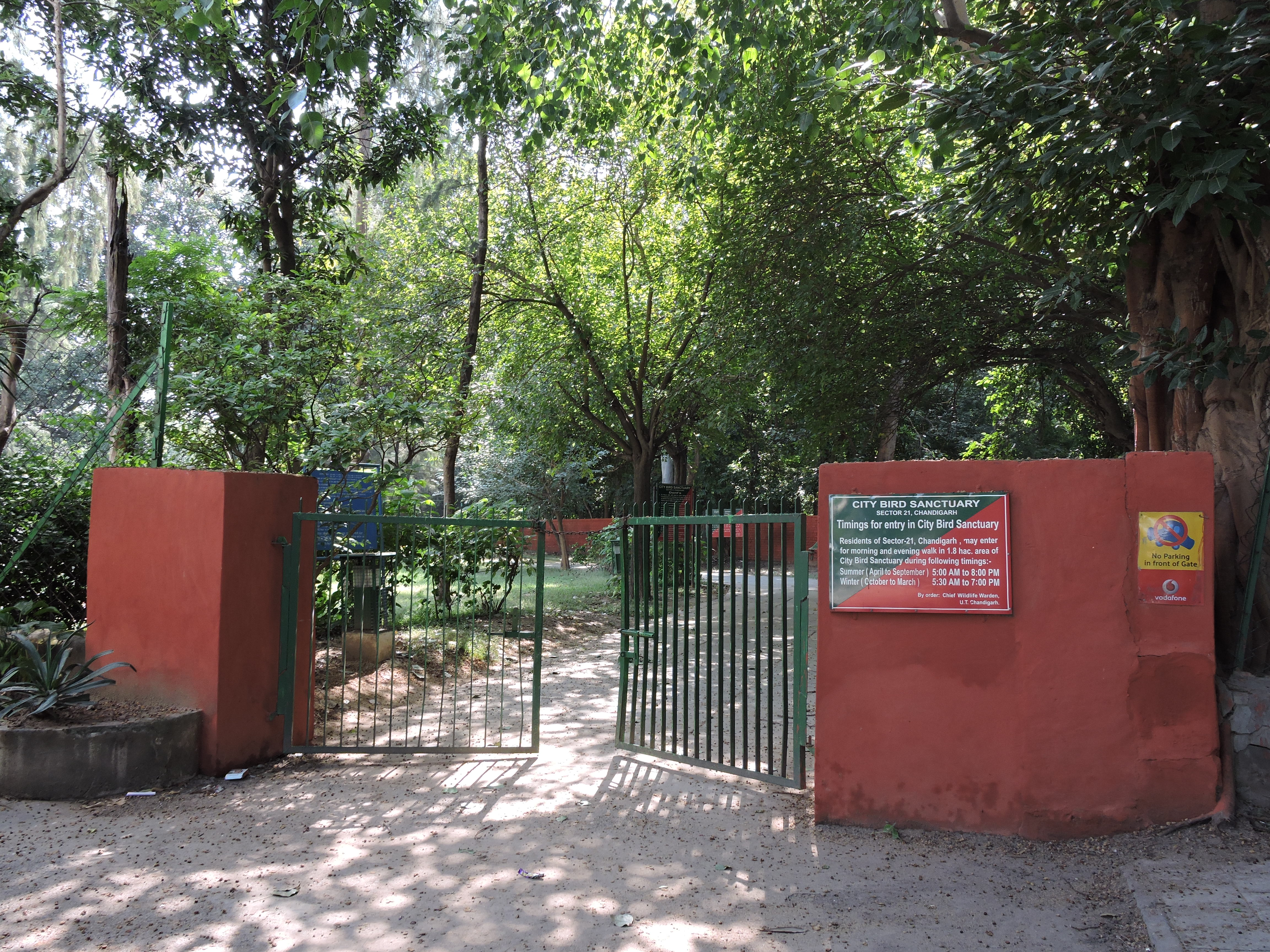
- City bird sanctuary, Chandigarh, entrance

- Location within Chandigarh Location within India
- Interactive map of City Bird Sanctuary Chandigarh
- Nearest city: Panchkula Haryana, S.A.S.Nagar Mohali Punjab
- Coordinates: 30°43′30″N 76°46′45″E
- Established: 1998
- Governing body: Forest & Wildlife Department,Chandigarh U.T.Administration

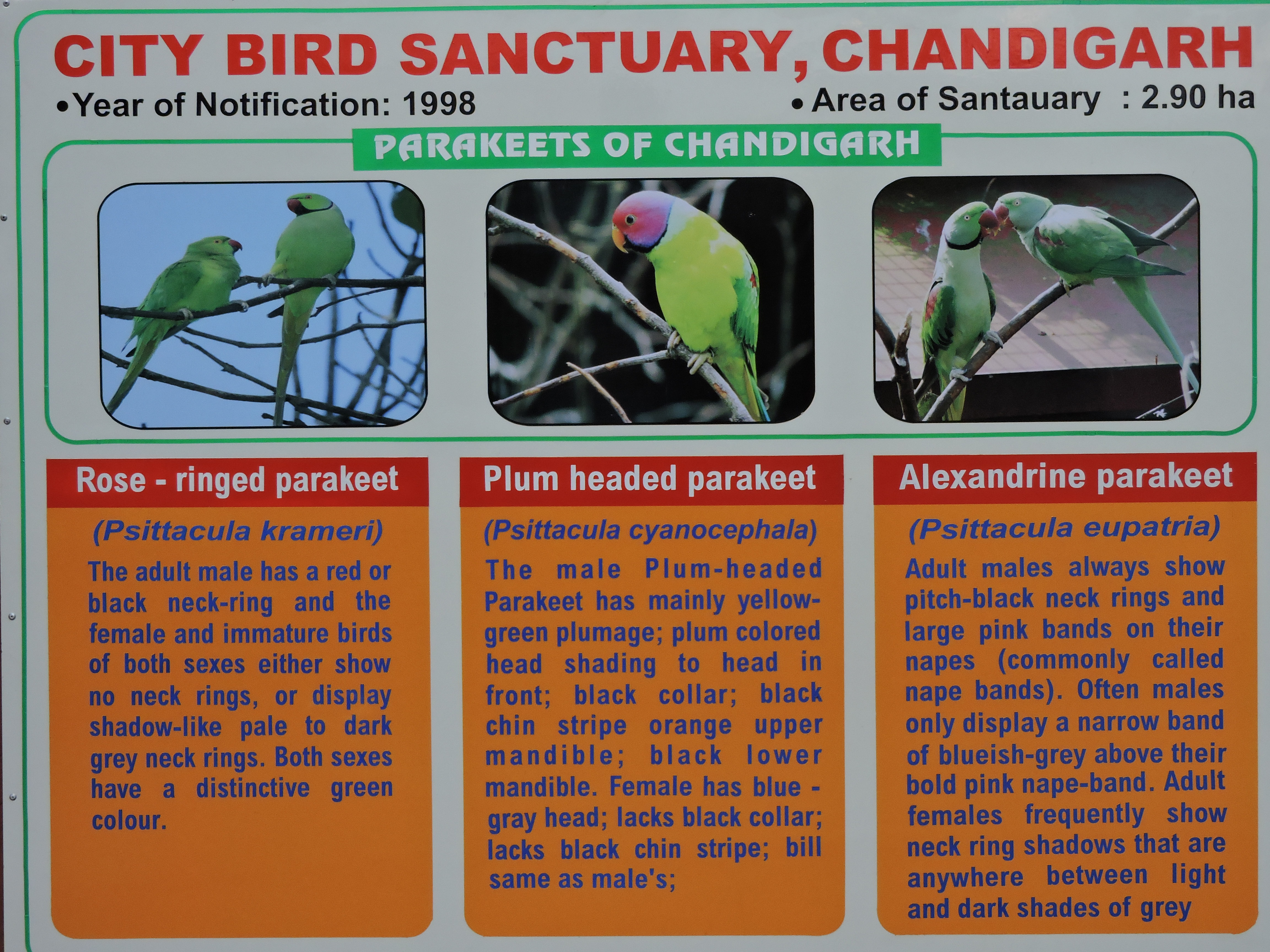
Parrot bird sanctuary Chandigarh

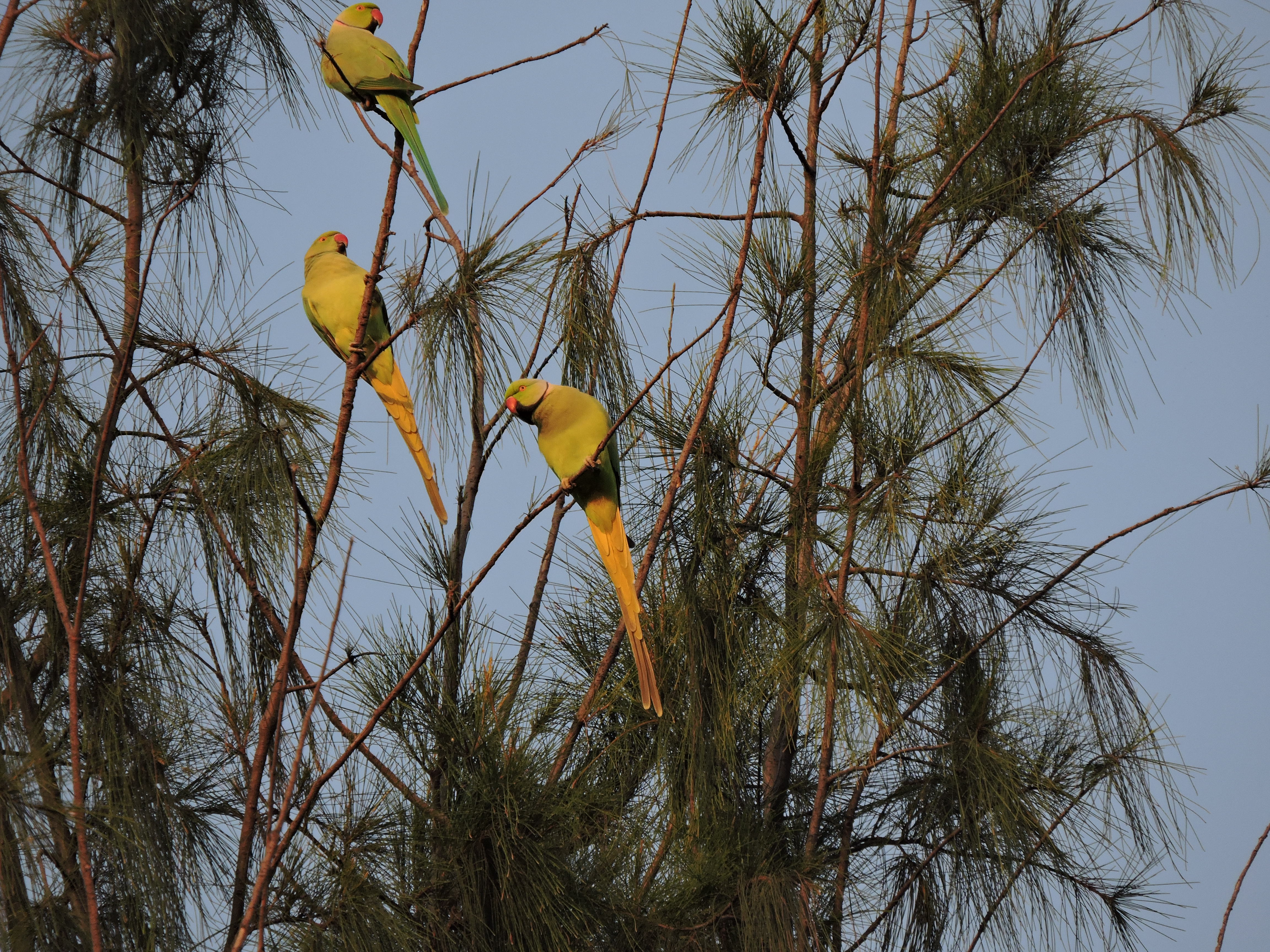
City bird Sanctuary, Chandigarh, India

City Bird Sanctuary Chandigarh or Parrot Bird Sanctuary Chandigarh is a bird sanctuary situated in sector 21 of the city of Chandigarh, India. It is primarily habitat of parrots. Hundreds of parrots live here. They fly in flocks in the morning and evening from here. There are two parks adjoining to this sanctuary. Flocks of parrots sit on the trees of these parks also. It is the second wildlife sanctuary of Chandigarh. Sukhna wildlife sanctuary near Sukhna Lake is another wildlife sanctuary of the city. It is notified under Section 18 of the Wildlife (Protection) Act, 1972.

The parrots wake up and sleep as per Photoperiodism. The Municipal Corporation of U.T., Chandigarh installed high post lights affecting the sleep pattern of the parrots. The Tribune (Chandigarh) highlighted the problem caused to the parrots after a local resident and bird lover, Harman Singh Sidhu, brought the issue to their notice. The Wildlife Department, Chandigarh was apprised of the problem and the high post lights were switched off.

The park is also known for its beautifully designed benches, which the teenagers popularly refer to as "Taj Mahal Benches".

== Background and history ==
There is a patch of an area of 2.9 hectares of the Forest and Wildlife department here with trees and plants. An adequate green cover adjoining to residential area hare attracted a large number of birds especially parrots and it became a natural habitat for them for living and breeding. Keeping in view the presence of a large number of birds, primarily parrots, this area was notified as bird sanctuary in 1998. Out of total area of 2.9 hectares, 1.80 hectares area is open to the citizens for walk under Chapter IV of the Wildlife Act (1972) and rest of 1.10 hectares area is restricted as per Act.

== Development and ecology ==
In 2010, there was a proposal to earmark a portion of this area for e-Sampark such as setting up of an office for service delivery of citizen of the area. The city administration ultimately decided to keep the whole of the area of 2.9 hectares as bird sanctuary.

== First bird sanctuary amidst city ==
This is the first bird sanctuary of the country which is situated within the populated city.

== Declining parrot population ==
Despite the creation of parrot bird sanctuary the number of parrots is declining. It is reported that a decade ago number of parrots was more than 10,000, but now, it is around 2,000. More needs to be done, trees liked by the parrots need to be planted and preserved to ensure their population increases.

== Gallery ==
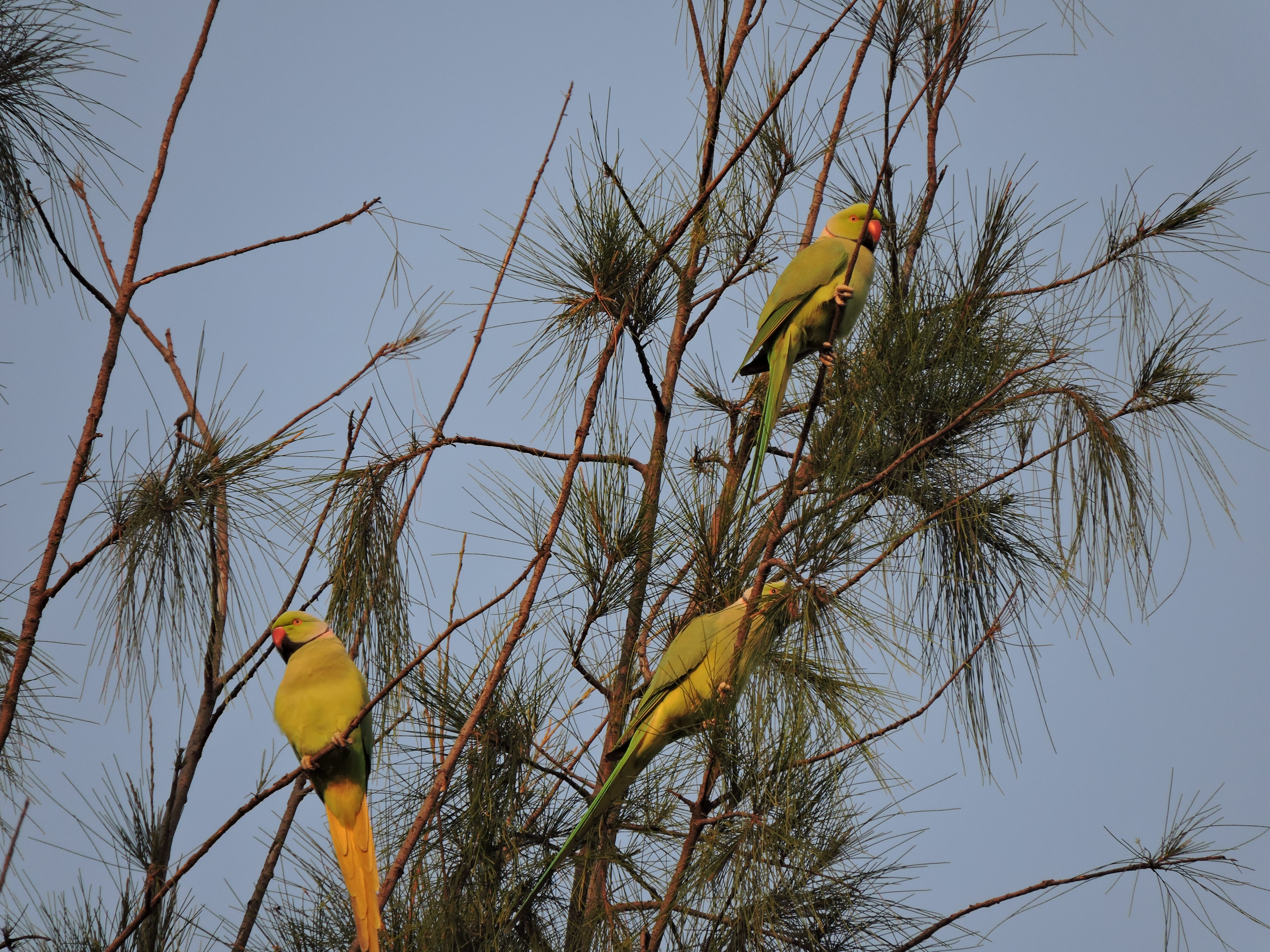
Parrot bird sanctuary, Chandigarh, India

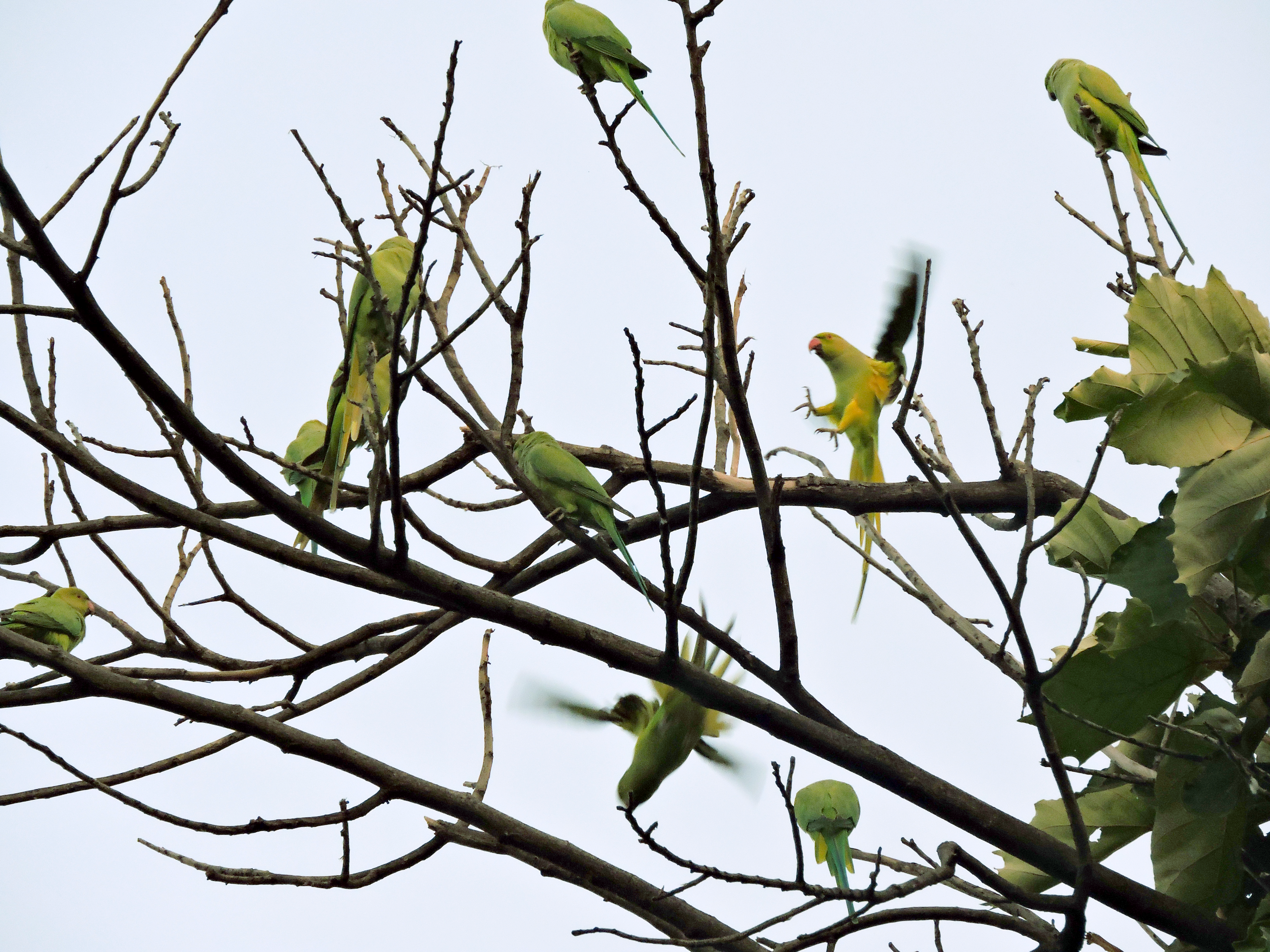
Flock of parrots, Parrot bird sanctuary, Chandigarh, India

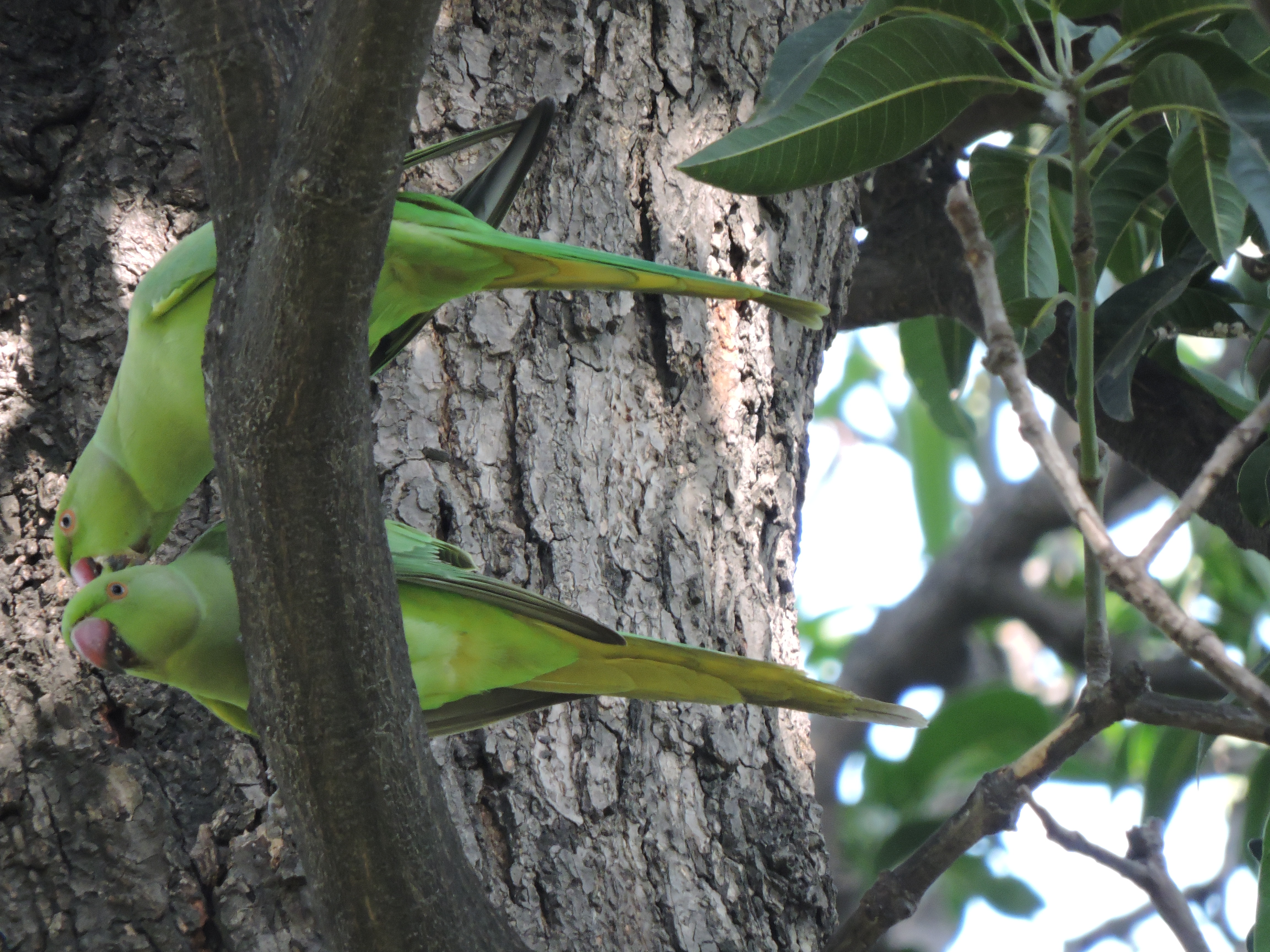
City bird sanctuary, Chandigarh, India

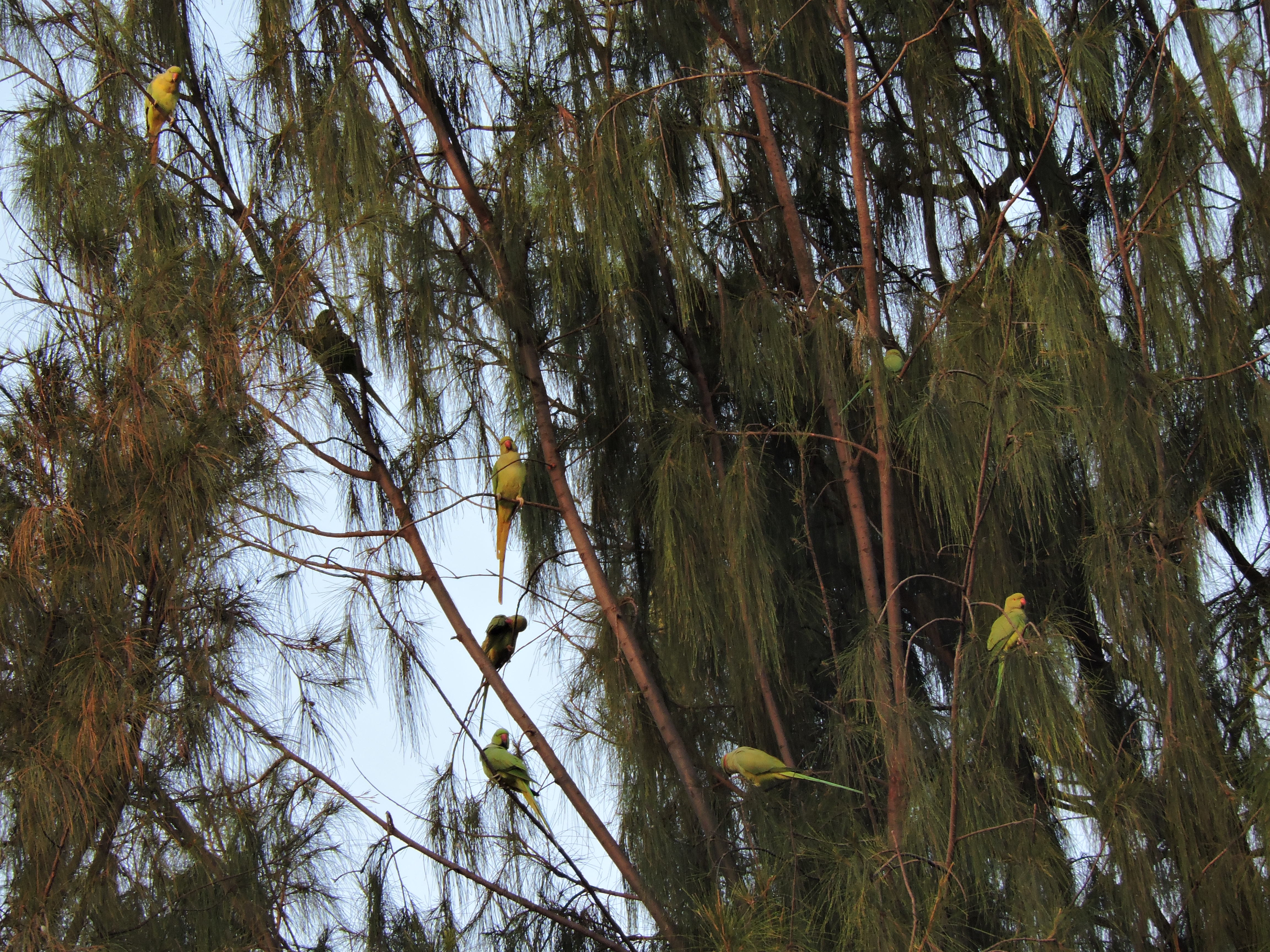
Parrots flock, City bird sanctuary, Chandigarh, India

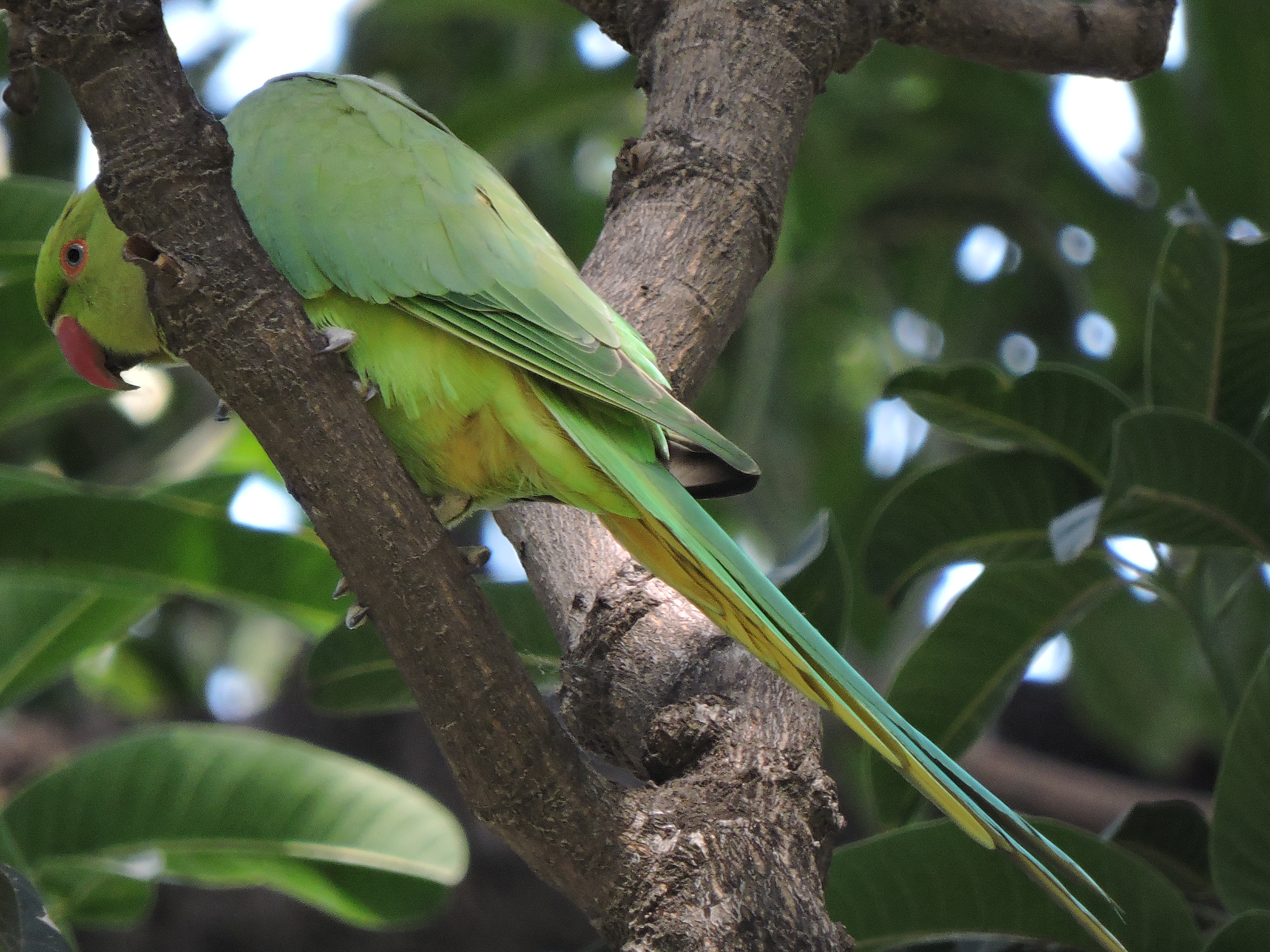
City bird sanctuary, Chandigarh, India

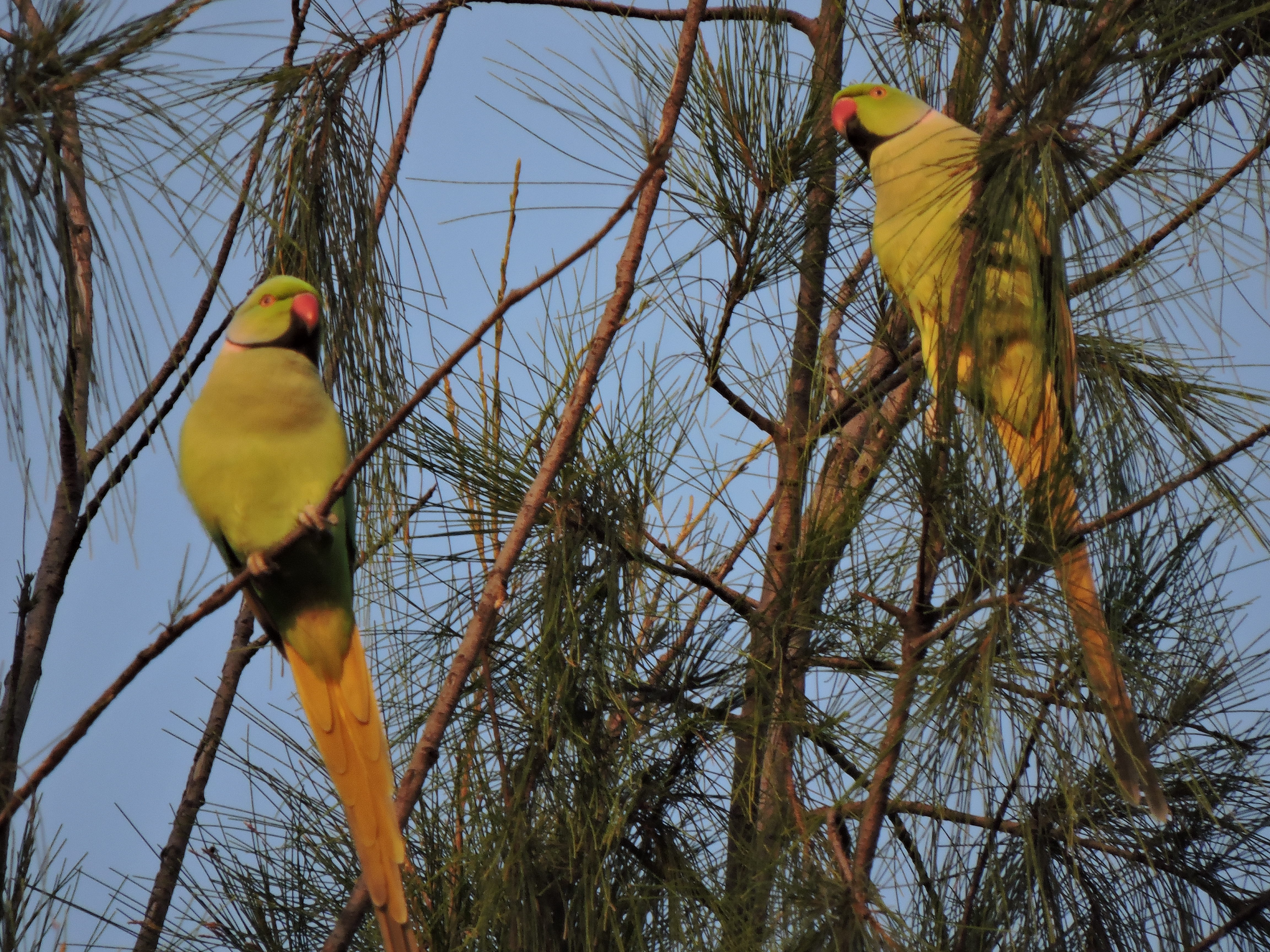
Parrot bird sanctuary, chandigarh, India
