= Estate Office, Chandigarh =

Government office managing property allotment and enforcement in Chandigarh, India

- संपदा कार्यालय, चंडीगढ़
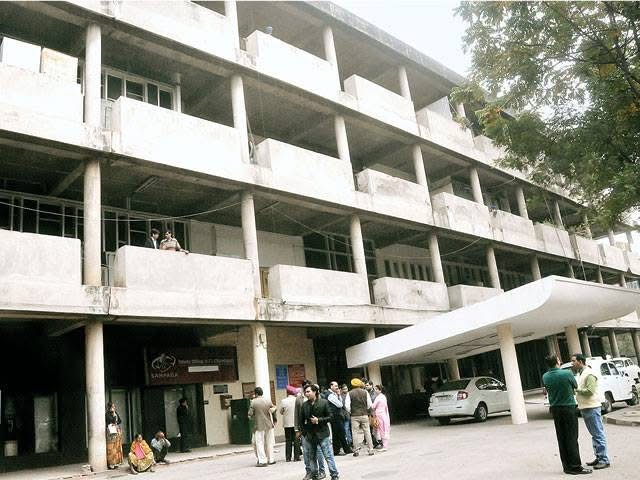
- DC Office & Estate Office, Chandigarh

Government office overview
- Jurisdiction: Chandigarh (Union Territory), India
- Headquarters: Town Hall Building, Sector 17C, Chandigarh 160017, India
- Government office executive: Sh. Nishant Kumar Yadav, Deputy Commissioner Cum Estate Officer UT Chandigarh
- Parent Government office: Chandigarh Administration
- Website: https://estateoffice.chd.gov.in/

Estate Office, Chandigarh is a property administration office of the Chandigarh Administration responsible for management of government land and sites in the Union Territory of Chandigarh. It handles allotment, transfer and resumption/cancellation of properties, recovery of dues, and enforcement action for violations of building rules and lease conditions.

== History ==
In September 2021, several estate-related services were moved online after proceedings in the Supreme Court of India concerning harassment complaints and delays.

By 2024–2025, newspapers highlighted increasing pressure to clear pending cases, digitise records, and improve transparency.

In March 2026, the office told the UT Administrator's Advisory Council that it planned a further end-to-end digitisation drive, including online submission of documents so that applicants would no longer need to visit in person.

== Services ==
The Estate Office administers property-related services for residential, commercial and institutional sites in Chandigarh, including transfer of ownership and lease rights, mutation of property records, issuance of no-dues and no-objection certificates, conversion of tenure, and online verification of property and dues. Services have been moved online in phases since 2021, and many are now notified for time-bound delivery under the Punjab Right to Service Act, 2011 as extended to Chandigarh.

=== Online services and rollout ===
On 28 September 2021, the UT Administrator launched the Estate Office website and the first phase of five online services, replacing manual, in-person processes that had been criticised for delays and lack of transparency. The first phase included transfer of ownership on the basis of a registered sale, gift, exchange or family-transfer deed; transfer of lease rights by registered deed; grant of permission or NOC for transfer of lease rights; issuance of a no-dues certificate; and an updated "Know Your Property" facility. An SMS-based status service and electronic payment through the State Bank of India were introduced at the same time.

In July 2025, the office launched an auto-mutation system that updates ownership records automatically once a property deed is registered, without a separate application from the buyer.

=== Key services ===
Selected Estate Office services
Service	Description	Launched / time limit	Source
Online services portal	Launch of the Estate Office website and first phase of online services, with SMS status updates and online payment via SBI.	28 September 2021	
Transfer of ownership	Change of ownership on the basis of a registered sale, gift, exchange or family-transfer deed.	Online since 28 September 2021; 30 days (uncontested) under RTS	
Transfer of lease rights	Transfer of lease rights on the basis of a registered deed of sale, gift, exchange or family transfer.	Online since 28 September 2021	
NOC for transfer of lease rights	Grant of permission / no-objection certificate for transfer of lease rights (sale, gift, exchange or family transfer).	Online since 28 September 2021; 50 days (uncontested) under RTS	
No-Dues Certificate (NDC)	Issuance of a no-dues certificate after clearance of any outstanding dues on a property.	Online since 28 September 2021; 15 days under RTS	
Know Your Property	Online facility to view property ownership and record details held by the Estate Office.	Online since 28 September 2021	
Auto-mutation of property	Automatic mutation of ownership records on registration of a property deed, via real-time integration between the Sub-Registrar Office and the Estate Office; completed within about a week of registration without a separate application.	7 July 2025	
Conversion from leasehold to freehold	Conversion of a property's tenure from leasehold to freehold.	35 days under RTS	
Conversion from SCF to SCO	Conversion of a property from shop-cum-flat (SCF) to shop-cum-office (SCO).	30 days under RTS	
Change of partners in a firm	Change of partners in a partnership firm holding a property, after public notice.	20 days under RTS	
Appeals and adjudication	Handling statutory appeals and pending cases.	180-day deadline for statutory appeals (December 2025)	
FIFO processing	First-come-first-served workflow for applications to curb favouritism.	December 2025	

=== Time-bound delivery under Right to Service Act ===
The Estate Office's property services have been progressively notified for time-bound delivery under the Punjab Right to Service Act, as extended to Chandigarh, fixing deadlines and designating appellate authorities for each service. In a notification reported in April 2026, the UT Administration notified time-bound delivery of 90 more services across departments, including 35 services of the Estate Office. The notified timelines include a no-objection certificate for sale, gift or transfer of lease rights (uncontested) within 50 days; change of ownership or leasehold rights on the basis of a sale or gift deed (uncontested) within 30 days; issuance of a no-dues certificate within 15 days; conversion from leasehold to freehold within 35 days; change of partners in a partnership firm after public notice within 20 days; and conversion from shop-cum-flat to shop-cum-office within 30 days.

== Notable actions and issues ==
=== Case backlogs ===
After a fatal hearing incident, the Estate Office fast-tracked disposal of pending cases and cleared nearly a thousand cases in a short span.

=== Enforcement drives ===
The Estate Office has issued notices and dismantled unauthorised structures at major properties such as Hotel Taj and Elante Mall. Later that month, the Enforcement Wing demolished unauthorised construction at Chandigarh Club in Sector 1, coordinating police, fire and health department teams for the operation. In April 2026, following demolition drives in Sectors 41 and 45, the Estate Office and Chandigarh Housing Board issued notices to 386 homeowners in Sectors 29 and 30 over unauthorised construction and misuse of residential plots.

=== Records and document integrity ===
Two employees were arrested in December 2025 for alleged tampering with official property records.

=== Legal and regulatory developments ===
A proposed amendment to the Capital of Punjab (Development and Regulation) Act 1952, which would let the UT Administration rationalise penalties for building violations and misuse, was cleared by the Punjab Governor and UT Administrator and forwarded to the Ministry of Home Affairs in March 2026; the draft sets daily per-square-foot penalty rates that vary by property type and proposes protecting past enforcement action from challenge on technical grounds. In May 2026, the Chandigarh Consumer Disputes Redressal Commission directed the Estate Office to withdraw a roughly ₹43-lakh conversion-charge demand raised against a resident more than a decade after the original transaction, finding the office had failed to justify the increase.
