= NIC State Centre Chandigarh =

State unit of India's National Informatics Centre

National Informatics Centre, Chandigarh State Centre
Agency overview
- Jurisdiction: Chandigarh union territory
- Headquarters: UT Secretariat, Sector 9D, Chandigarh
- Agency executive: Manie Khaneja, State Informatics Officer (Scientist-G)
- Parent agency: National Informatics Centre, Ministry of Electronics and Information Technology
- Website: nicchandigarh.nic.in

National Informatics Centre, Chandigarh State Centre (NIC Chandigarh, also styled the Chandigarh UT Centre) is the Chandigarh union-territory unit of the National Informatics Centre (NIC), the information-technology organisation of India's Ministry of Electronics and Information Technology. The centre provides e-governance infrastructure and digital services to the Chandigarh Administration and to central-government offices located in the city, and acts as a network hub for NIC units in and around Chandigarh.

== History ==
NIC began operations in the territory in 1990 from the office of the Deputy Commissioner, Chandigarh. As demand for its services grew, the unit moved to a stand-alone office in the Chandigarh Administration Secretariat building in 1993. A regional leased-line network was commissioned in 2003 to link offices of the district collectorates of Punjab, Haryana and Chandigarh, the Punjab and Haryana High Court, the two state secretariats and other departments in the territory; it was later extended towards Himachal Pradesh and Jammu and Kashmir. The Network and Data Centre established in 2004 was subsequently adopted by the Chandigarh Administration as the State Data Centre. A 6,100 sq ft mini-cloud facility became operational in February 2022.

== Organisational structure ==
NIC operates a three-tier field structure consisting of its headquarters in New Delhi, a State or Union Territory Centre in each state and union territory, and District Centres in the districts.

=== State Centre ===
A State or UT Centre is the apex NIC field unit for its territory. It is headed by a State Informatics Officer (SIO), a senior officer of the NIC technical cadre who serves as the principal technical adviser to the state or union-territory government on information and communication technology. The State Centre owns the territory-wide infrastructure — the state data centre, the state wide area network headquarters, the National Knowledge Network point of presence, messaging, hosting and video-conferencing facilities — and carries out software design, development and implementation for departments of the state government, along with the rollout of national mission-mode projects within the territory. In Chandigarh the State Centre is located at Room 222, UT Secretariat, Sector 9D, and also serves as the network hub for NIC units in the surrounding region, extending infrastructure services to neighbouring Punjab and Haryana.

=== District Centre ===
A District Centre is the field office attached to a district administration. It is headed by a District Informatics Officer (DIO), assisted where sanctioned by an Additional District Informatics Officer (ADIO), and works under the technical control of the State Centre while functioning day to day alongside the District Magistrate or Deputy Commissioner. District Centres take national and state applications to the ground: they run local implementation, training, technical support and consultancy for district-level offices such as the collectorate, treasury, revenue and land-record branches, courts, transport authorities and health institutions, and undertake small-scale development at the request of the District Magistrate. District Centres trace their origin to the District Information System of the National Informatics Centre (DISNIC) programme, under which NIC extended NICNET connectivity to district headquarters from the late 1980s.

Chandigarh is a single-district union territory, so the district-level functions are discharged from within the same territorial unit rather than through a separate network of offices; the Chandigarh UT Centre maintains a District Centres listing on its website. NIC literature on Chandigarh accordingly attributes some department-level rollouts, such as the eTula legal-metrology system for the Department of Consumer Affairs and Legal Metrology, to the District Centre, and territory-wide infrastructure and flagship applications to the UT Centre.

=== Comparison ===
Aspect	State / UT Centre	District Centre
Head	State Informatics Officer (SIO)	District Informatics Officer (DIO), assisted by an ADIO
Administrative counterpart	State or union-territory government and its departments	District Magistrate or Deputy Commissioner and district offices
Reporting	NIC headquarters, New Delhi	State or UT Centre, for technical direction
Infrastructure owned	State data centre, SWAN headquarters, NKN point of presence, messaging and hosting services	Local area networks, mini data centre, video-conference studio at the district headquarters
Typical work	Design, development and hosting of state-level applications; rollout of mission-mode projects	Implementation, training, support and consultancy for district offices; small local applications

== Infrastructure and network services ==
The centre provides cloud, domain registration, email, hosting, security and data-centre services as part of the Digital India programme, and a NIC mini-cloud was made operational in the Chandigarh unit among ten state units. The Chandigarh State Data Centre operates on a round-the-clock basis and includes a storage area network shared across servers, with major departments of the administration connected over high-speed links.

Under the Chandigarh State Wide Area Network (CSWAN), major offices of the administration together with eSampark, eJanSampark and GramSampark centres were connected, along with seven points of presence including the Municipal Corporation, the Deputy Commissioner's office, two Sub-Divisional Magistrate offices, two government hospitals and the Registration and Licensing Authority. Under the National Knowledge Network the centre provides high-speed connectivity to educational and research institutions in the territory and neighbouring states, including Panjab University.

The centre operates a video-conferencing studio at the UT Secretariat along with fifteen further studios in departments, manages more than 7,200 government email accounts, and hosts and maintains 67 websites for territorial and central-government departments, most of them built on NIC's S3WAAS framework and compliant with the Guidelines for Indian Government Websites.

== Applications and projects ==
The centre has designed, deployed and supported a range of citizen-facing and internal government systems for the Chandigarh Administration, including:

- eDistrict Chandigarh, a workflow system delivering about 25 certificate-based services integrated with Aadhaar, eTaal and DigiLocker
- Estate Office Property Management System, through which the Estate Office delivers 21 online services
- Vahan and Sarathi, the national vehicle-registration and driving-licence systems, operational in the territory since 2015 with faceless services added in May 2022
- eHospital, deployed at Government Medical College and Hospital, Sector 32, Government Multi-Specialty Hospital, Sector 16, and subordinate institutions
- Manav Sampada, an electronic human-resource management system implemented across 75 departments
- eOffice, introduced in November 2017 with two departments and later extended to all departments of the administration and the Municipal Corporation
- Composite Financial Accounting System, covering payroll, budget, treasury and receipts management
- Online Jamabandi, a land-record system for the Revenue Department
- eAwas, eVigilance, eGazette, eAuction and Swagatam, covering house allotment, vigilance clearance, official gazette publication, auctions and appointment management

In 2022 the centre digitised a large group of services on the ServicePlus low-code framework, which were launched at a territorial event in May 2022 for departments including the Chandigarh Housing Board, the Excise and Taxation Department, the Transport Department and the Estate Office, alongside 26 social-welfare schemes. Court computerisation covers the district courts of the territory as well as the State Consumer Disputes Redressal Commission. The centre has also supported citizen-facing property and document registration through the National Generic Document Registration System.

The Ministry of External Affairs, in collaboration with NIC, launched the e-Sanad document-attestation and apostille portal at an event held in Chandigarh.

== Recognition ==
The centre's work has been recognised with national awards for web presence and government websites, the Golden Icon Award for eSampark, and the CSI-Nihilent award for best e-governed state or union territory.

== See also ==
- National Informatics Centre
- Digital India
- National e-Governance Plan
