= Sukhna Wildlife Sanctuary =

Wildlife sanctuary in Chandigarh, India

- Nature Trail Lake Reserve Forest
- IUCN category IV (habitat/species management area)
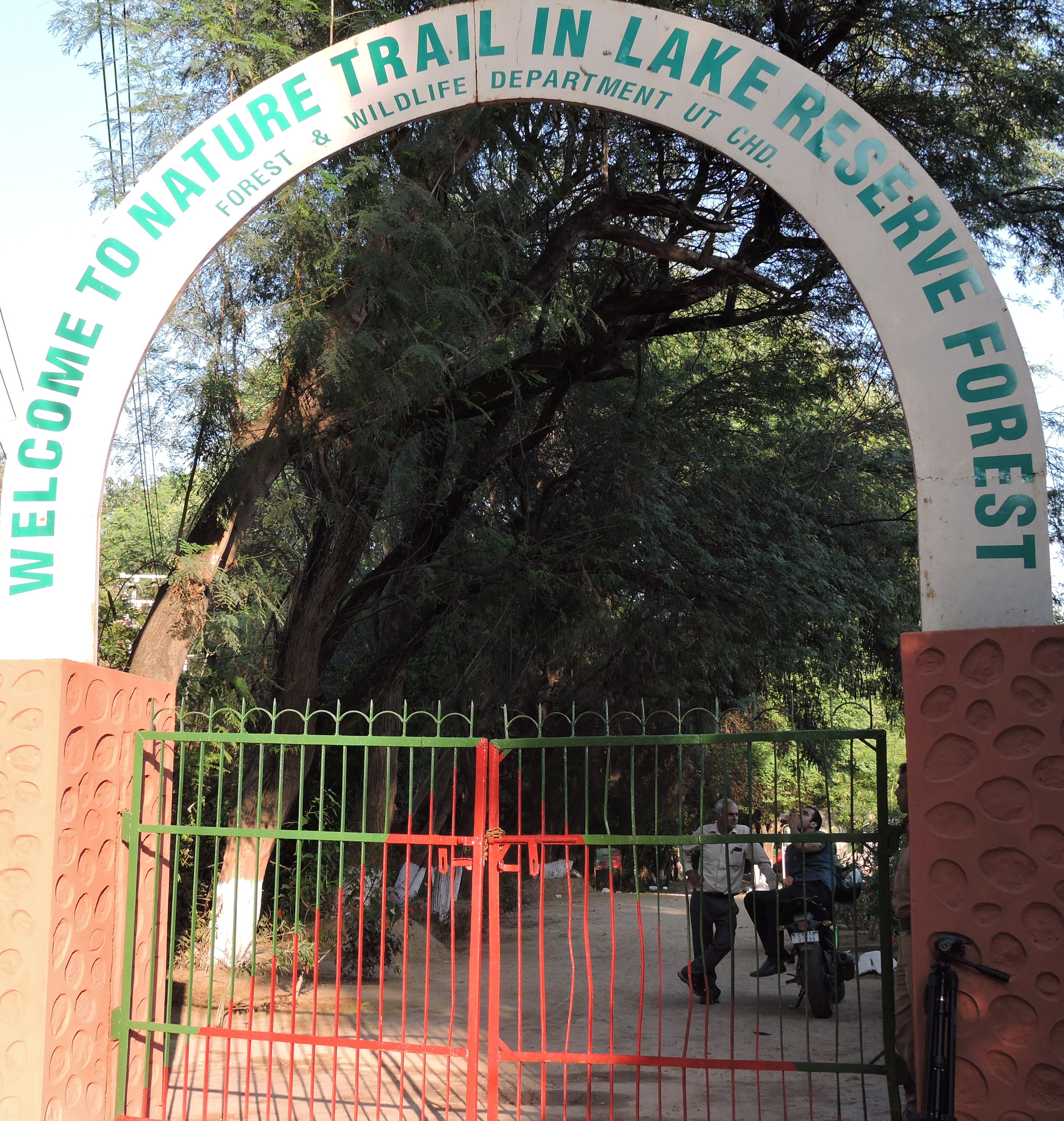
- Main entrance

- Location within Chandigarh Location within India
- Interactive map of Sukhna Wildlife Sanctuary
- Location: Near Sukhna Lake, Chandigarh
- Coordinates: 30°44′42″N 76°49′22″E
- Area: 2600 Hects.
- Established: 1998
- Governing body: Forest and Wildlife department Chandigarh Administration https://www.chandigarhforest.gov.in/
- Website: chandigarh.gov.in/green-chandigarh/sukhna-wildlife-sanctuary

The Sukhna Wildlife Sanctuary is a 2600 hectare (6400+ acres) nature preserve located in the Shivalik Hills of Chandigarh, India, near Sukhna Lake. The area was officially declared a wildlife sanctuary in 1998. The sanctuary is open to a limited number of visitors, and an entry pass is required, which is issued by the Forest Department Office (sector 19, Chandigarh). The reserve is typically not open to the public during the rainy season.

== Area and location ==
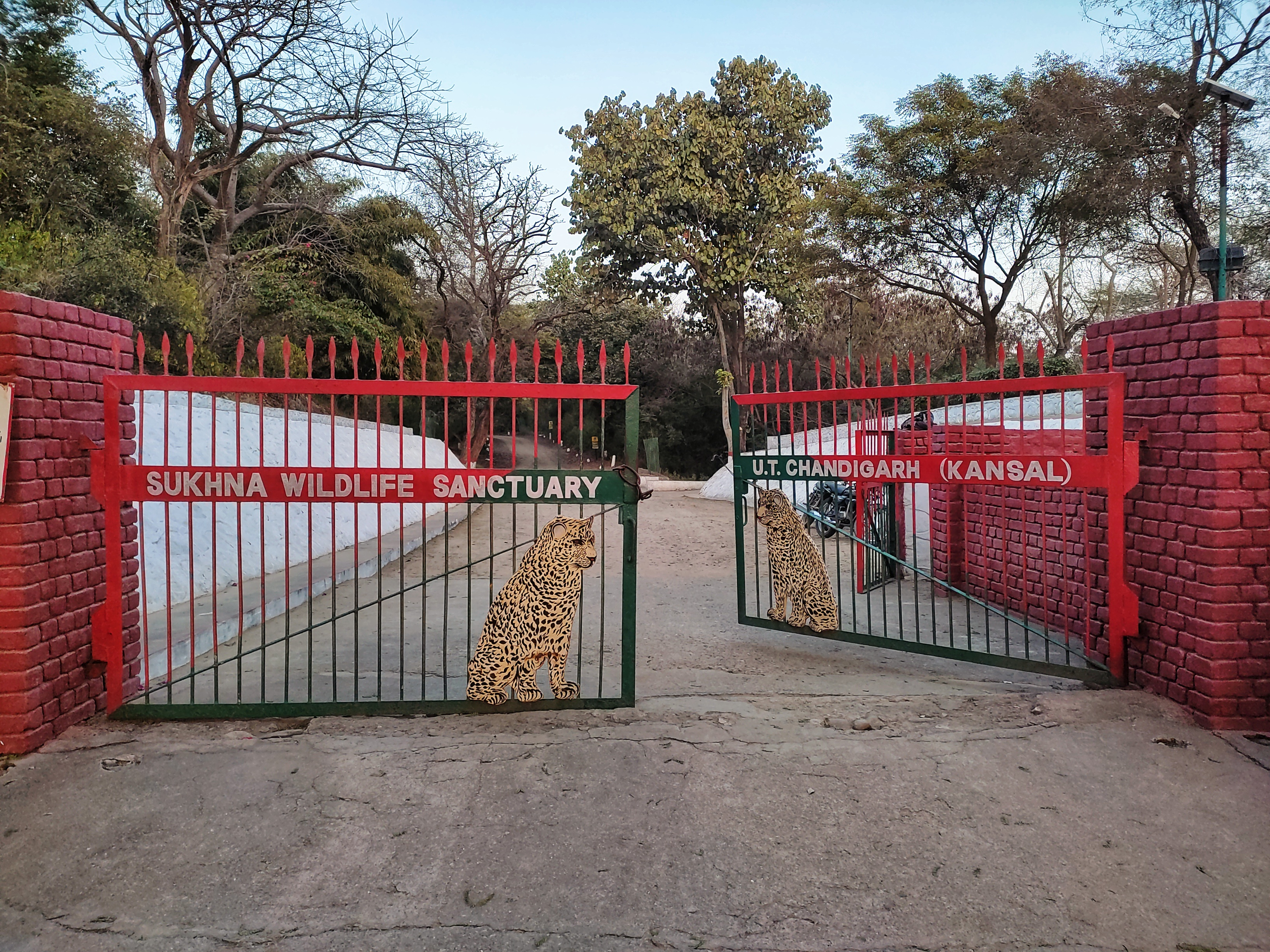
Entry near Kansal

The Sukhna Wildlife Sanctuary is a protected wildlife reserve situated about two kilometres from Sukhna Lake, in the centre-northwest of India. It spans an area of 26 square kilometres (2600 hectares; 6424.74 acres) of lightly wooded and shrub lands; the main areas include much of the Nepli Forest, as well as encompassing the plains at the foot of the Shivalik Hills. The rain-catchment region of Sukhna Lake partially falls in the area designated for the wildlife sanctuary.

== History ==
The history of Sukhna Lake and the Sukhna Wildlife Sanctuary is intertwined; the Lake was part of the original development plans for the city of Chandigarh, and was planned and erected over a period of years, beginning in 1958 and lasting through the 1970s. It was an artificial lake that was fed with rainwater from the catchment areas in the Shivalik Hills. Siltation was a big problem for Sukhna Lake, and had to be tackled effectively; the issue was minimized by many engineering and soil conservation methods. A large-scale afforestation program was implemented in the catchment area.

== Flora and fauna ==
The Sukhna Wildlife Sanctuary was declared a protected wildlife sanctuary in March 1998, as this hilly area was recognized for its fauna and substantial tree and forest growth. After becoming a reserve, more systematic and large-scale afforestation programs were undertaken, particularly in the water catchment areas, which ultimately resulted in an improved biodiversity and healthier flora. The Nepli Forest area grew in lushness over several decades, mainly through the managed plantings of nursery-grown native plants and trees. Numerous endemic trees, herbs, and other plants thrive in Sukhna, including Acacia leucophloea (raeru), Acacia modesta (phulai), Acacia nilotica (kikar), Justicia sp., Anogeissus latifolia (chhal), Azadirachta indica (neem), Bambusa vulgaris (golden bamboo), Bauhinia racemosa (kachnar/bidi leaf), Bombax ceiba (semal/cotton tree), Butea frondosa (dhakk), Cassia fistula (amaltas), Dalbergia sp. (shisham/rosewood), Diospyros montana (kendu/Indian ebony), Emblica officinalis (amla/gooseberry), Morus alba (tut/white mulberry), Murraya koenigii (kari patta/curry-leaf tree), Prosopis juliflora (mesquite), Senegalia catechu (khair), and Senna siamea (kassod).

Sukhna Wildlife Sanctuary has a rich variety of animal life, known to have one of the highest concentrations of sambar deer (Cervus unicolor) in the country. It is also home to other mammals including axis deer (chital), blue bull (nilgai), Hanuman langur, Indian flying fox, muntjac, palm squirrel, pangolin, Rhesus macaque and wild boar (jangali suar).

Numerous resident, migratory and breeding birds can be observed in the sanctuary; species include the Asian koel, barn owl, black bittern, black francolin, black redstart, black-rumped flameback, black and black-winged kite, blue peafowl, blue-tailed bee-eater, booted eagle, brown-headed barbet, common hawk-cuckoo, common myna, coot, cormorants, crimson and purple sunbird, greater coucal, greenish warbler, grey-winged blackbird, Indian grey hornbill, Indian paradise flycatcher, Indian pond-heron, Indian roller, Indian scops-owl, Indian spot-billed duck, Indian white-eye, jungle babbler, lesser whitethroat, lineated barbet, moorhen, mottled wood-owl, Indian pitta, Oriental honey-buzzard, Oriental pied hornbill, red junglefowl, red-vented bulbul, red-wattled lapwing, ring-necked parakeet, ruddy shelduck, scarlet and long-tailed minivet, shikra, Sind sparrow, spotted owlet, tufted duck, white wagtail, white-breasted waterhen and white-throated kingfisher.

== Gallery ==
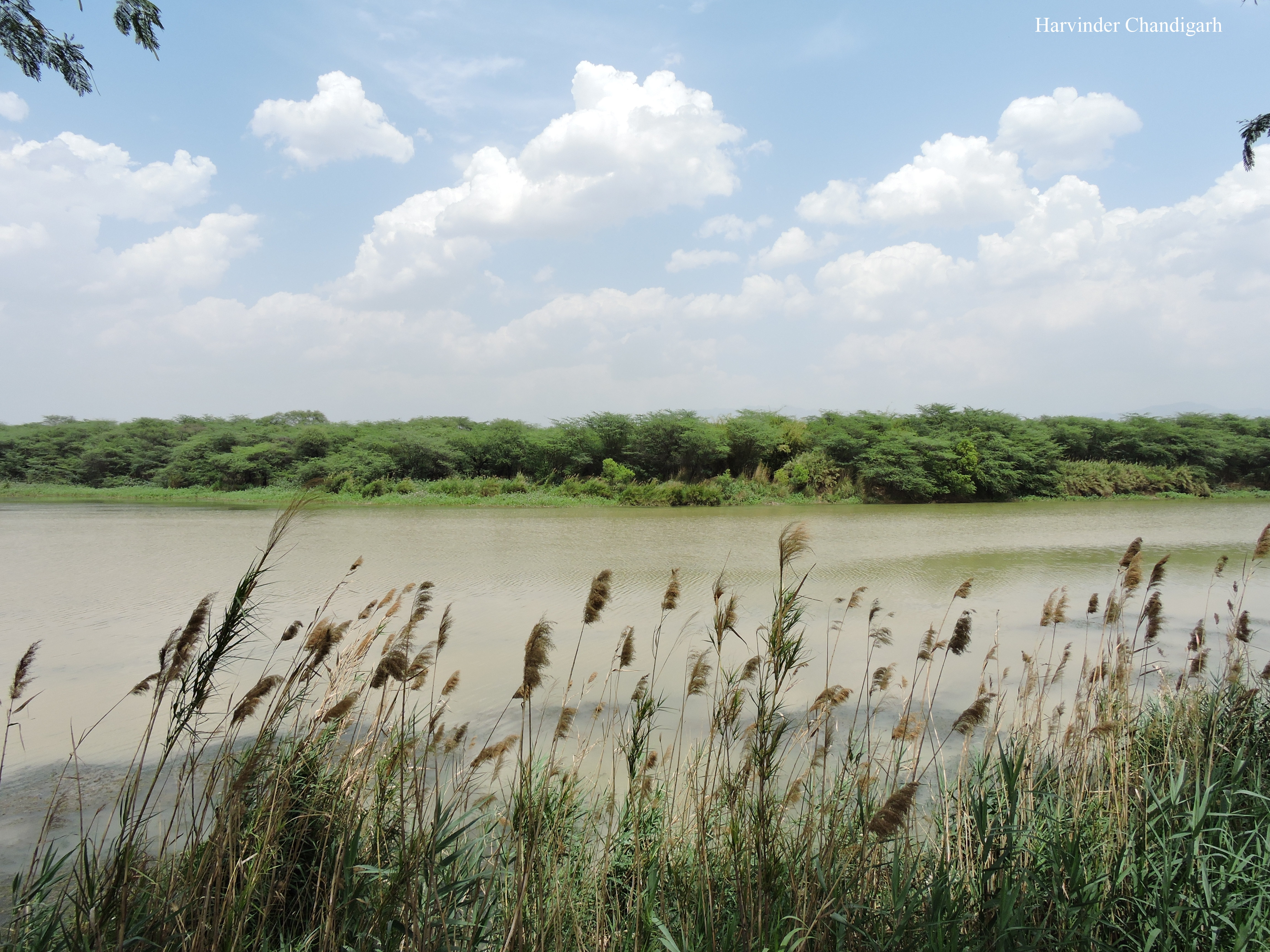
Sanctuary's view from Midway of Sukhna lake, Chandigarh

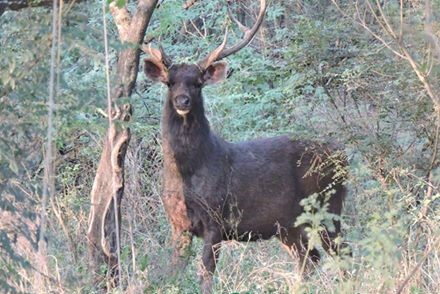

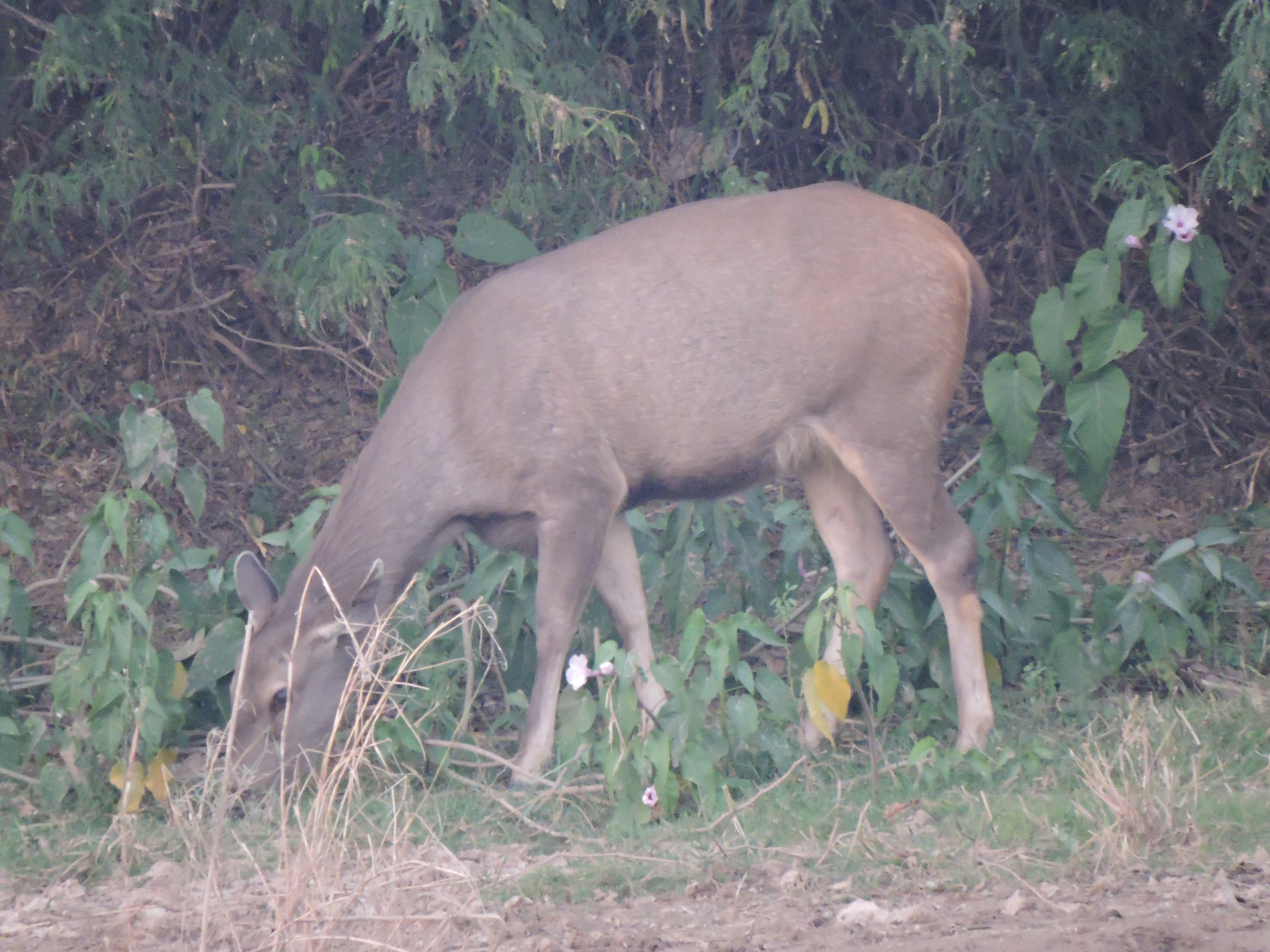

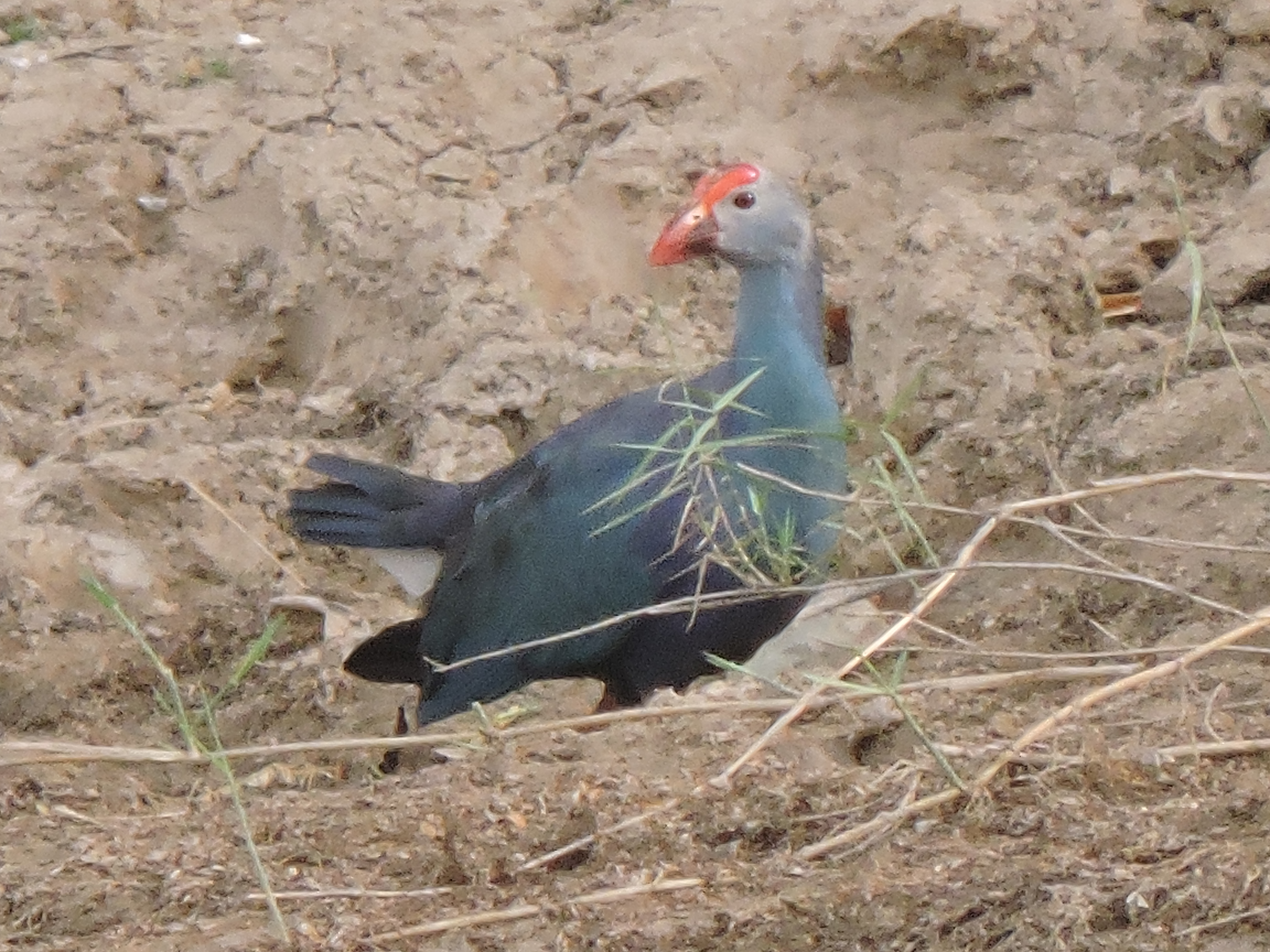

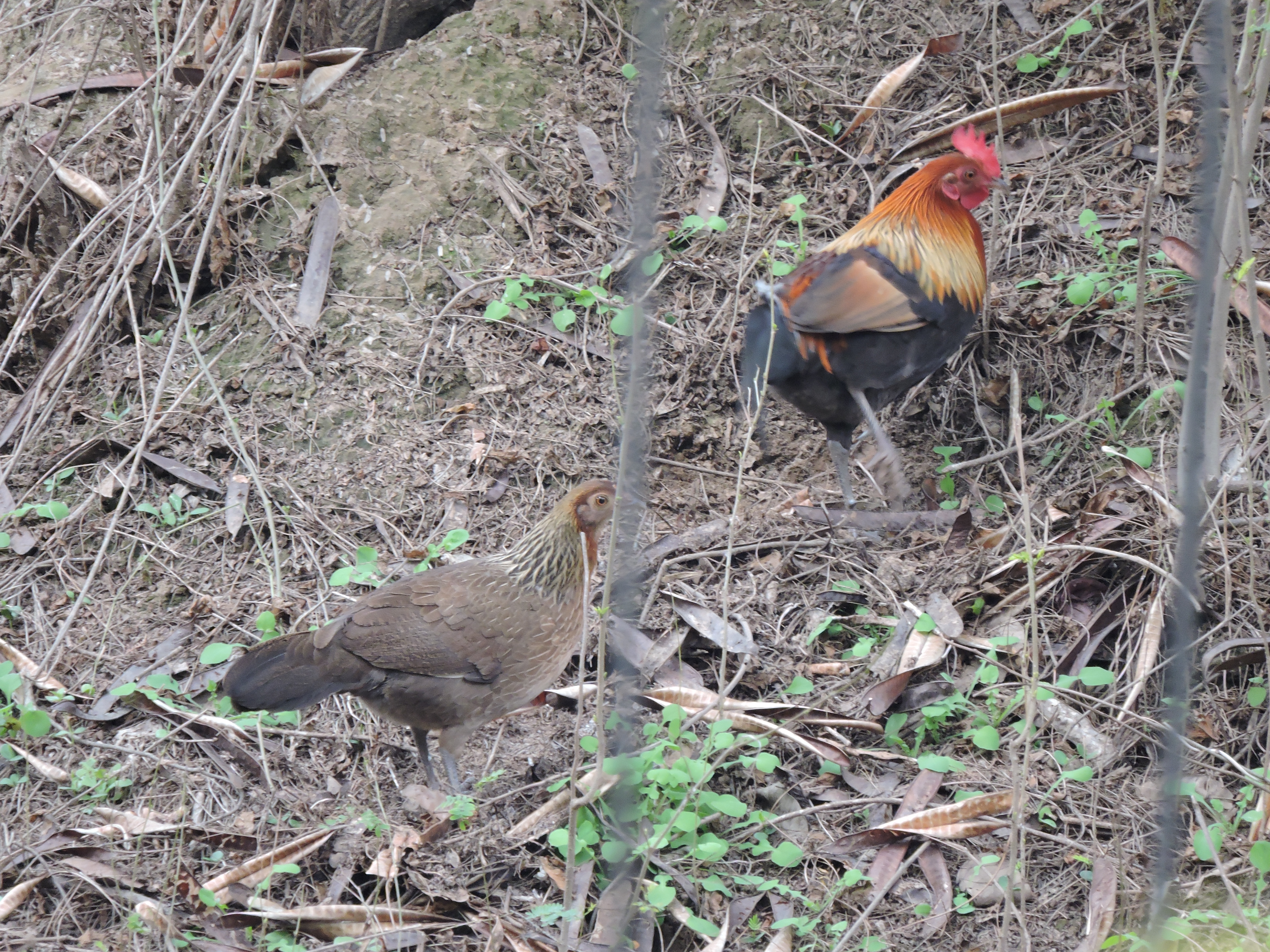

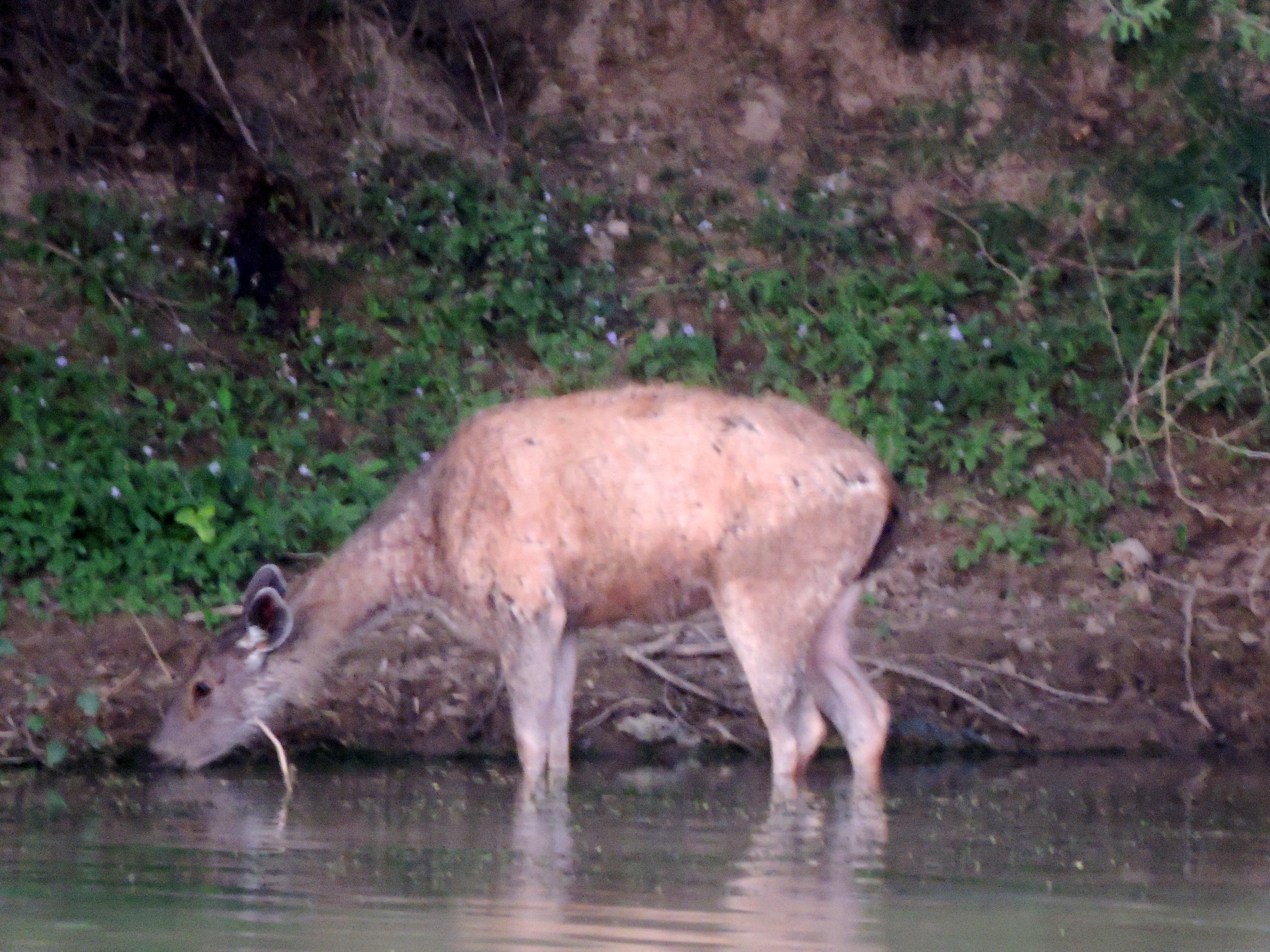

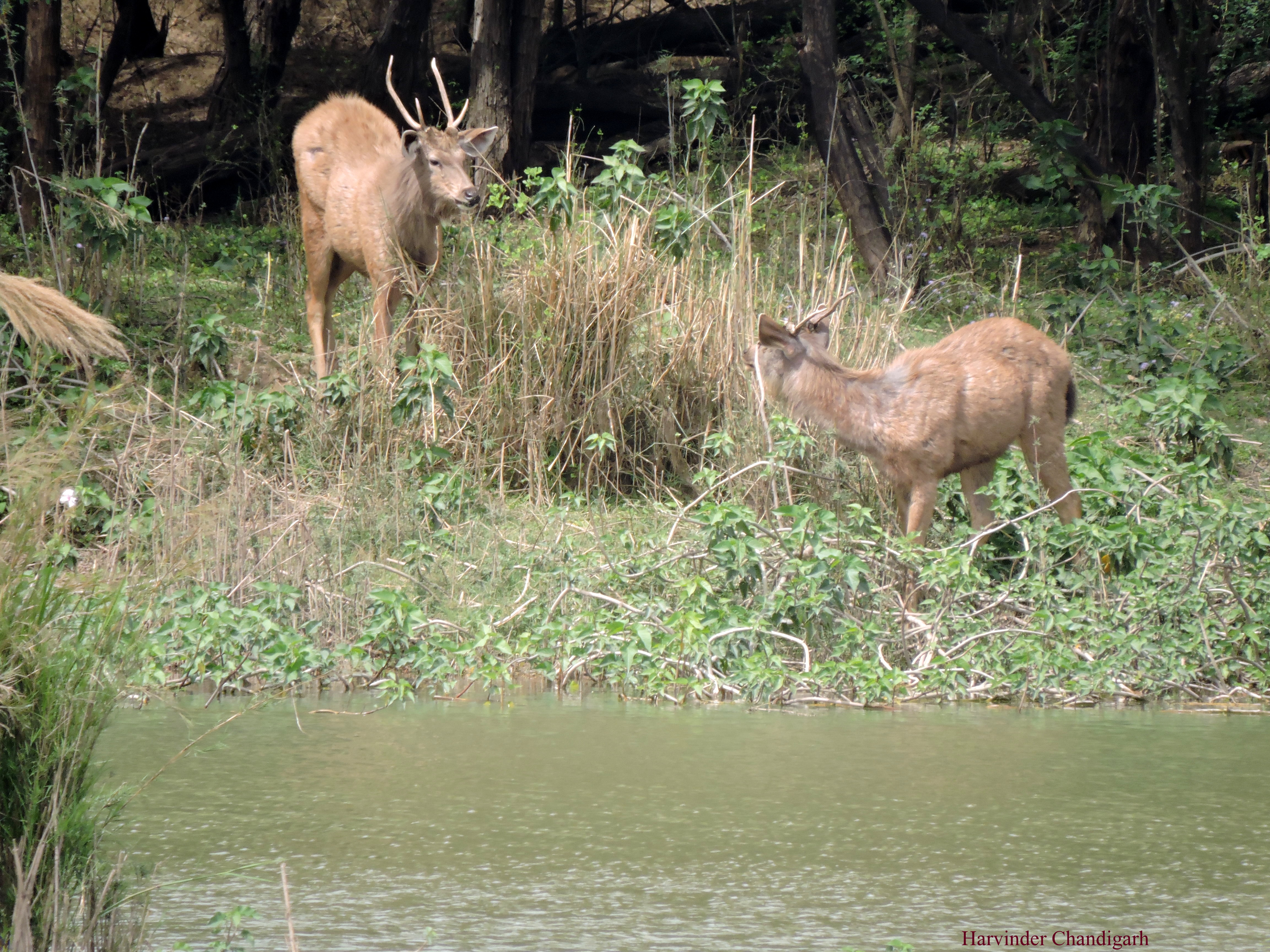

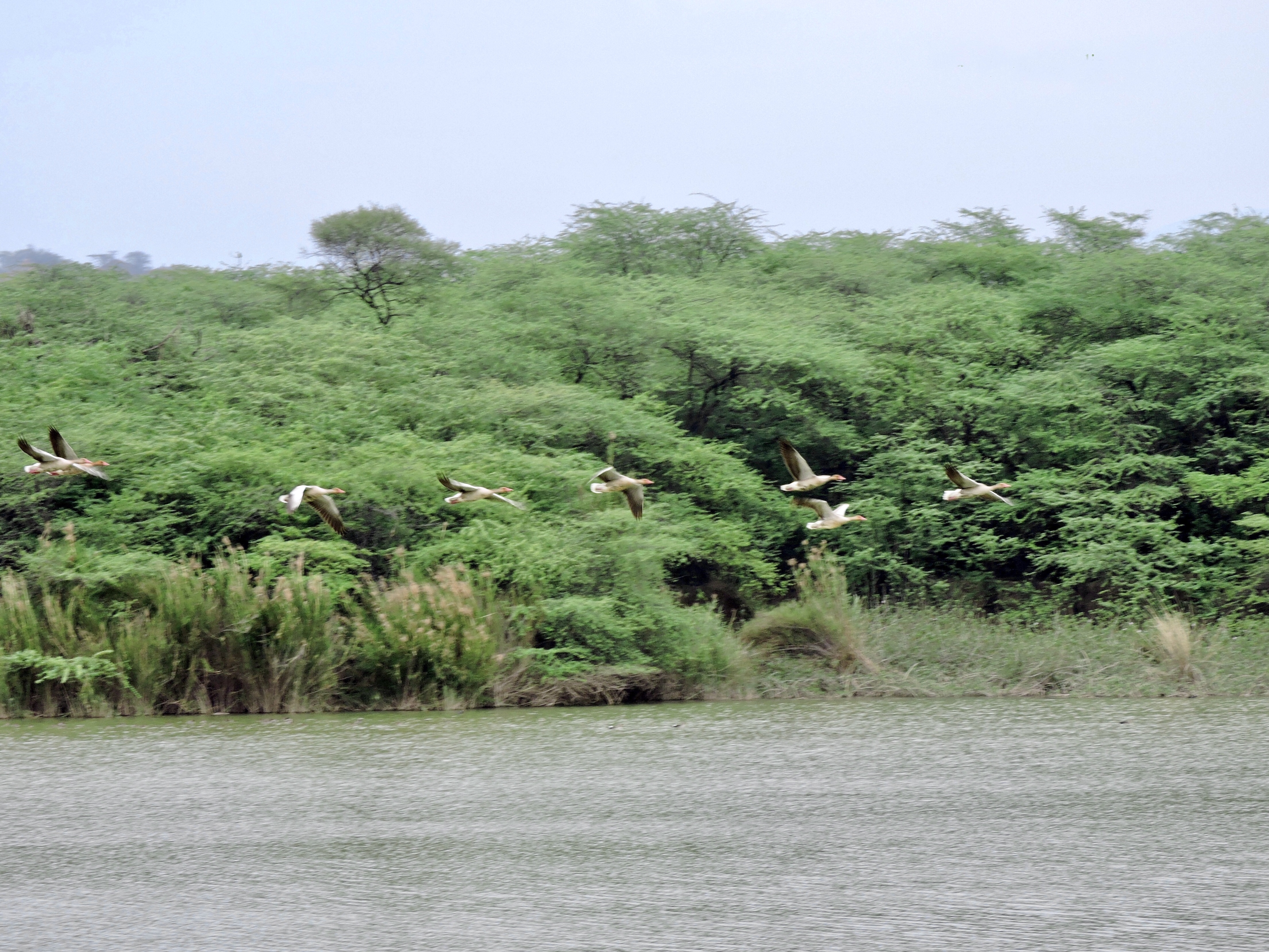

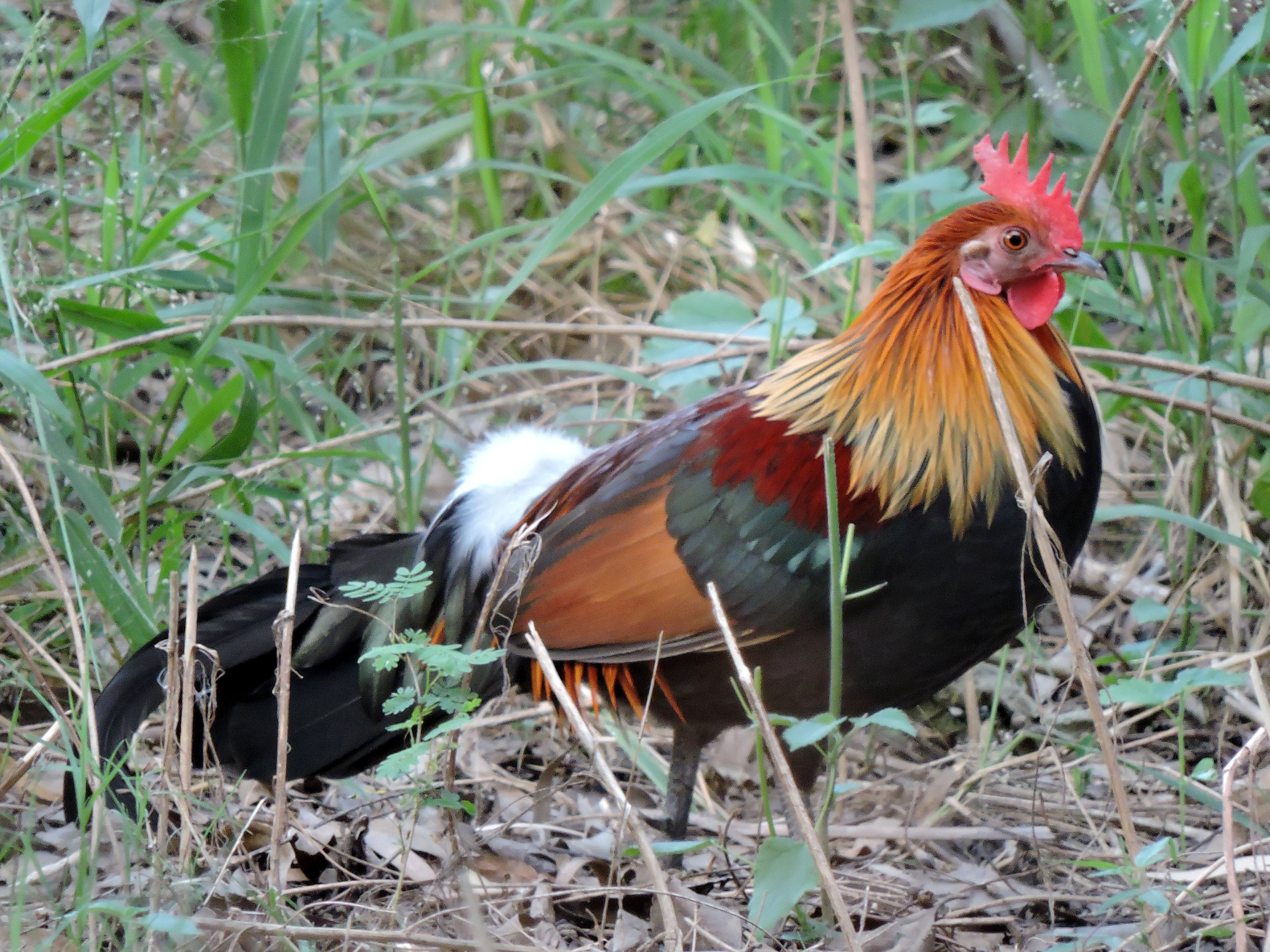

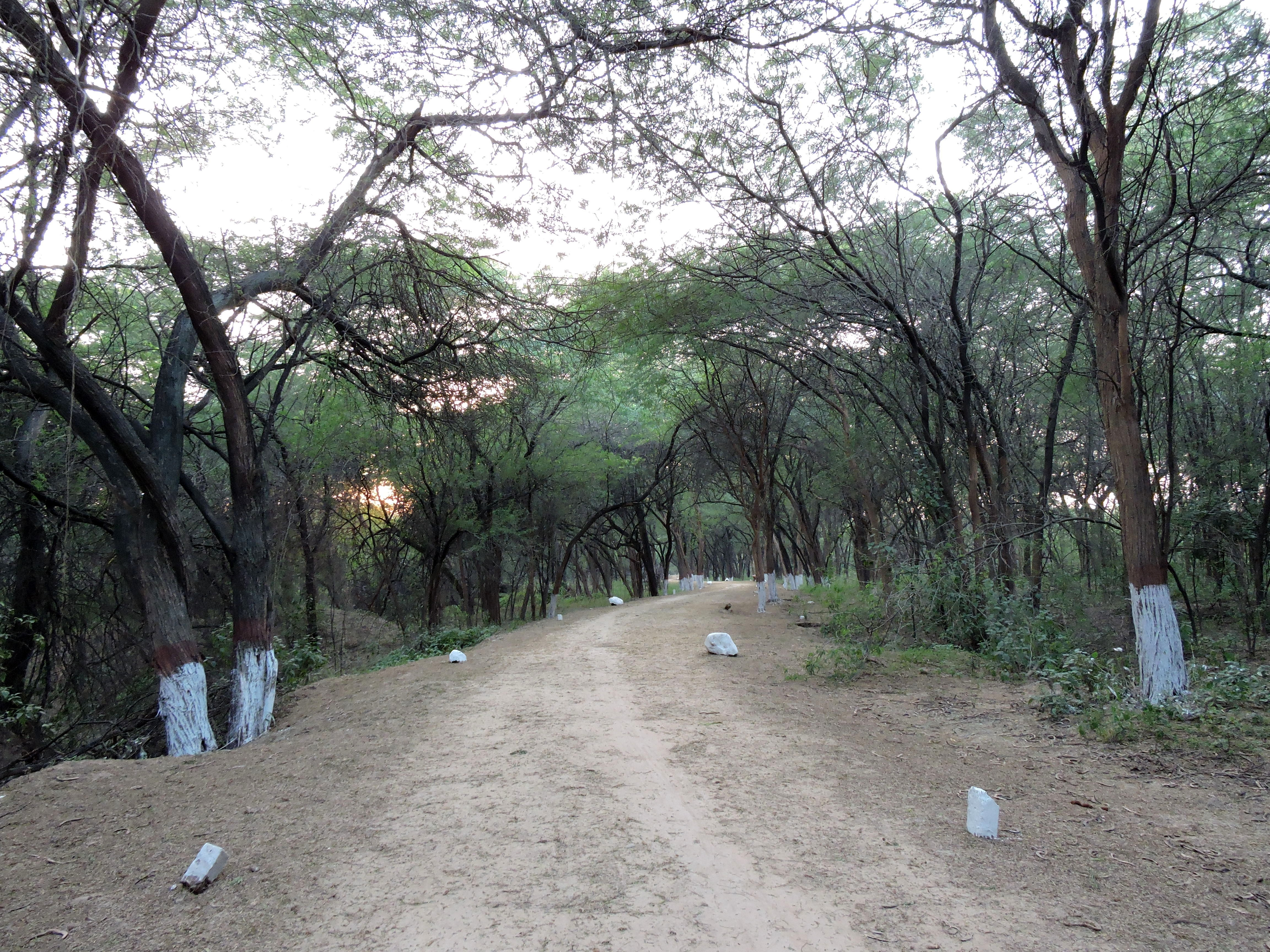

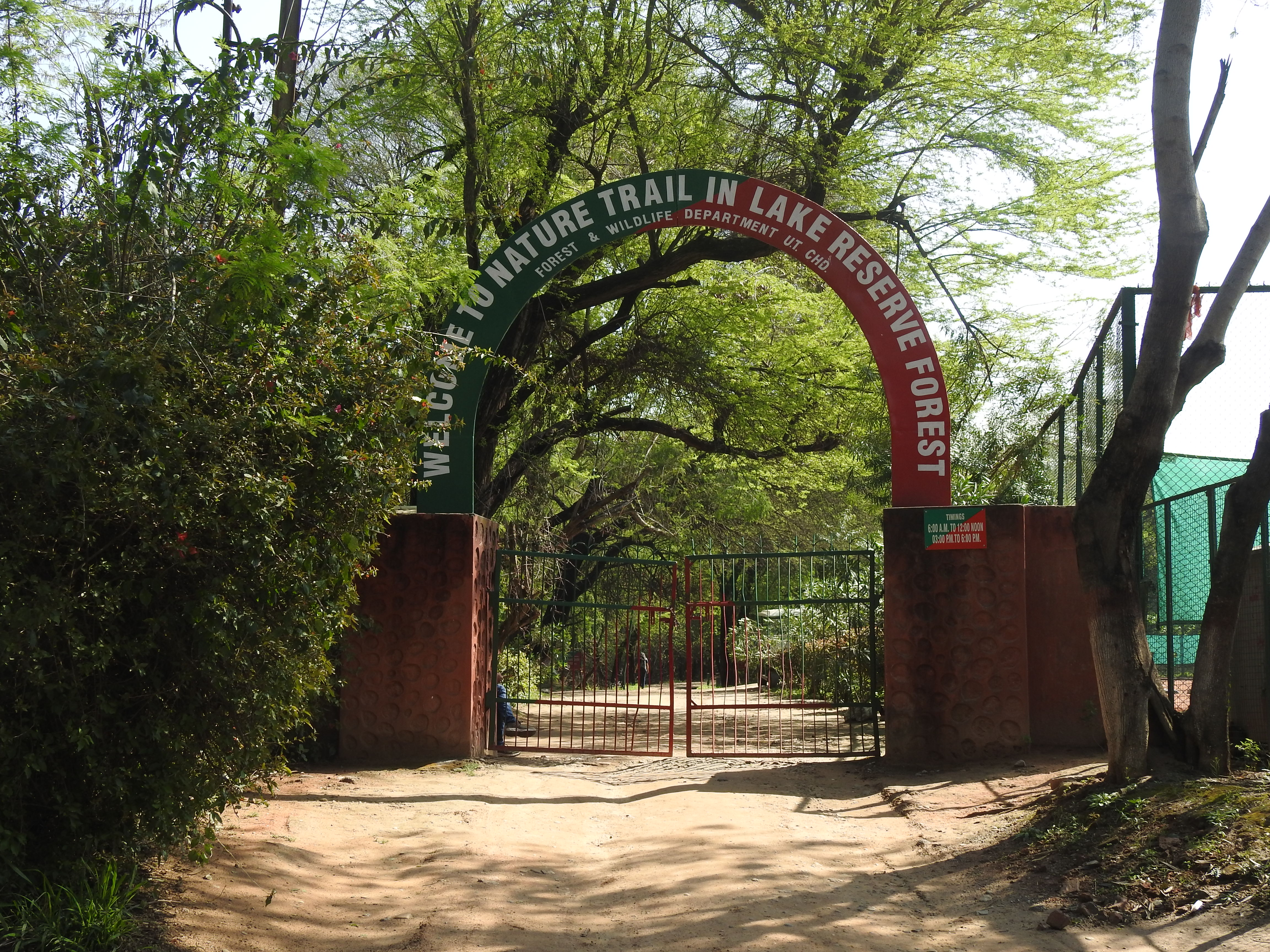
Entrance Nature Trail, Lake forest

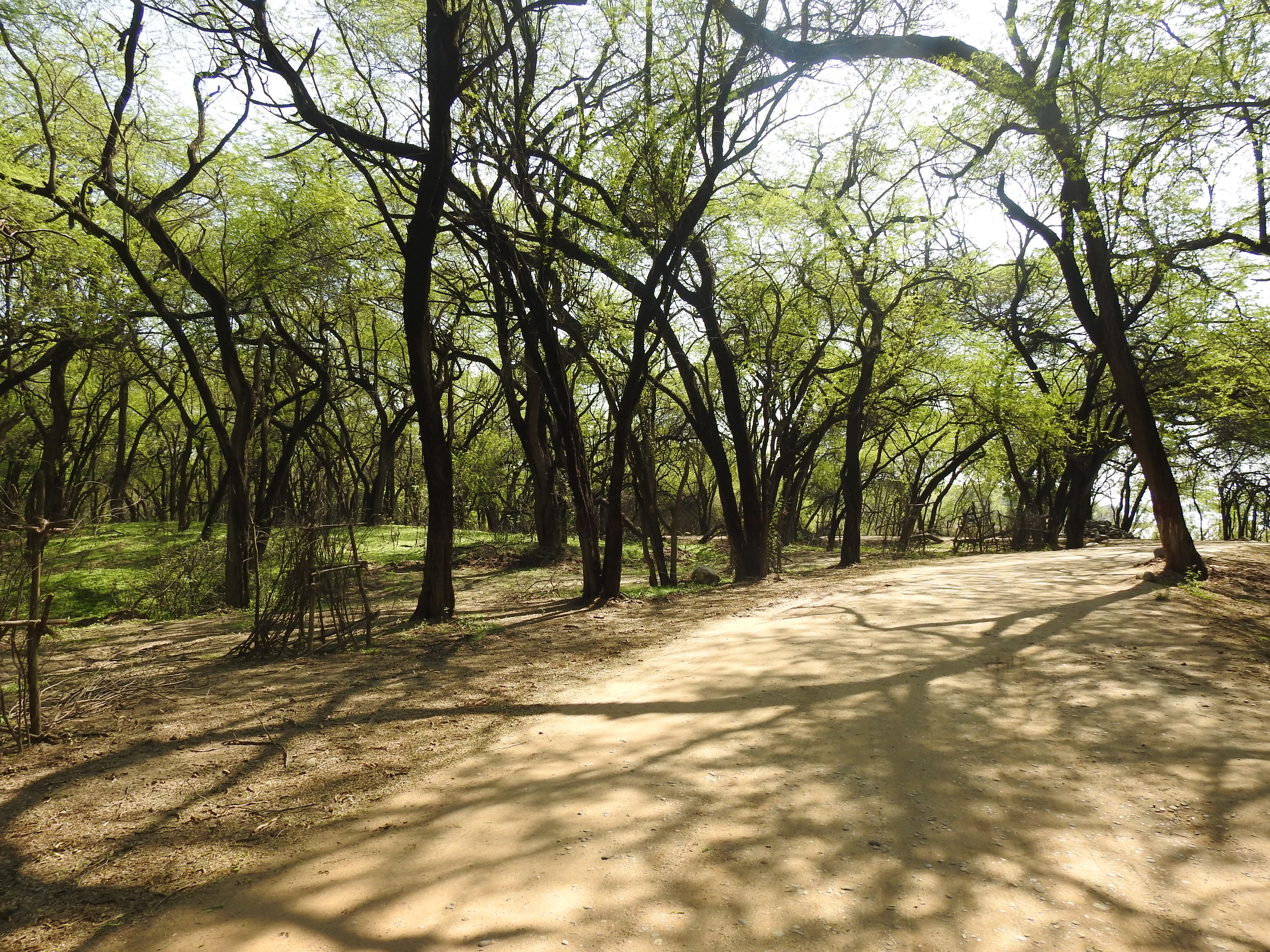
Inner view of Nature Trail, Lake forest

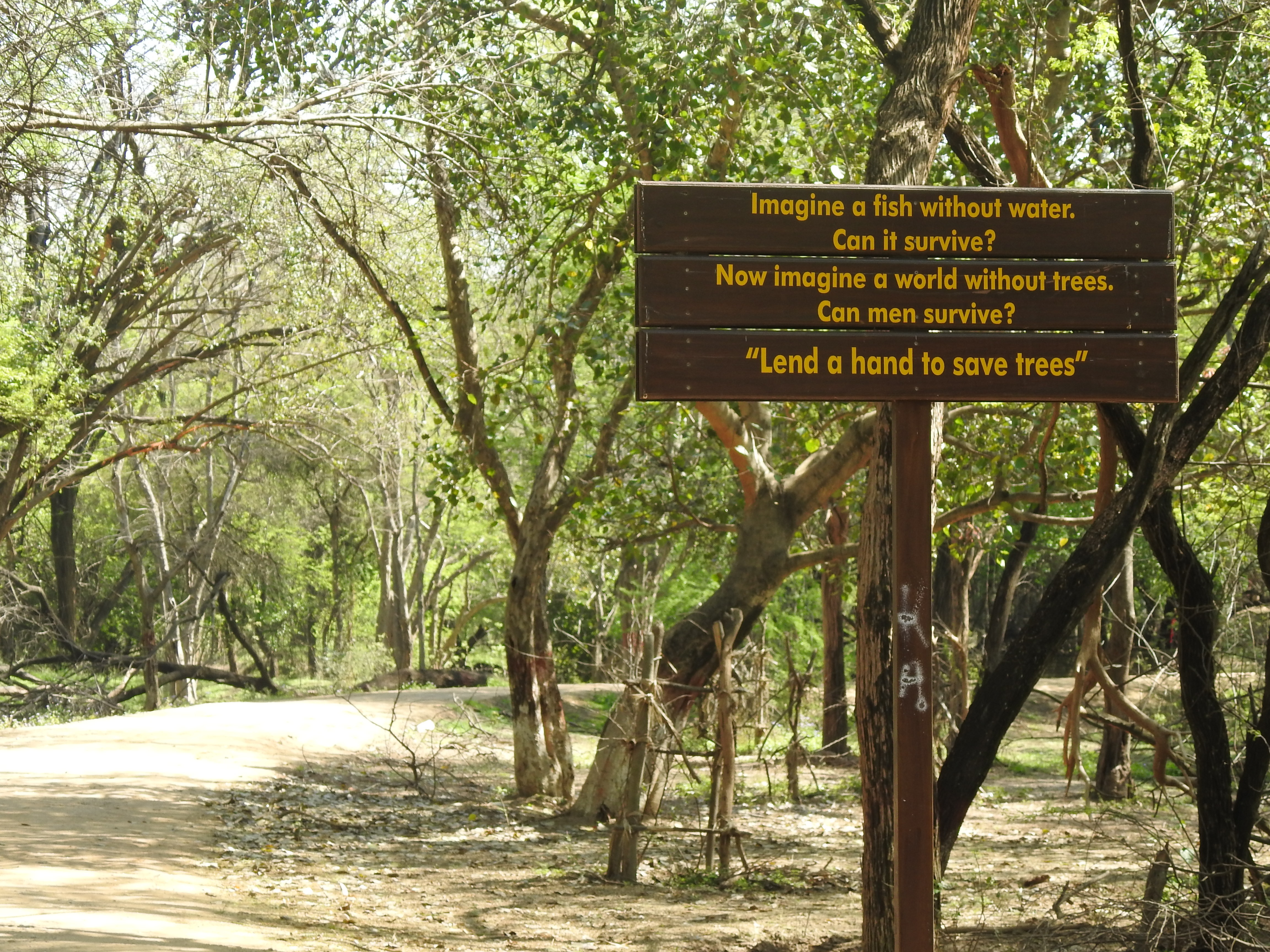
Pro nature slogan/ motos written in Nature Trail, Lake forest

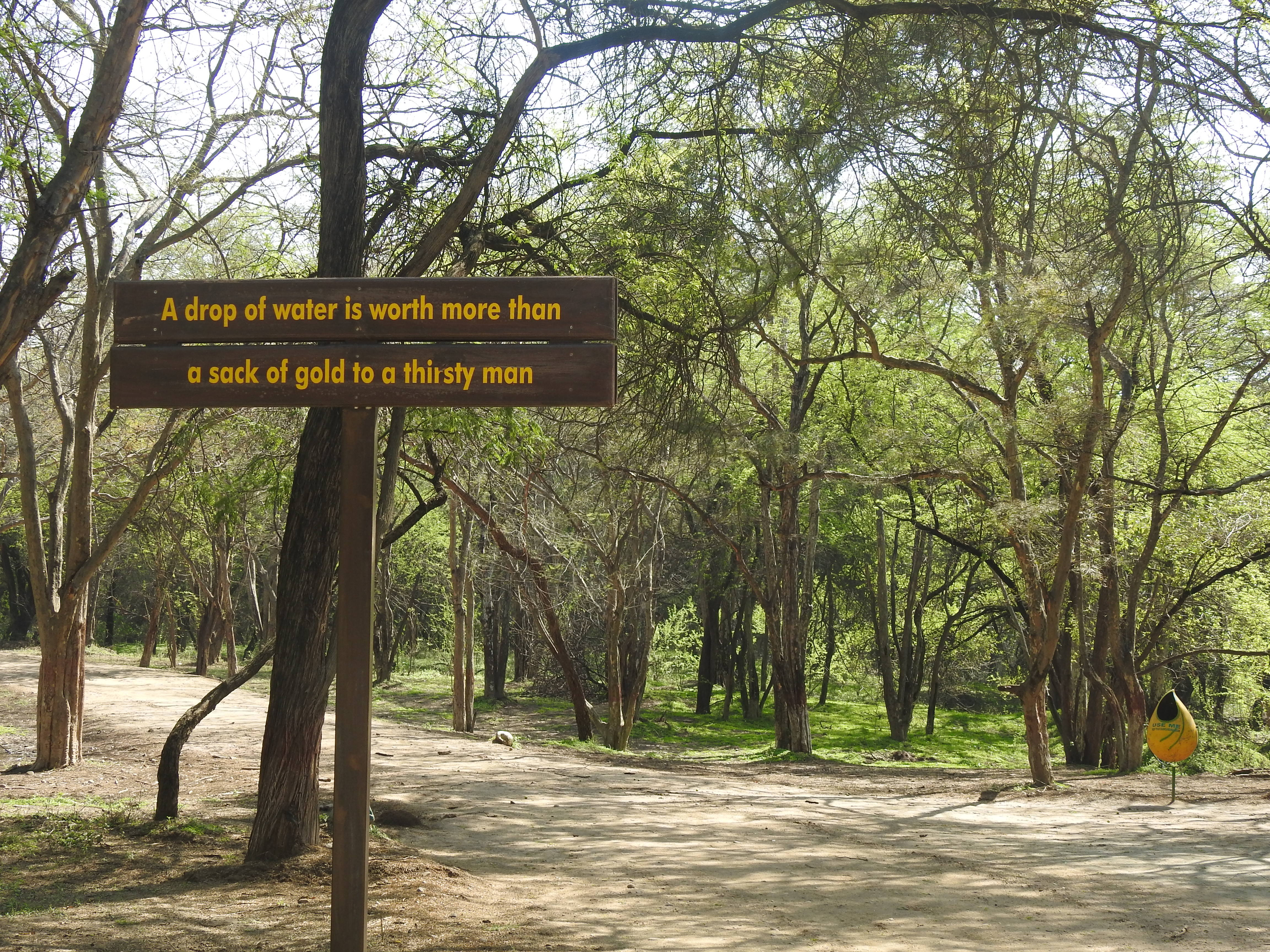
Pro Nature motos, Nature Trail

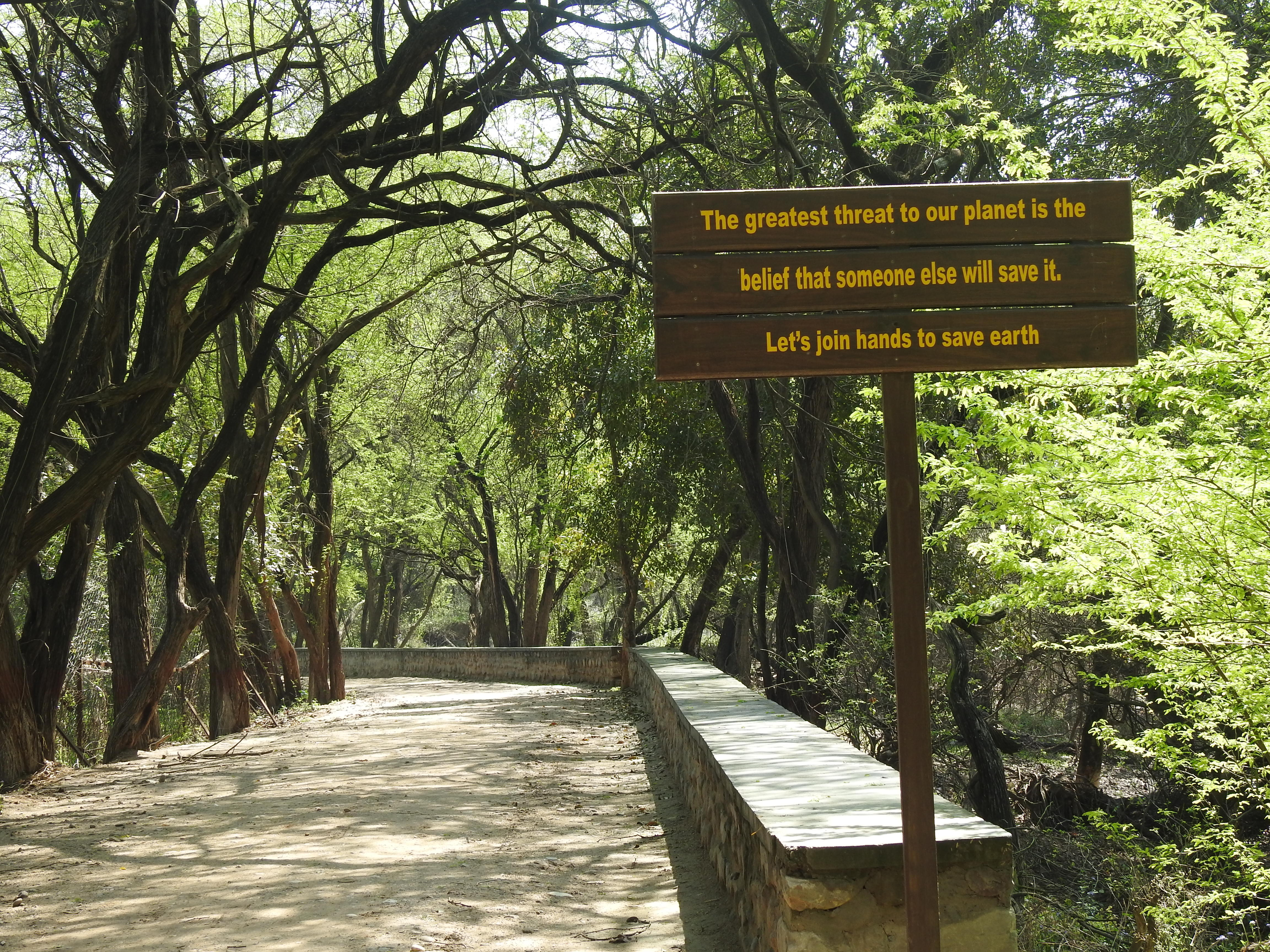
Pro Nature motos in Nature Trail

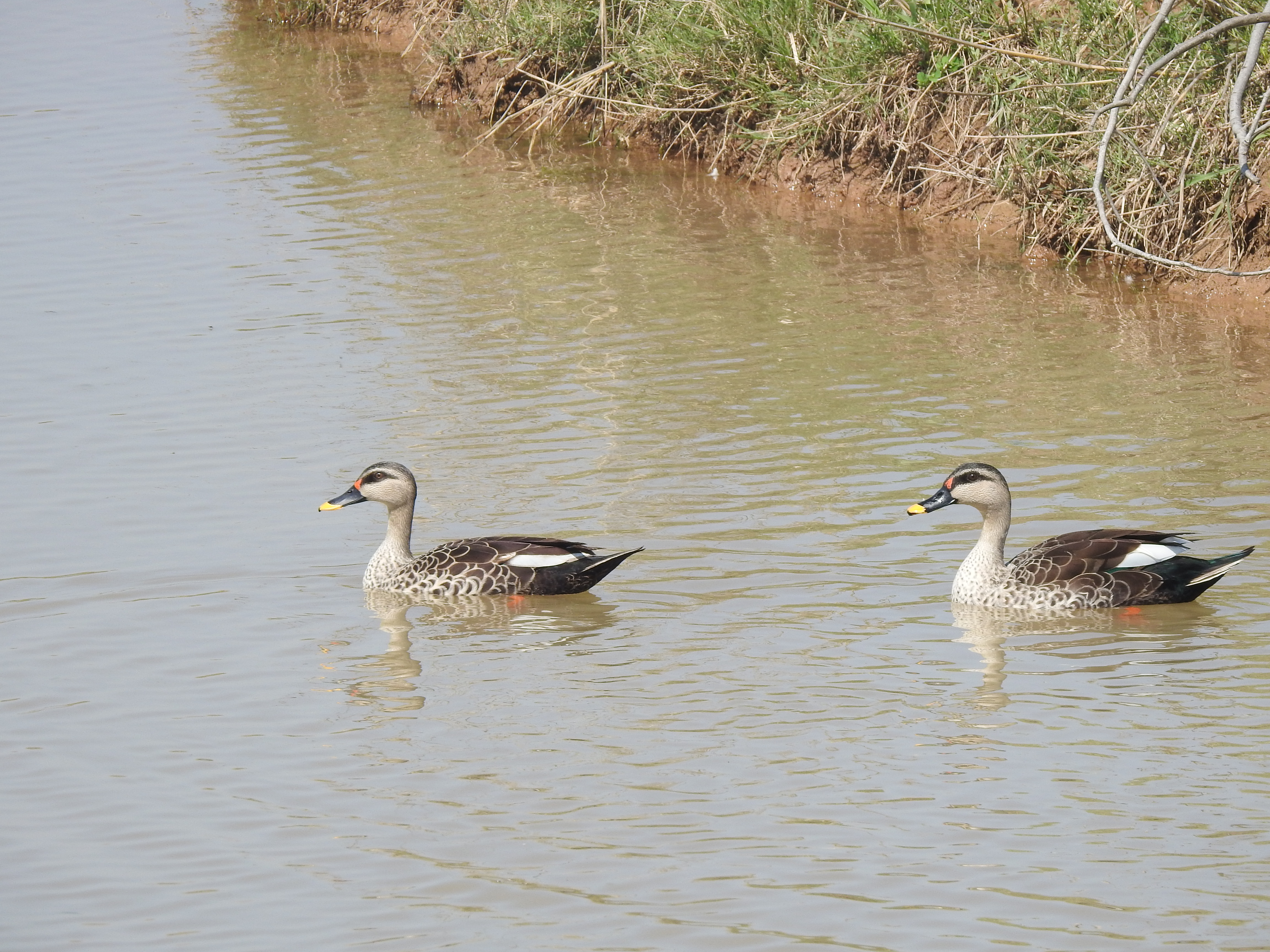
Nature Trail Reserve Forest, Sukhna Lake

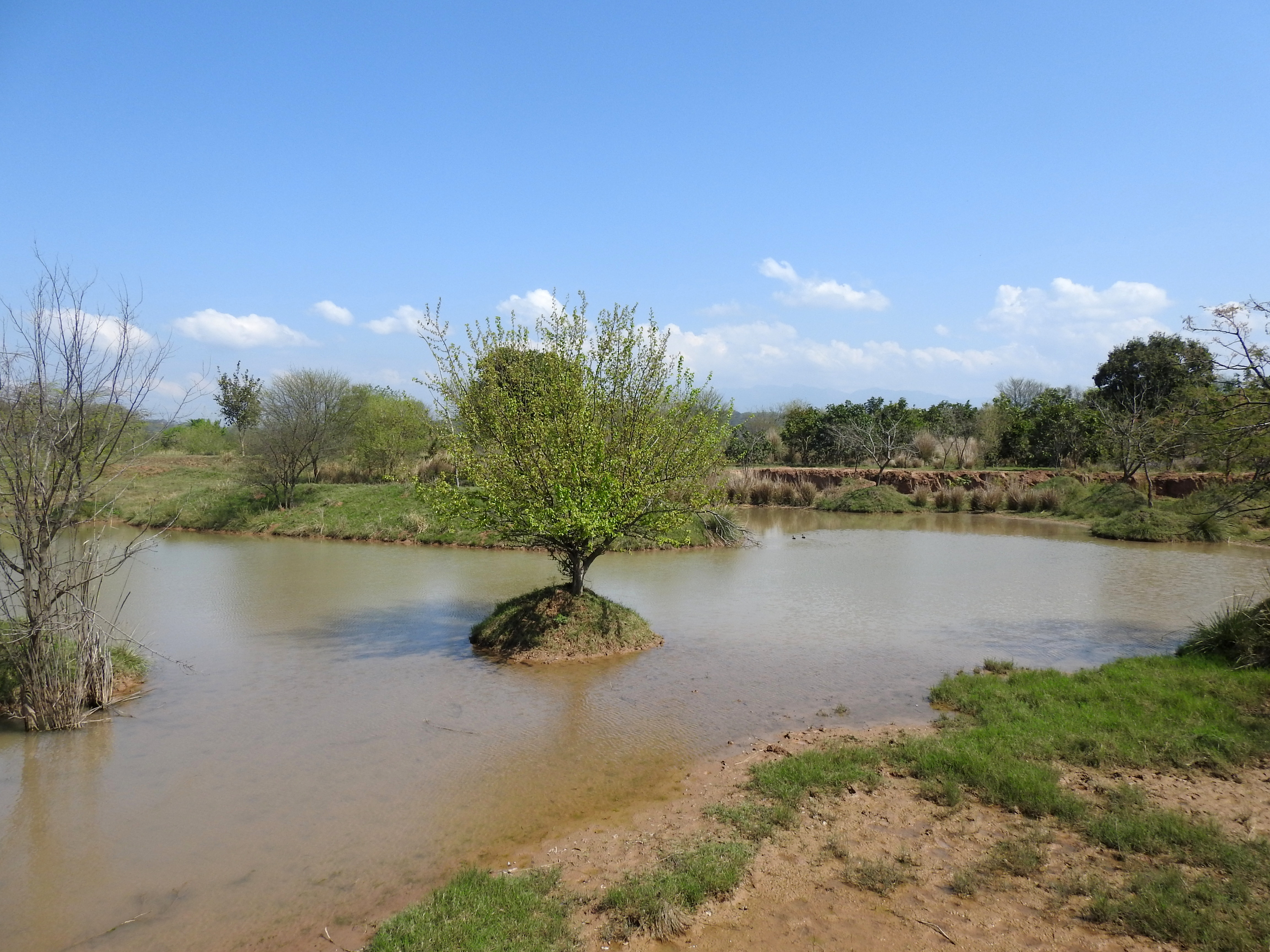
Landscape in Nature Trail reserve forest

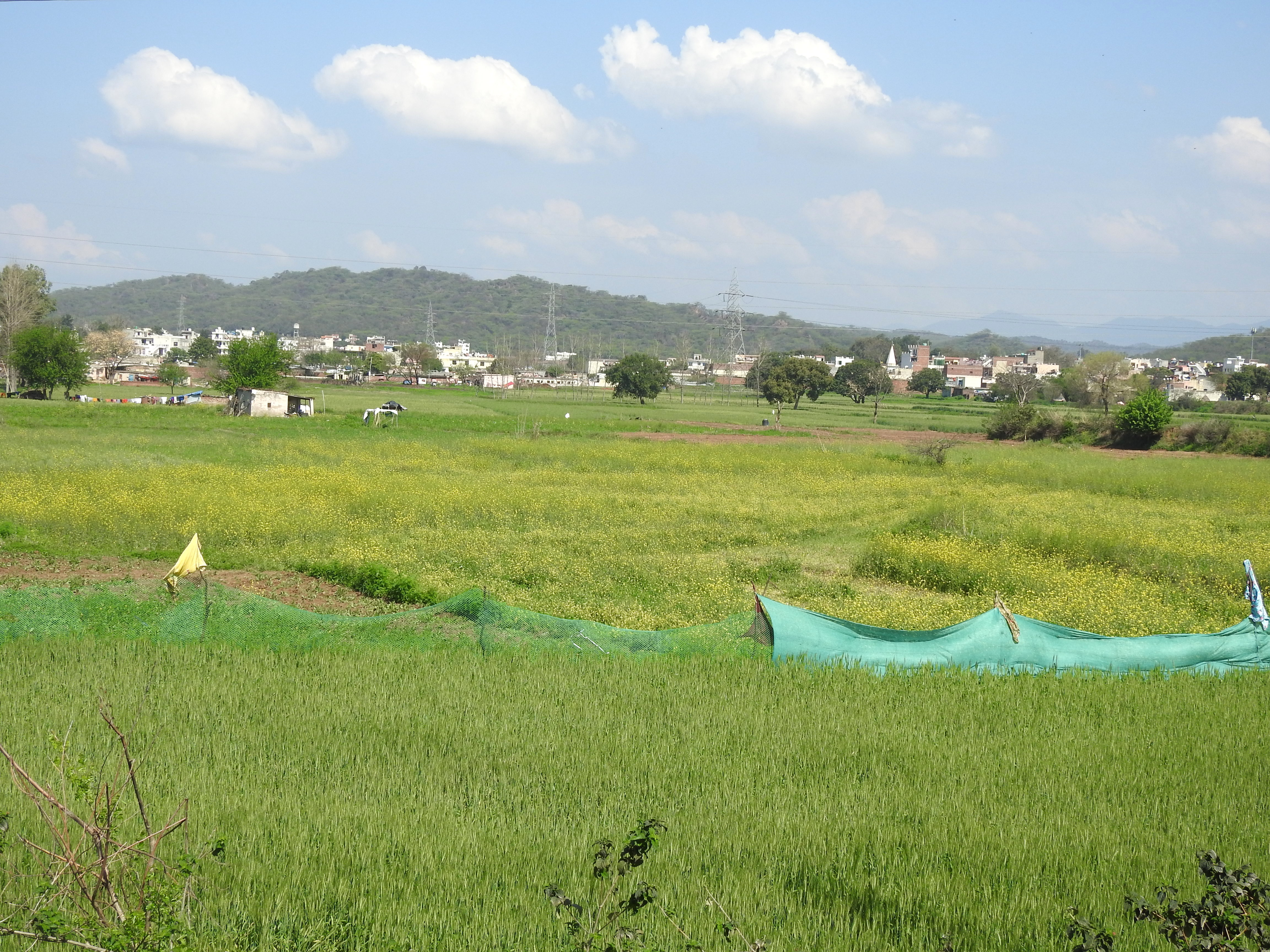
Landscape in and around Nature Trail reserve forest
