= Auto-mutation system in Chandigarh =

Automated property mutation system of the Chandigarh Estate Office, India

Overview
- Type: E-governance property mutation system
- Jurisdiction: Estate Office, UT Chandigarh
- Launched: 7 July 2025
- Operator: Chandigarh Administration
- Key official: Nishant Kumar Yadav, IAS (Deputy Commissioner-cum-Estate Officer)
- Status: Active
- Processing time: 2–7 days from deed registration

The auto-mutation system in Chandigarh is an e-governance reform introduced by the Estate Office of the Chandigarh Administration, India, that automatically updates property ownership records following the registration of a property deed, without requiring a separate mutation application from the buyer. The system became operational on 7 July 2025 and applies to immovable properties under the jurisdiction of the Estate Office, UT Chandigarh.

== Background ==
Mutation is the process of recording a change of ownership in official property records after a transfer. Before the reform, property buyers in Chandigarh had to file a separate mutation application at the Estate Office and make repeated visits, with no fixed timeframe for completion. According to the administration, more than half of the visitors to the Estate Office were applicants seeking property-transfer mutations through the manual system, which officials and residents described as slow and prone to favouritism.

== System ==
Under the auto-mutation system, mutation is initiated automatically once a property deed is registered, removing the need for a separate application by the transferee. The mechanism relies on real-time digital integration between the Sub-Registrar Office (SRO) and the Estate Office: upon successful registration of a deed, the relevant data and documents are securely transmitted to the Estate Office portal, triggering an automated workflow for mutation processing.

Key features described by the administration include:

- No manual application – mutation is triggered by deed registration rather than a separate request.
- Real-time integration – secure data transfer between the SRO and the Estate Office through a digitally integrated platform.
- Tracked workflow – each stage is digitally monitored with defined responsibilities and automatic acknowledgements to the applicant.
- Document reuse – documents submitted during deed registration are auto-fetched and reused, avoiding duplication.

A timeframe of one week from the date of property registration was fixed for completing the auto-mutation, after which the updated ownership records are reflected on the Estate Office's online portal. The system applies to all categories of immovable property—including freehold and leasehold—where ownership has been transferred via a registered deed. It is applied prospectively from the date of implementation, while older cases continue under the manual mutation process.

== Reception ==
Soon after launch, The Tribune reported that the system had cut red tape and reduced the wait previously involved in obtaining mutations. Residents cited in the report said their properties were mutated within four to five days of deed registration, with mutation certificates received without further visits to the Estate Office. Nishant Kumar Yadav, the Deputy Commissioner-cum-Estate Officer, described the system as a technology-driven step that made the mutation process streamlined, time-bound and accountable with minimal effort from the public.

== See also ==
- Digital India
- E-governance
- Land registration
