= Administration of Chandigarh =

Governing body of the Indian union territory of Chandigarh

Chandigarh Administration
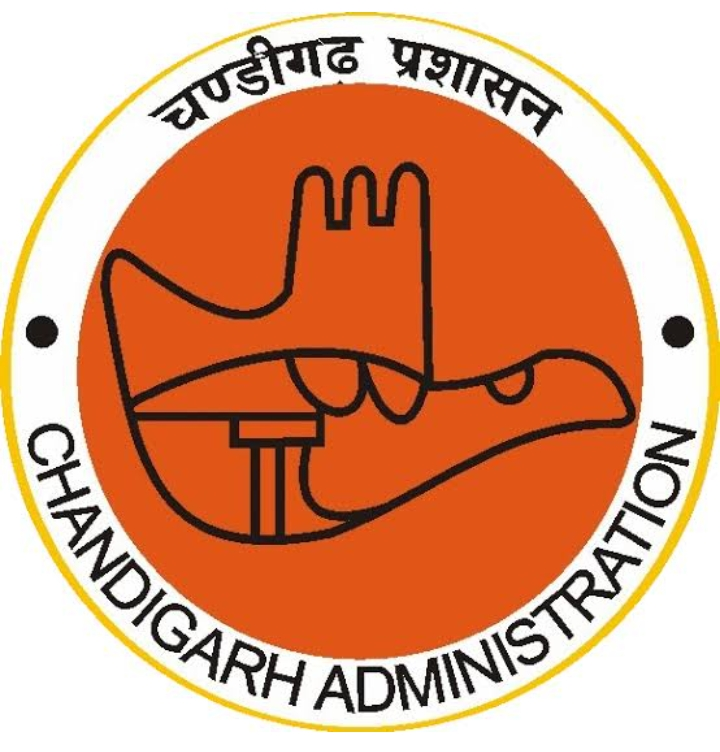
- Emblem of Chandigarh

Agency overview
- Formed: 1 November 1966; 59 years ago
- Jurisdiction: Chandigarh
- Headquarters: Union Territory Secretariat, Sector 9, Chandigarh
- Agency executives: Gulab Chand Kataria, Administrator; H. Rajesh Prasad, IAS, Chief Secretary
- Parent agency: Ministry of Home Affairs, Government of India
- Website: chandigarh.gov.in

The Chandigarh Administration is the governing body of the union territory of Chandigarh, India. As a union territory without a legislative assembly, Chandigarh is administered directly by the Government of India through the Ministry of Home Affairs, under Article 239 of the Constitution of India. The territory is headed by an Administrator, a role held by the Governor of Punjab, with the day-to-day functioning of the administration carried out by a Chief Secretary and a body of civil servants drawn largely from the Indian Administrative Service.

== Background ==
Chandigarh was conceived in the early 1950s as the planned capital of the Indian Punjab, with the master plan prepared by the Swiss-French architect Le Corbusier. Following the reorganisation of Punjab under the Punjab Reorganisation Act, 1966, Chandigarh was constituted as a union territory on 1 November 1966 and made the shared capital of the newly created states of Punjab and Haryana. The territory covers an area of about 114 square kilometres and recorded a population of 1,055,450 in the 2011 Census of India.

== Administrative head ==
=== Administrator ===
The Administrator of Chandigarh is appointed by the President of India under Article 239 of the Constitution. Since 1984, the office has been held ex officio by the Governor of Punjab. Gulab Chand Kataria, a veteran of the Bharatiya Janata Party, was sworn in as Governor of Punjab and Administrator of Chandigarh on 31 July 2024, succeeding Banwarilal Purohit.

=== Chief Secretary ===
For several decades the senior-most civil servant in the territory was designated the Adviser to the Administrator, an Indian Administrative Service officer of the AGMUT cadre appointed by the Ministry of Home Affairs. In January 2025 the Ministry of Home Affairs restructured the top administrative hierarchy, abolishing the post of Adviser and creating the post of Chief Secretary; Rajeev Verma, a 1992-batch officer who had previously served as Adviser, became the territory's first Chief Secretary.

On 8 October 2025, H. Rajesh Prasad, a 1995-batch IAS officer of the AGMUT cadre, took charge as Chief Secretary of Chandigarh after his appointment by the Ministry of Home Affairs, succeeding Rajeev Verma, who had moved to Delhi as that city's Chief Secretary. The Chief Secretary advises the Administrator on policy and oversees the day-to-day administration of the territory, and the financial powers of the Administrator stand delegated to that office.

== Cadre composition ==
Senior administrative posts in Chandigarh are filled by officers drawn from the AGMUT cadre as well as the Punjab and Haryana cadres of the all-India services. Following instructions issued by the Ministry of Home Affairs on 4 November 1996, in line with the Punjab Reorganisation Act, a ratio of 60:40 is maintained between Punjab and Haryana for the filling of posts in the territory. The balance between the AGMUT, Punjab and Haryana cadres has periodically been a subject of political contention, with the governments of Punjab and Haryana raising concerns about their respective shares in the administration.

== Departments and functions ==
The administration discharges the functions ordinarily carried out by a state government, organised into departments covering subjects such as finance, home, personnel, education, health, transport, town and country planning, and estate management. Heads of department, secretaries and deputy commissioners report through the Chief Secretary to the Administrator. The administration also operates an online portal for citizen services and recruitment, and issues recruitment notifications for posts in its common cadre.

== Local government ==
Civic administration within the city is the responsibility of the Chandigarh Municipal Corporation, the elected local body established in 1994, which functions alongside the union territory administration. Judicial functions for the territory are exercised by the Punjab and Haryana High Court, which is the common high court for Punjab, Haryana and Chandigarh.

== See also ==
- Chandigarh
- Government of Chandigarh
- List of administrators of Chandigarh
- Chandigarh Municipal Corporation
- Punjab Reorganisation Act, 1966
