= Nek Chand =

Indian artist, known for building the Rock Garden of Chandigarh

Nek Chand Saini
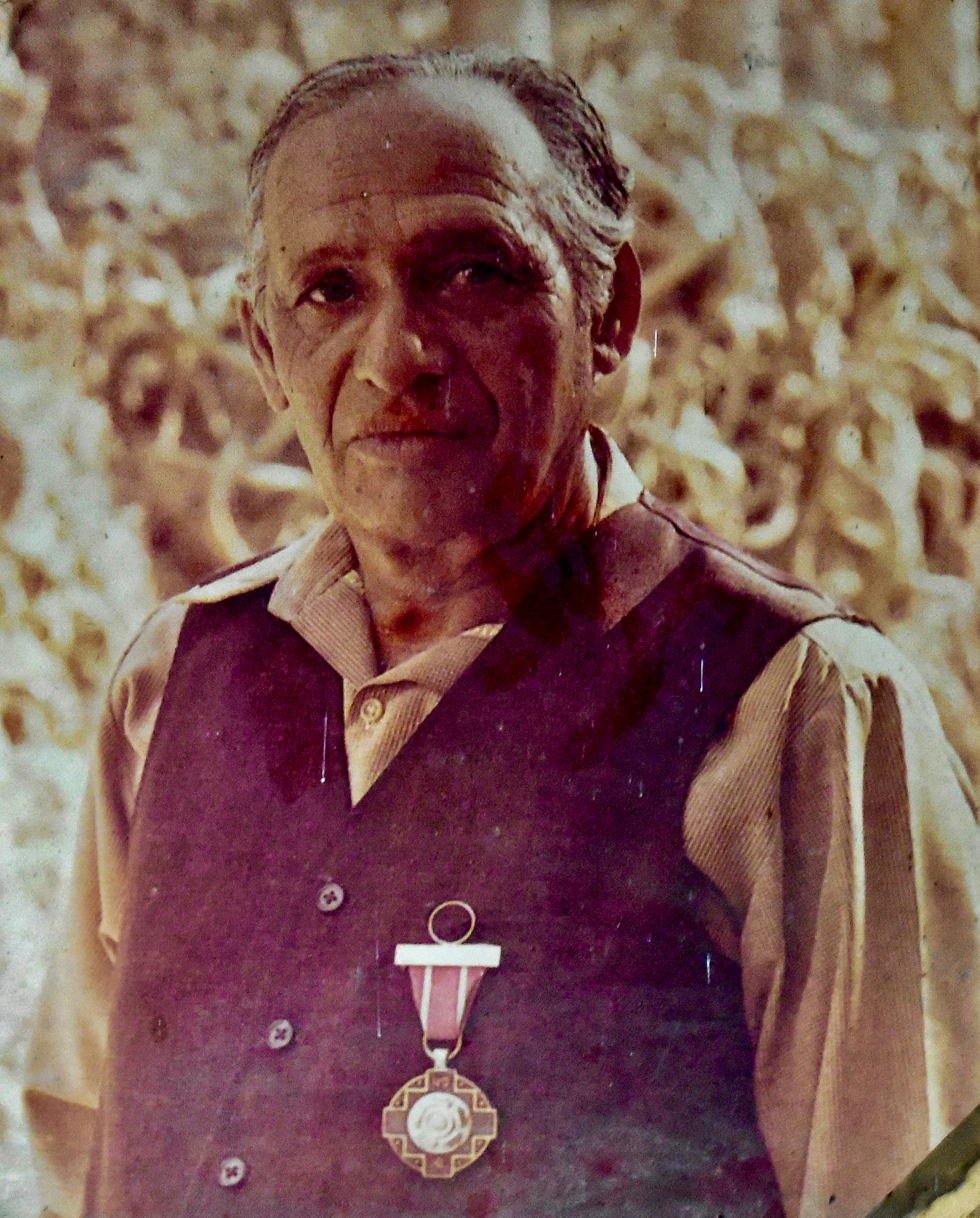
- Nek Chand with his Padma Shri in 1988
- Born: 15 December 1924; Barian Kalan, Shakargarh (pre-partition Gurdaspur district), British Indian Empire (now in Pakistan)
- Died: 12 June 2015 (aged 90); Chandigarh, India
- Known for: Architecture, sculpture
- Notable work: The Rock Garden of Chandigarh
- Movement: Outsider art
- Awards: Padma Shri (1984)

Nek Chand Saini (15 December 1924 – 12 June 2015) was a self-taught Indian artist, known for building the Rock Garden of Chandigarh, an eighteen-acre sculpture garden in the city of Chandigarh.

== Early life and background ==
Nek Chand hailed from Shakargarh tehsil. Shakargarh was previously in Gurdaspur district in British India, but now falls in district Narowal in Pakistan. His family moved to India in 1947 during the Partition. They moved to Chandigarh in 1955. At the time, the city was being redesigned as a modern utopia by the Swiss/French architect Le Corbusier. It was to be the first planned city in India, and Chand found work there as a roads inspector for the Public Works Department in 1951.

He was awarded the Padma Shri by Government of India in 1984. He died in 2015.

The Rock Garden is one of the most famous sites in India. Chand, its creator, died in 2015, but it is still visited by millions of people every year.

In his spare time, Nek Chand collected materials from demolition sites around the city. He recycled these materials into his own vision of the divine kingdom of Sukrani, New Delhi choosing a gorge in a forest near Sukhna Lake for his work. The gorge had been designated as a land conservancy, a forest buffer established in 1902 that nothing could be built on. Chand's work was illegal, but he was able to hide it for eighteen years before it was discovered by the authorities in 1975. By this time, it had grown into a 13-acre (5.3 ha) complex of interlinked courtyards, each filled with hundreds of pottery-covered concrete sculptures of dancers, musicians, and animals. Chand built up the mass with a cement and sand mix made from recycled materials before adding a final coating of smoothly burnished pure cement combined with waste materials such as broken glass, bangles, crockery, mosaic, and iron-foundry slag.

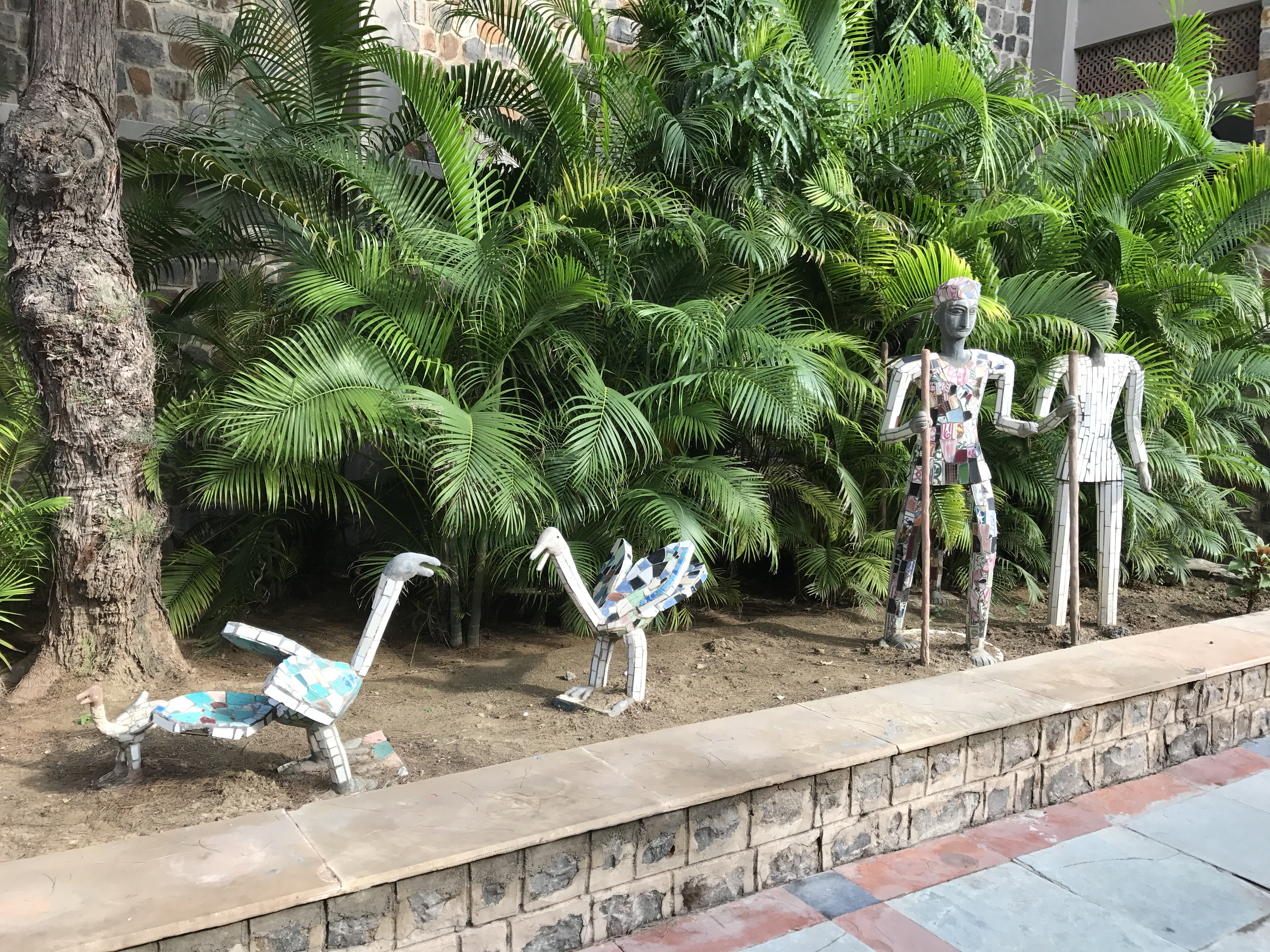
Nek Chand sculptures at the AES campus in New Delhi.

His work was in serious danger of being demolished, but he was able to get public opinion on his side, and in 1986 the park was inaugurated as a public space. Chand was given a salary, a title ("Sub-Divisional Engineer, Rock Garden"), and a workforce of 50 laborers so that he could concentrate full-time on his work. It even appeared on an Indian stamp in 1983. The Rock Garden is still made out of recycled materials; and with the government's help, Chand was able to set up collection centers around the city for waste, especially rags and broken ceramics.

When Chand left the country on a lecture tour in 1996, the city withdrew its funding, and vandals attacked the park. The Rock Garden Society took over the administration and upkeep of this environment. The garden is visited by over five thousand people daily.

== Exhibitions ==
Chand's statues have found their way into museums across the world, including an environment at the Capitol Children's Museum in Washington, D.C., the American Folk Art Museum in New York City and the main entrance to the Collection de l'art brut in Lausanne, Switzerland. The John Michael Kohler Arts Center in Wisconsin, USA owns the largest collection of Chand's work outside of Chandigarh. The pieces were on exhibition there from June 2007 to January 2008 as part of the museum's focus on artist environment builders, or outsider artists.

An exhibition of Chand's work also took place at the Royal Institute of British Architects (RIBA) gallery in Liverpool, England from 16 April to 11 May 2007. The exhibition displayed survey drawings of the garden's architecture and landscaping, and plans to be a travelling exhibition.

Numerous Nek Chand sculptures are also displayed in the gardens and on the walkways of the campus of the American Embassy School in New Delhi.

There is a Nek Chand Foundation in London founded to raise funds for the garden.

== See also ==
- Rock Garden, Darjeeling
