= Rock Garden, Darjeeling =

Rock garden in Darjeeling, India

Darjeeling Rock Garden
- Barbotey Rock Garden
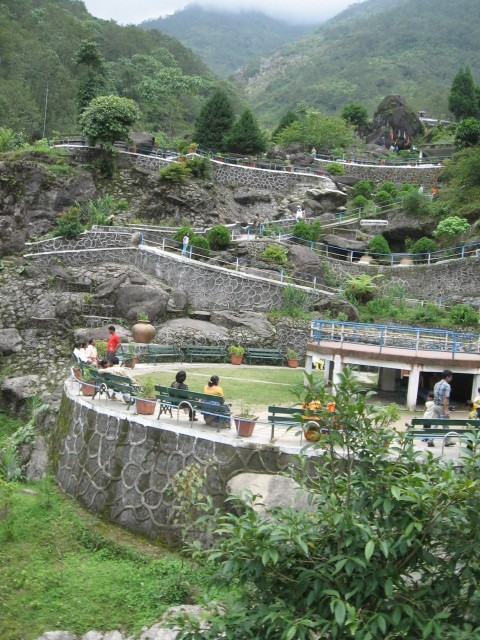
- The terraced garden
- Interactive map of Darjeeling Rock Garden
- Location: Darjeeling district, West Bengal, India
- Coordinates: 27.0254°N 88.2380°E

The Rock Garden (also known as Barbotey Rock Garden) at Chunnu Summer Falls and Ganga Maya Park are recently added tourist attractions in the hilly town of Darjeeling in the state of West Bengal, India. It is a tourist attraction meant to attract people to Darjeeling after political agitations disrupted tourism in the 1980s. There is another rock garden in Darjeeling known as Sir John Anderson Rock Garden, which is part of Lloyd's Botanical Garden.

== Background ==
The British secured Darjeeling from the Raja of Sikkim in 1835 and developed the area. They introduced tea gardens in the area. Townships sprang up, hotels were built and the population in the area grew rapidly. From 100 people in 1839, the population had shot up to 10,000 by 1849. Spread on hill slopes at an altitude of 2,134 metres (7,000 feet), the town and the area became a major tourist destination.

In the 1980s, the movement of the Gorkha National Liberation Front (GNLF) was in full swing in the Darjeeling Hills. The unrest affected the arrival of tourists and Darjeeling started losing out as a tourist destination. With the formation of Darjeeling Gorkha Autonomous Hill Council (DGAHC) in 1988, relative peace returned to the area. Since tea and tourism were the mainstays of the economy of the region, DGAHC initiated efforts to lure tourists back to Darjeeling. "We are now focusing on not only Darjeeling town as a tourist centre, but also the region outside it," D.T. Tamlong, principal secretary, DGAHC told Frontline.

== Geography ==
Places and tea estates in the north-western portion of Darjeeling Sadar subdivision (including Darjeeling Pulbazar CD block) in Darjeeling district
CT: census town, R: rural/ urban centre, N: neighbourhood, H: hill centre, NP: national park/ wildlife sanctuary, TE: tea estate, TA: tourist attraction
Abbreviations used in names – TG for Tea Garden (town/village), TE for Tea Estate
Owing to space constraints in the small map, the actual locations in a larger map may vary slightly

This map presents some of the notable locations in the subdivision. All places marked in the map are linked in the larger full-screen map.

=== Rock Garden ===
The garden is about 10 kilometres (6.2 mi) from Darjeeling. While proceeding from the town along Hill Cart Road, one has to turn right, well before reaching Ghum. The road descends rapidly into the valley. With sharp bends all the way, there are scenic views at many points. Tea gardens dot the hill slopes.

Constructed by the Gorkha Hill Council Tourism Department, it was inaugurated by Subhash Ghising, the GNLF supremo. The Rock Garden is a multi-level picnic ground terraced around a natural waterfall, its attraction is in it "being a sort of road-side facility but with a little too much concrete." The garden has views of a hill stream cascading over rocks along the slope, with flower gardens and sitting spaces at different levels. There is also a small lake. With tourists pouring in large numbers, tea shops and snack kiosks have come up.

== Ganga Maya Park ==
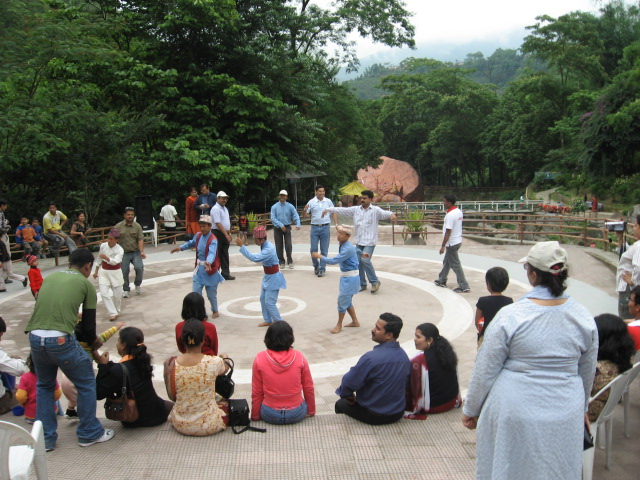
Tourists enjoying Gorkha folk dances at Ganga Maya Park

Ganga Maya Park is further down the road, about 3 kilometres (1.9 mi) from the Rock Garden. Named after an innocent victim of police firing during the GNLF agitation, "it meanders down the course of a chortling mountain stream, past gazebos, clumps of flowering shrubs and trees, over humped backed bridges under which koi-carp coruscate, and into a circular lake with paddle boats and a waterfall." It has a small lake where boating facilities are available. Gorkha folk dances are performed to entertain the tourists.

== Transport ==
Good road conditions are essential in the hills, not only for comfortable rides but also for safety. The poor maintenance of the roads often led to protests by transporters’ associations. Amongst the bad roads in focus is the one to Rock Garden and Ganga Maya Park. DGHC maintains a vast network of roads, and they are repairing stretches. Since it is difficult to get bitumen on time, repairs get delayed sometimes. It takes around 30 minutes from darjeeling to reach here and the roads are very steep and only a trained driver can drive in this stretch of road.

== In popular culture ==
Satyajit Ray’s Kanchenjungha (1962) helped the world discover the charm of Darjeeling. Raja Mukherjee’s directorial debut Bidhatar Khela (2007) renewed the magic of the town. Mukherjee, who had never been to Darjeeling before, was overwhelmed by the place and was surprised that the beauty of the hills has not been properly exposed to the world. After two trips to the town, he decided to capture every possible place here — from St Paul's School to Mount Hermon, from Hotel Viceroy, Ganga Maya Park, Rock Garden, Happy Valley to even Morgan's House in Kalimpong — in his movie.

== Gallery ==
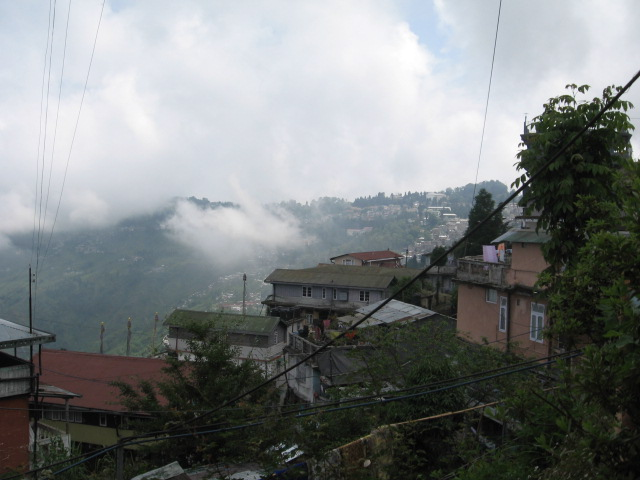
A view of Darjeeling from the road to Rock Garden

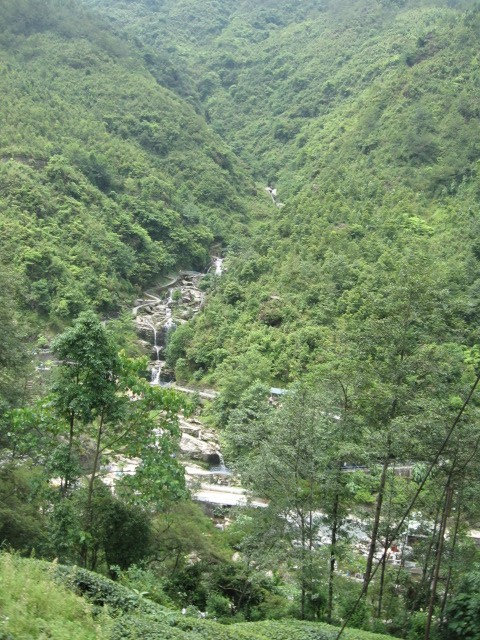
The first glimpse of the falls and garden

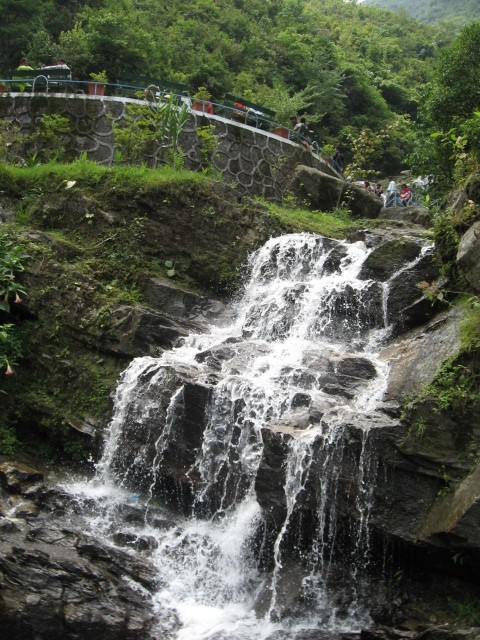
A portion of Chunnu Summer Falls

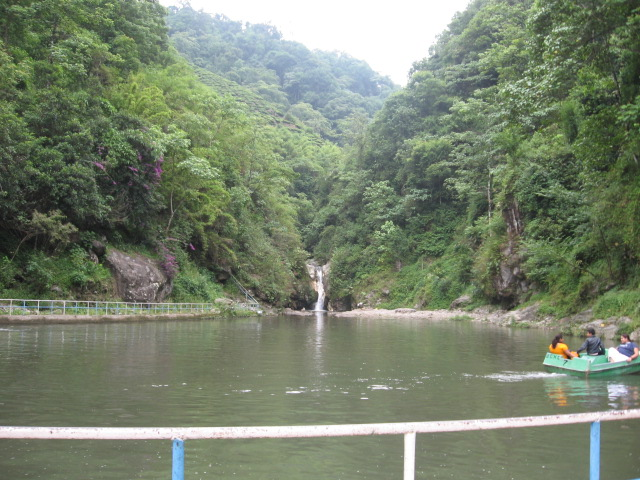
The lake at Ganga Maya Park

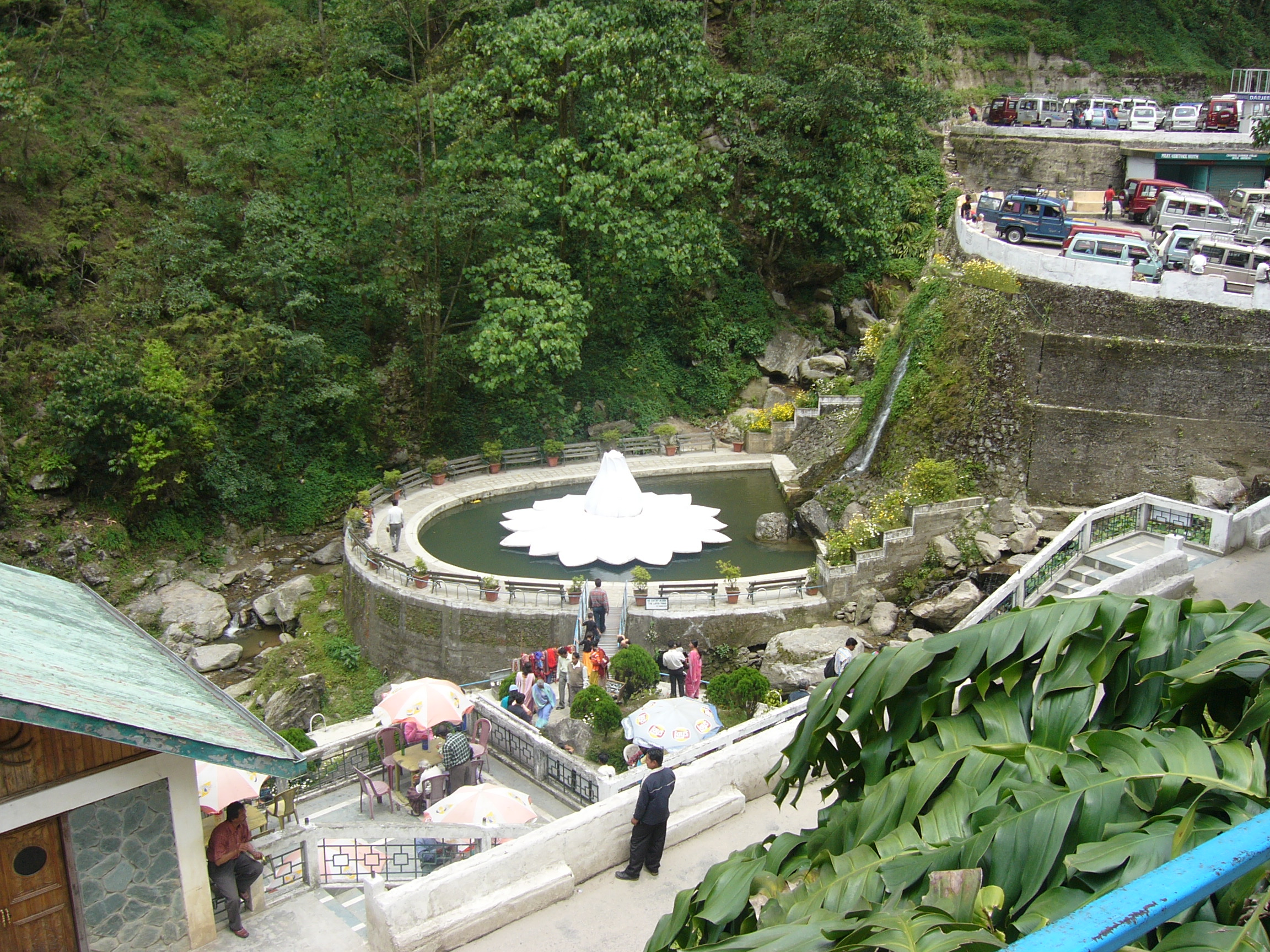
Rock Garden

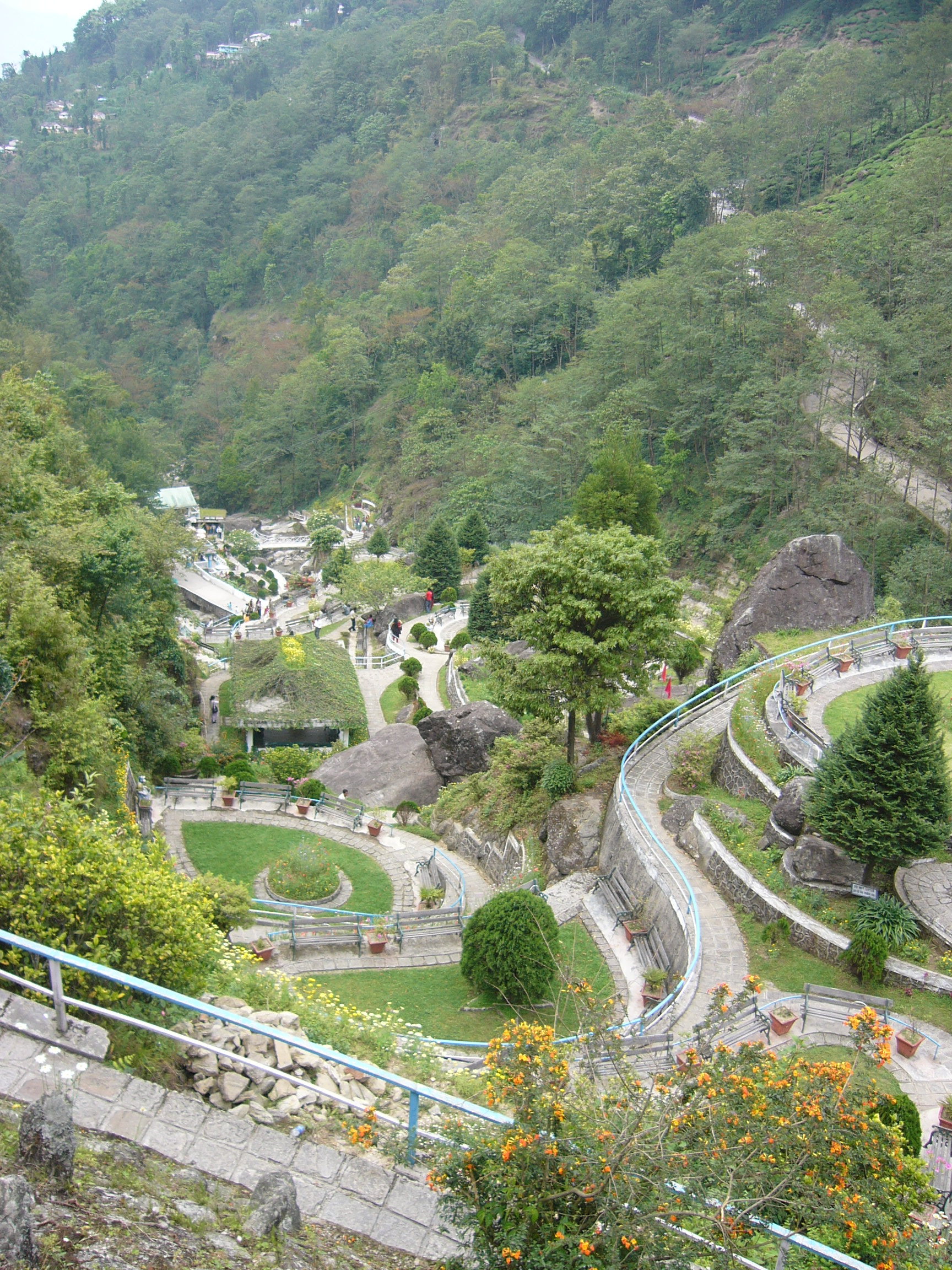
Rock Garden

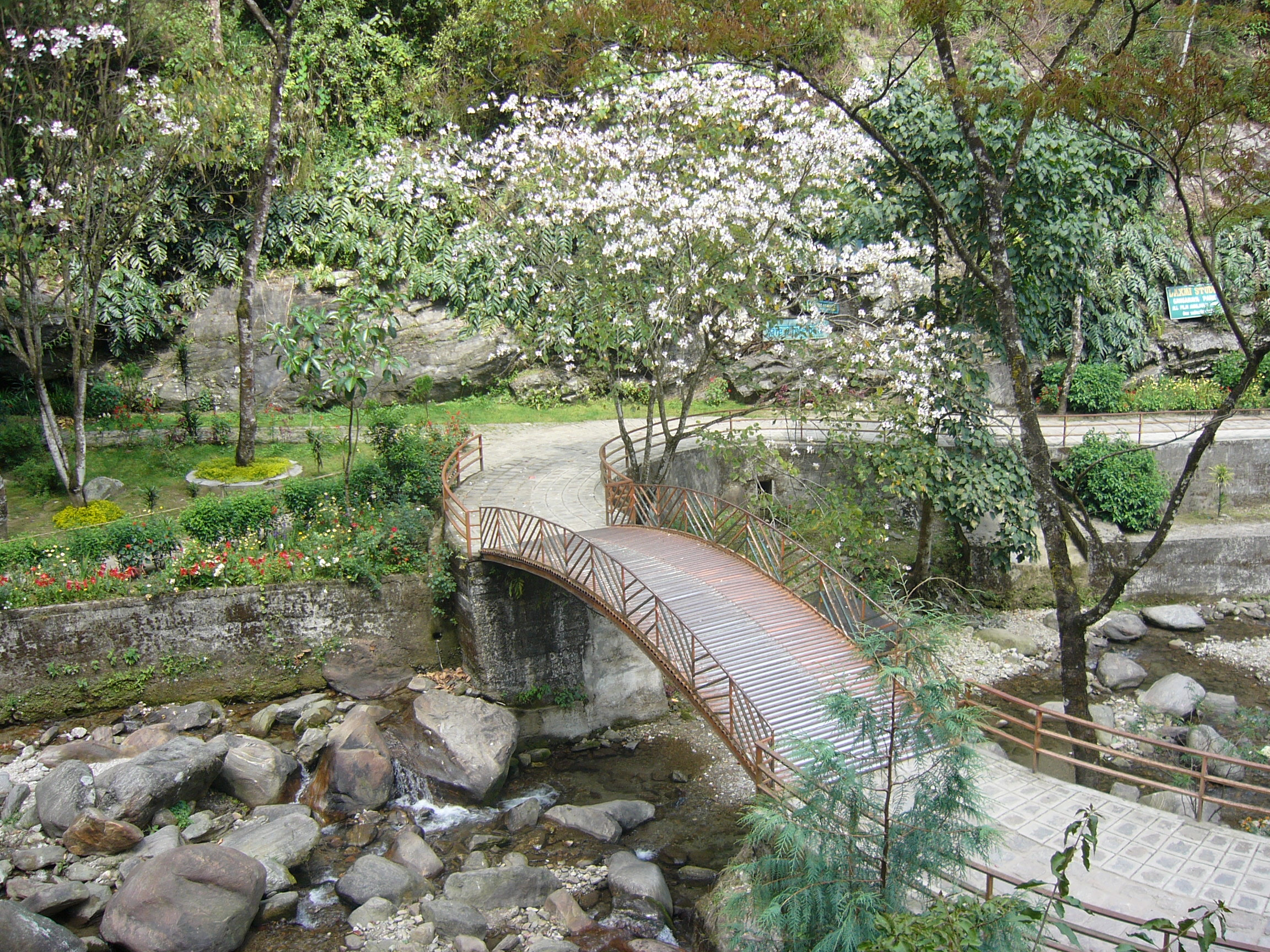
Gangamaya Park

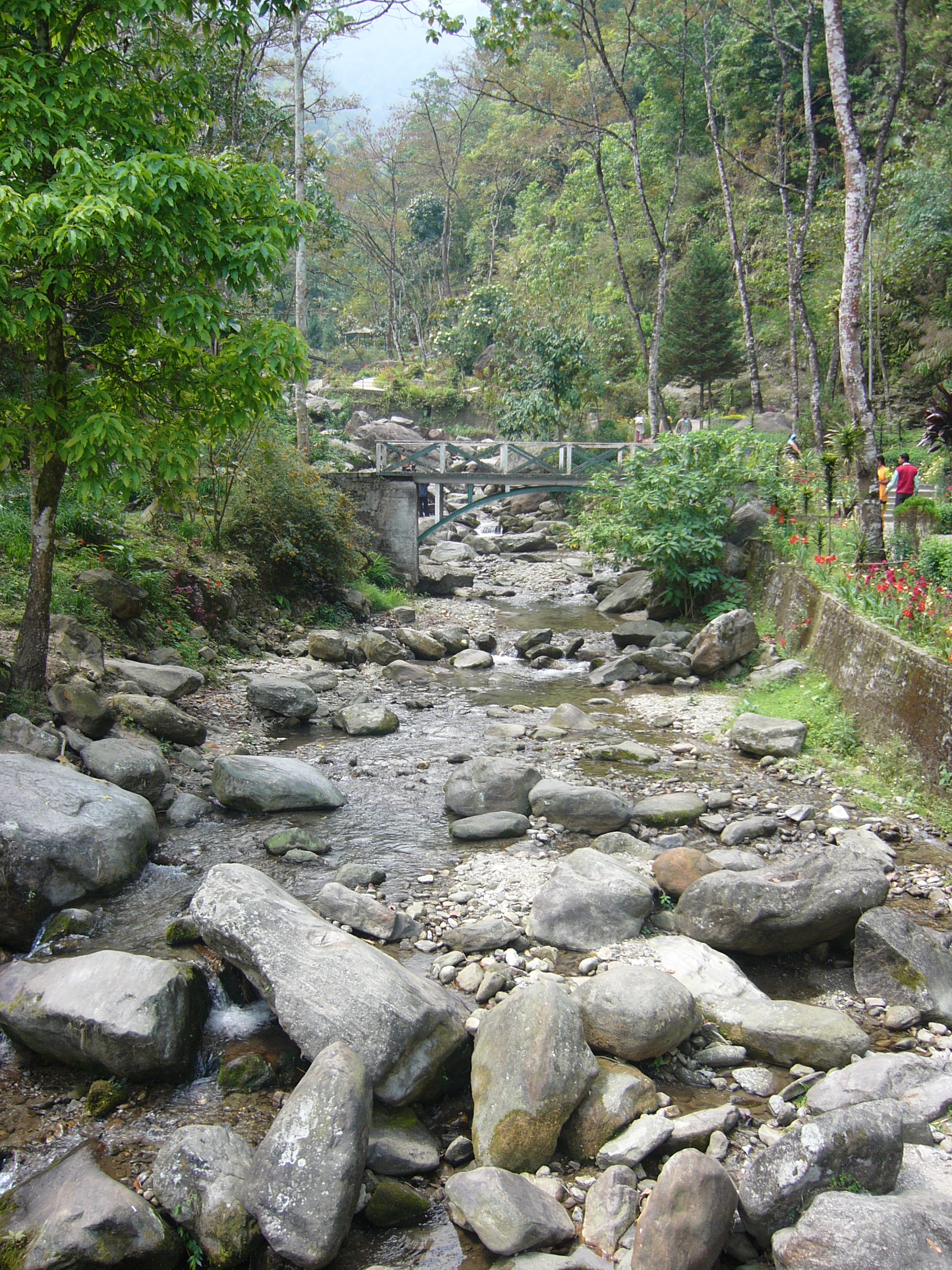
Gangamaya Park

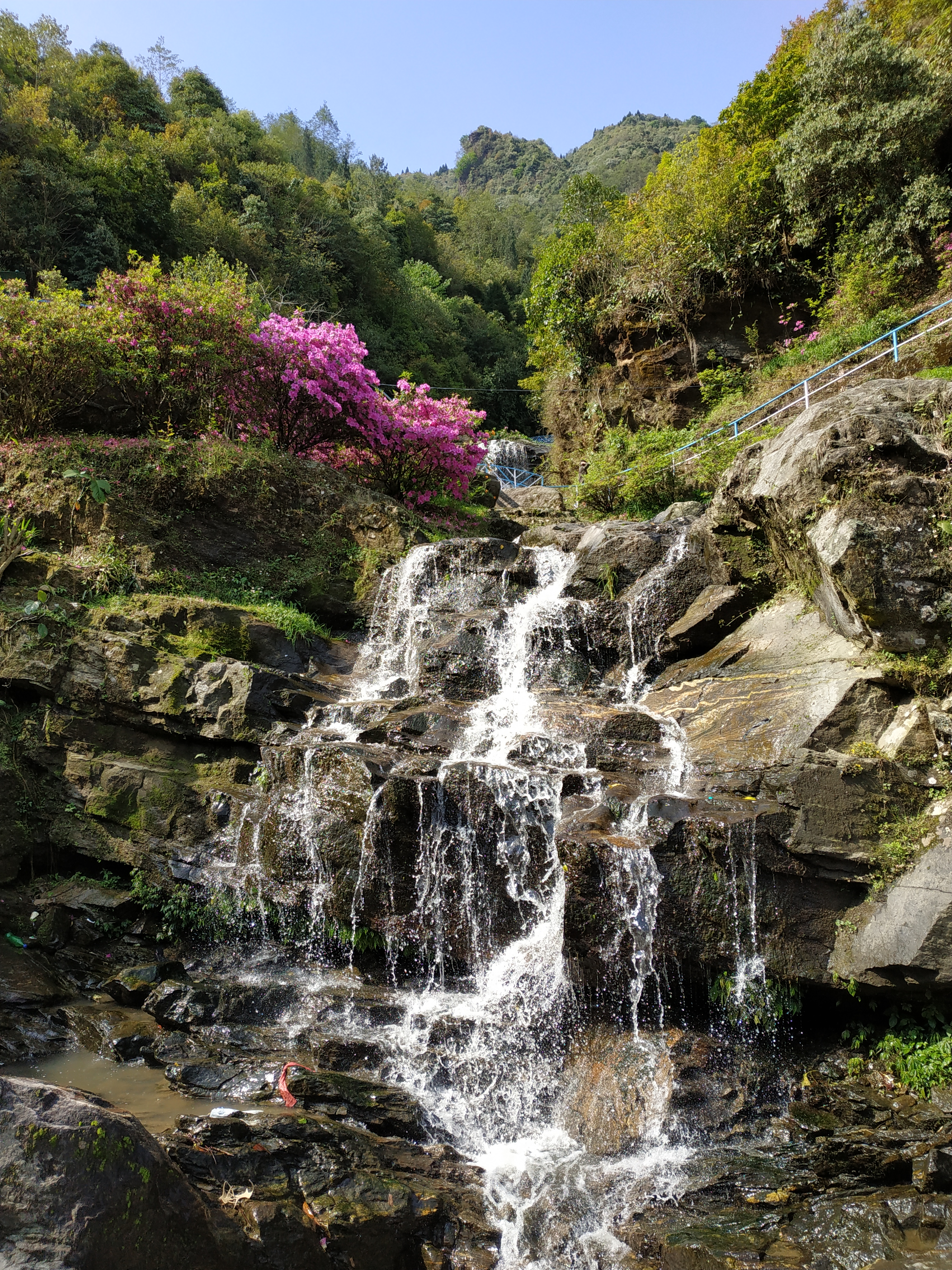
Waterflow from waterfalls

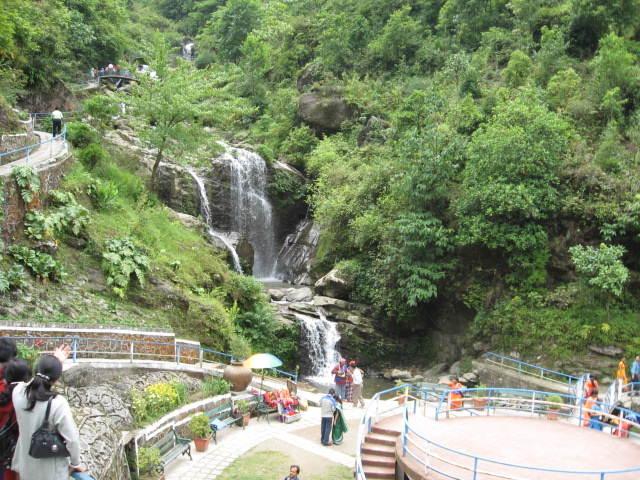
Chunnu Summer Falls in the garden

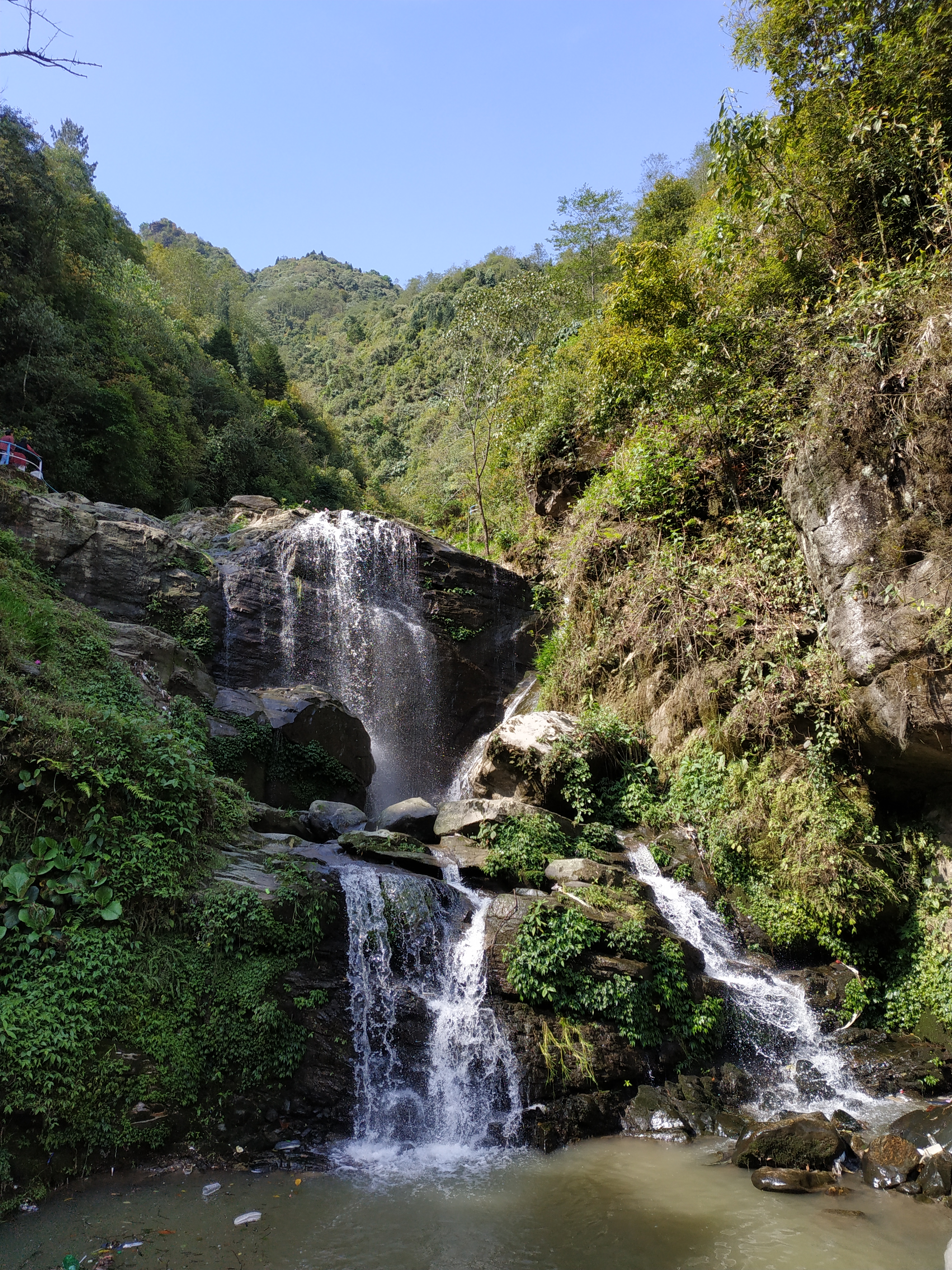
A waterfall at Rock Gardens in Darjeeling

== See also ==
- Chowrasta Darjeeling
- Rock Garden, Chandigarh
