= Japanese Garden, Chandigarh =

Park located in Sector 31, Chandigarh

Coordinates: 30°42′16″N 76°46′55″E

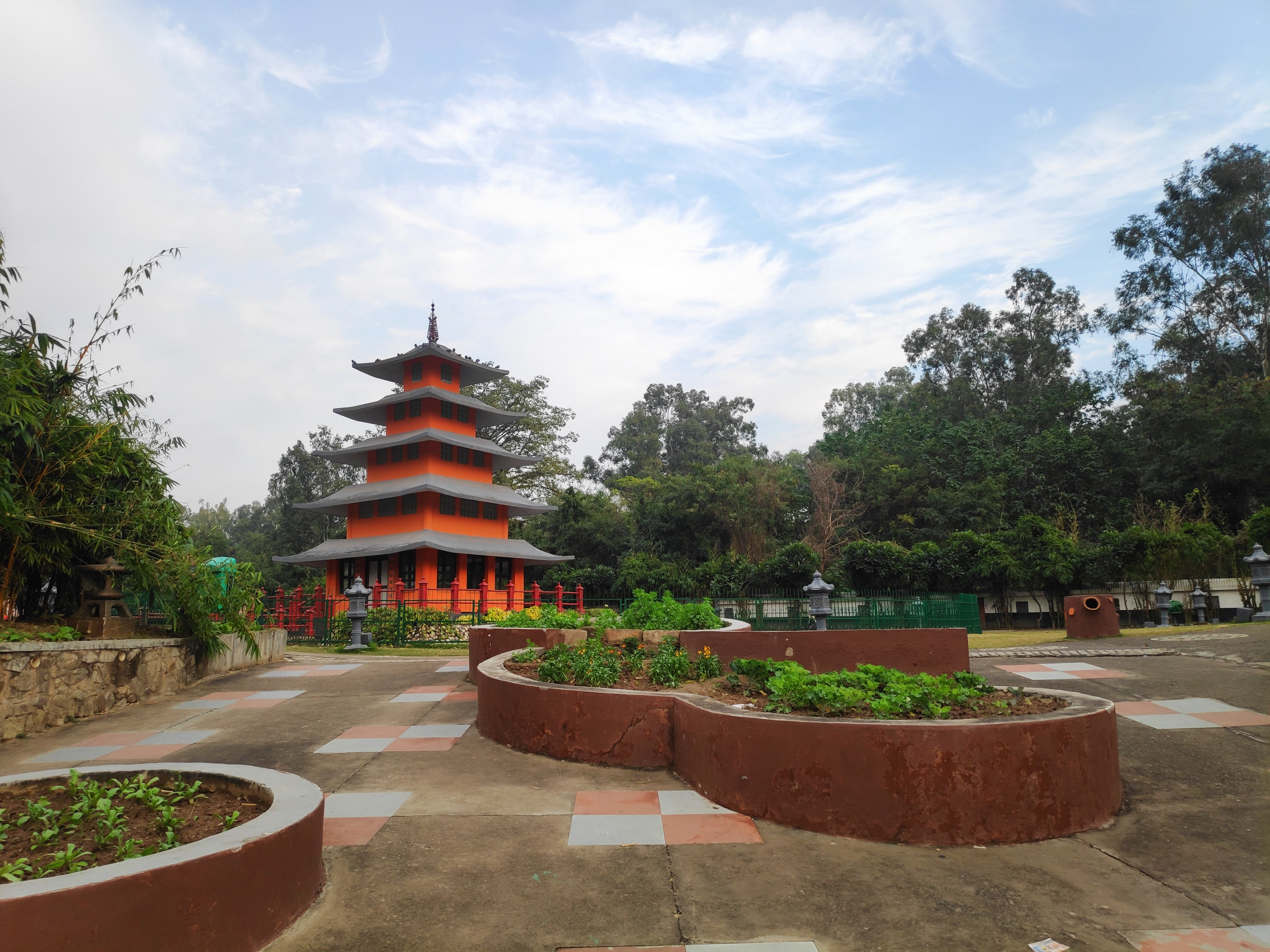
- Interactive map of Japanese Garden, Chandigarh
- Location: Sector 31-A, Chandigarh
- Area: 13 acres
- Website: https://www.facebook.com/japanese.garden.chandigarh.punjab

The Japanese Garden is a park located in Sector 31 in the Union Territory of Chandigarh. Built in 2014 on 13 acres of land by the Indian Government, it was inaugurated by Shivraj Patil on 7 November 2014. It consists of water bodies, pagoda towers, waterfalls, a meditation centre, a Buddha idol, and golden bamboos. This is the first ever garden in Chandigarh created with a Japanese touch. It has been developed at a cost of ₹6 crore.

The Japanese Garden was developed in two phases. Phase-1 was inaugurated on 7 November 2014 and Phase-2 was opened to the public on 4 June 2016. Both the phases of the park are connected by a tunnel decorated by beautiful Japanese paintings on both sides. The garden is designed using Japanese architecture and each of the elements in the garden is given a unique Japanese touch.

== Image Gallery ==
The Japanese Garden Chandigarh

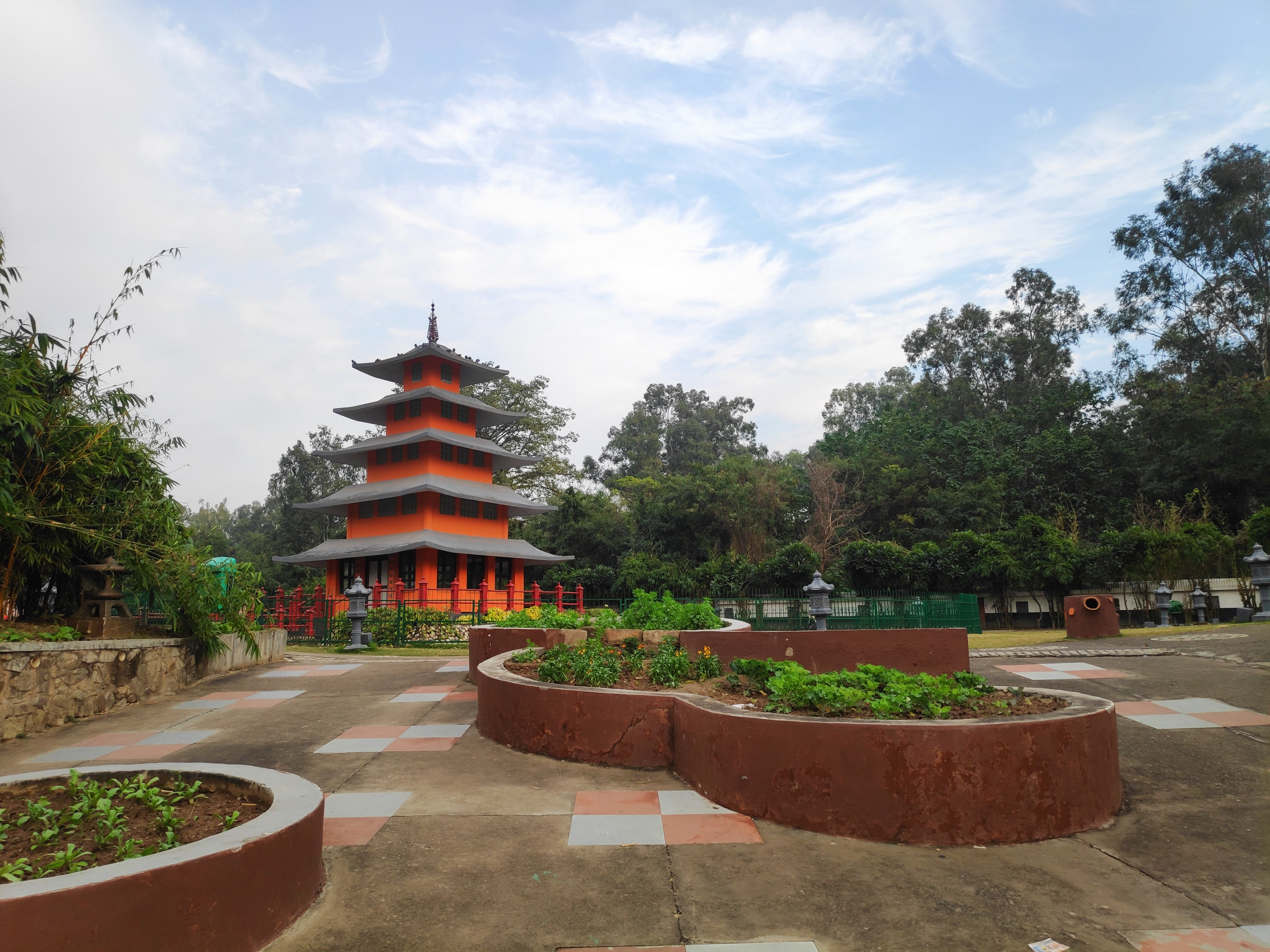
The Japanese Garden Chandigarh scenery

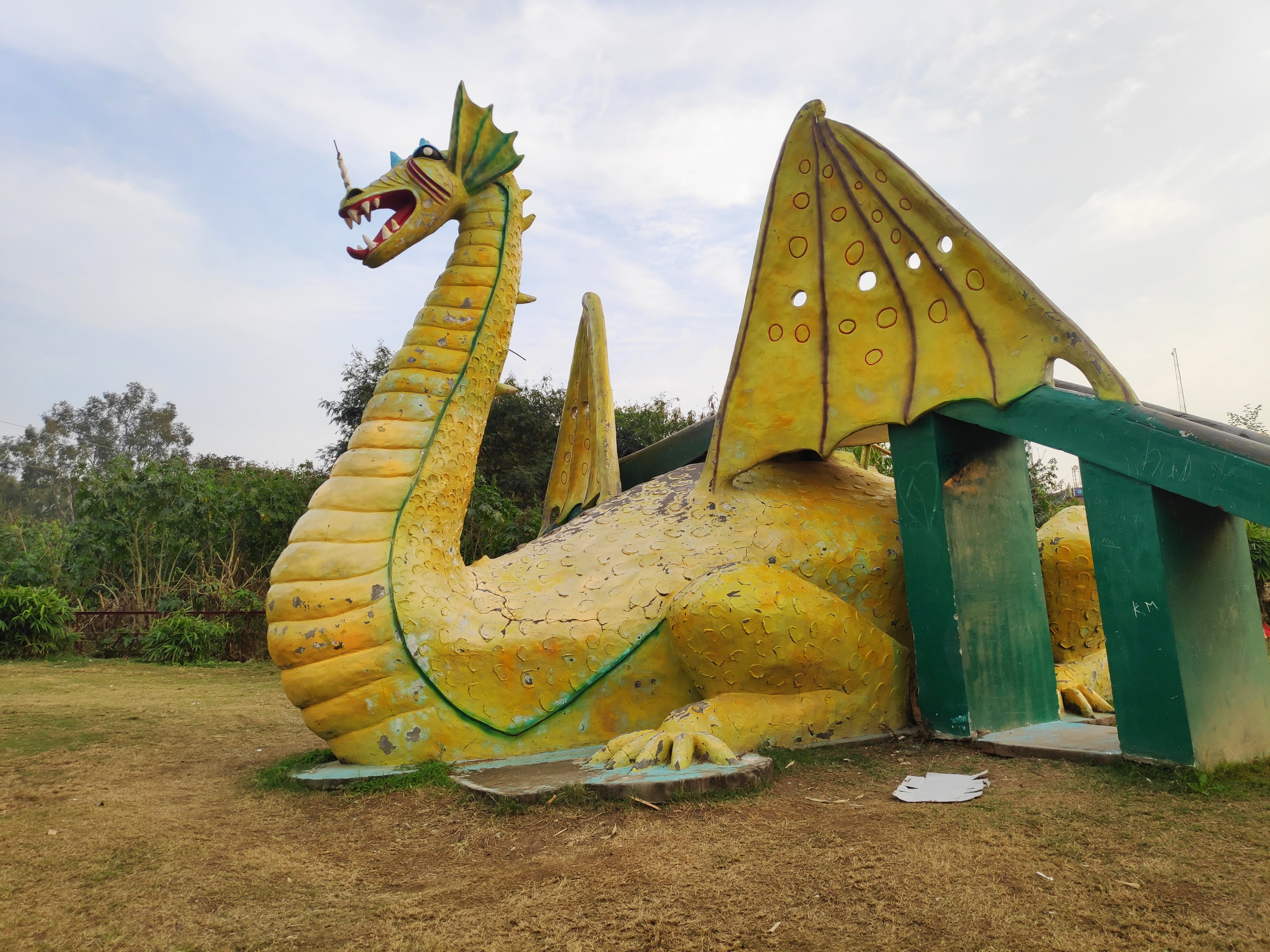
Dragon monument on chandigarh japanese garden

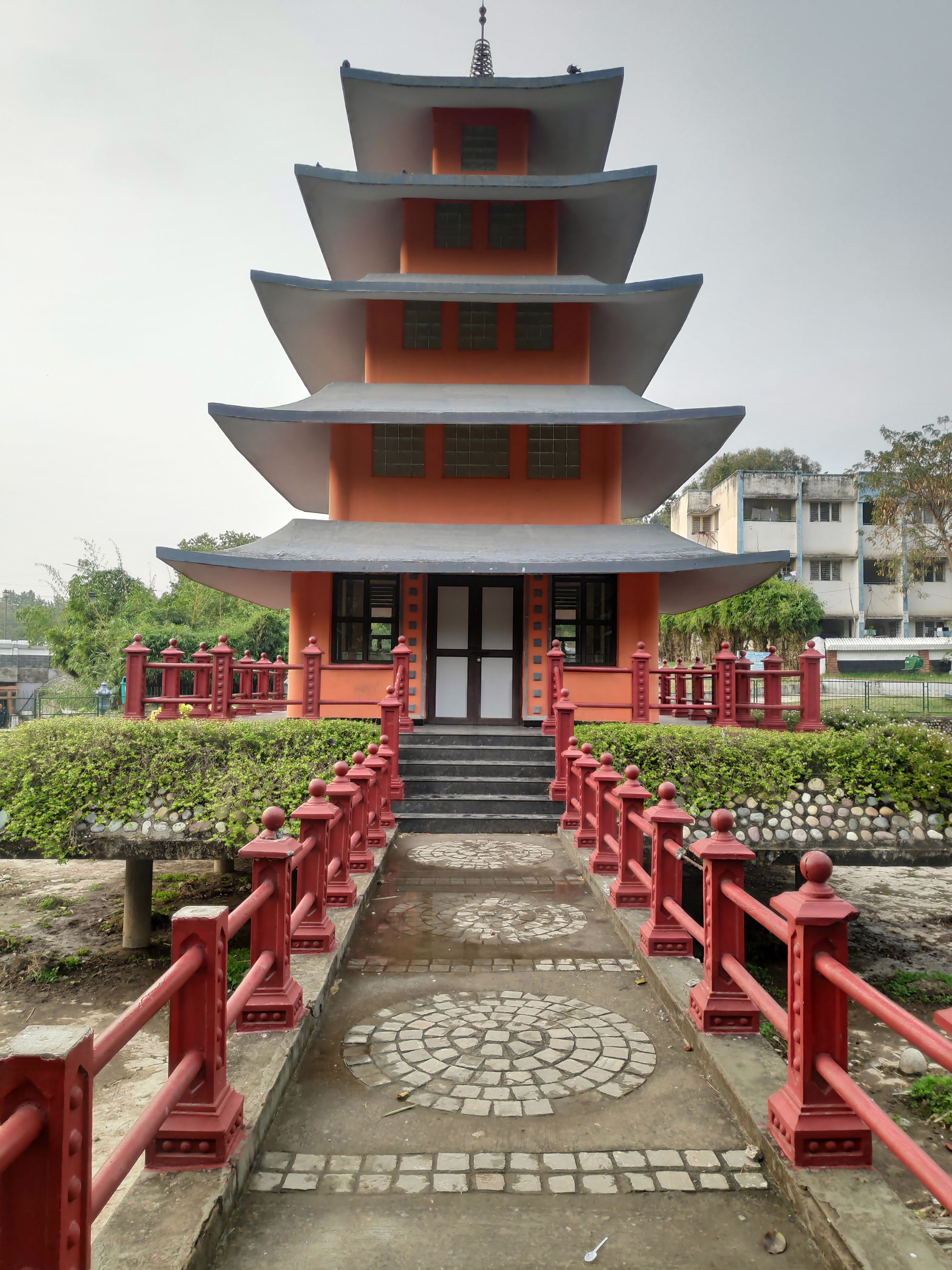
Japanese style building in chandigarh Japanese Garden

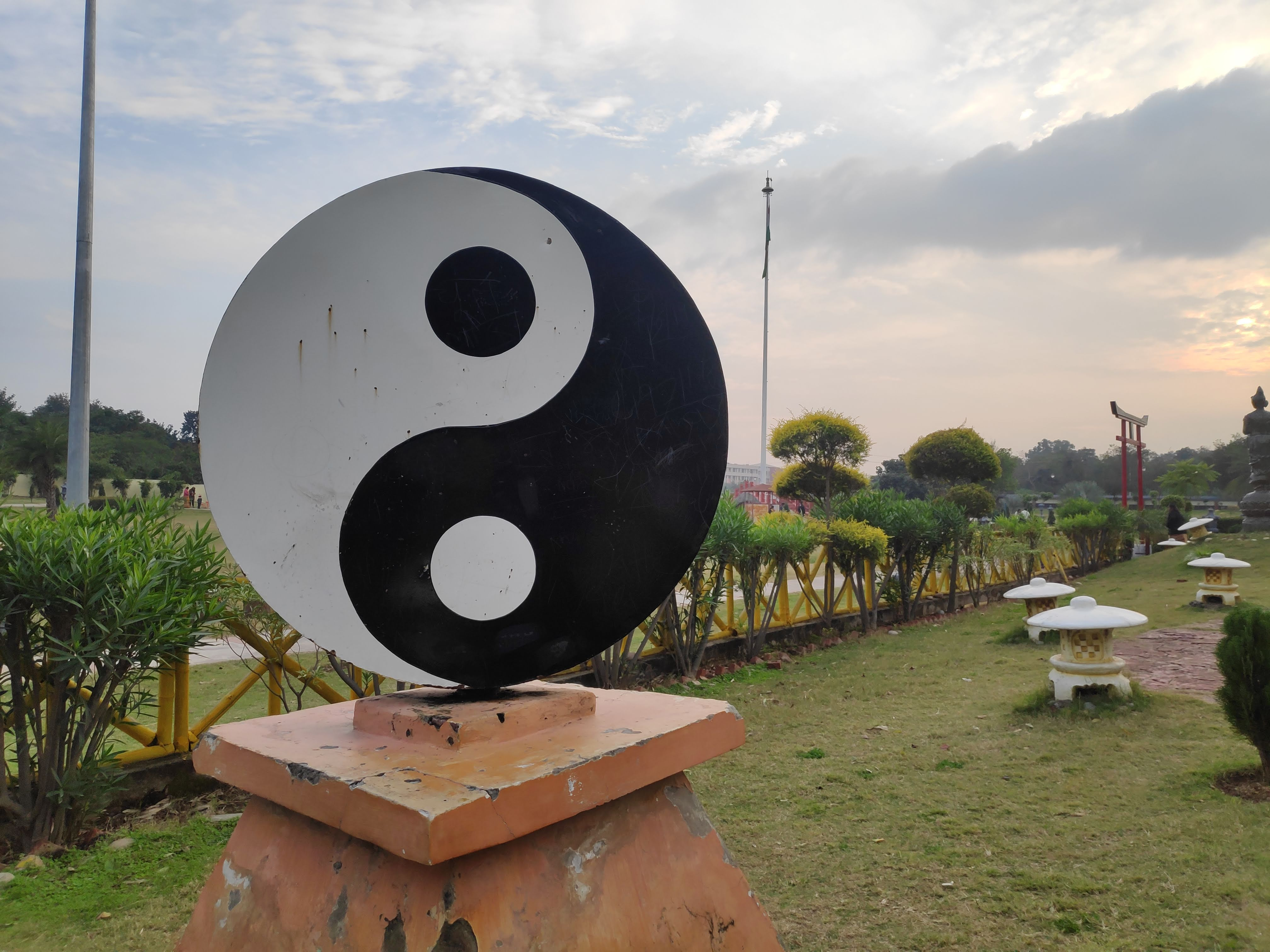
Ying yang in Japanese Garden Chandigarh

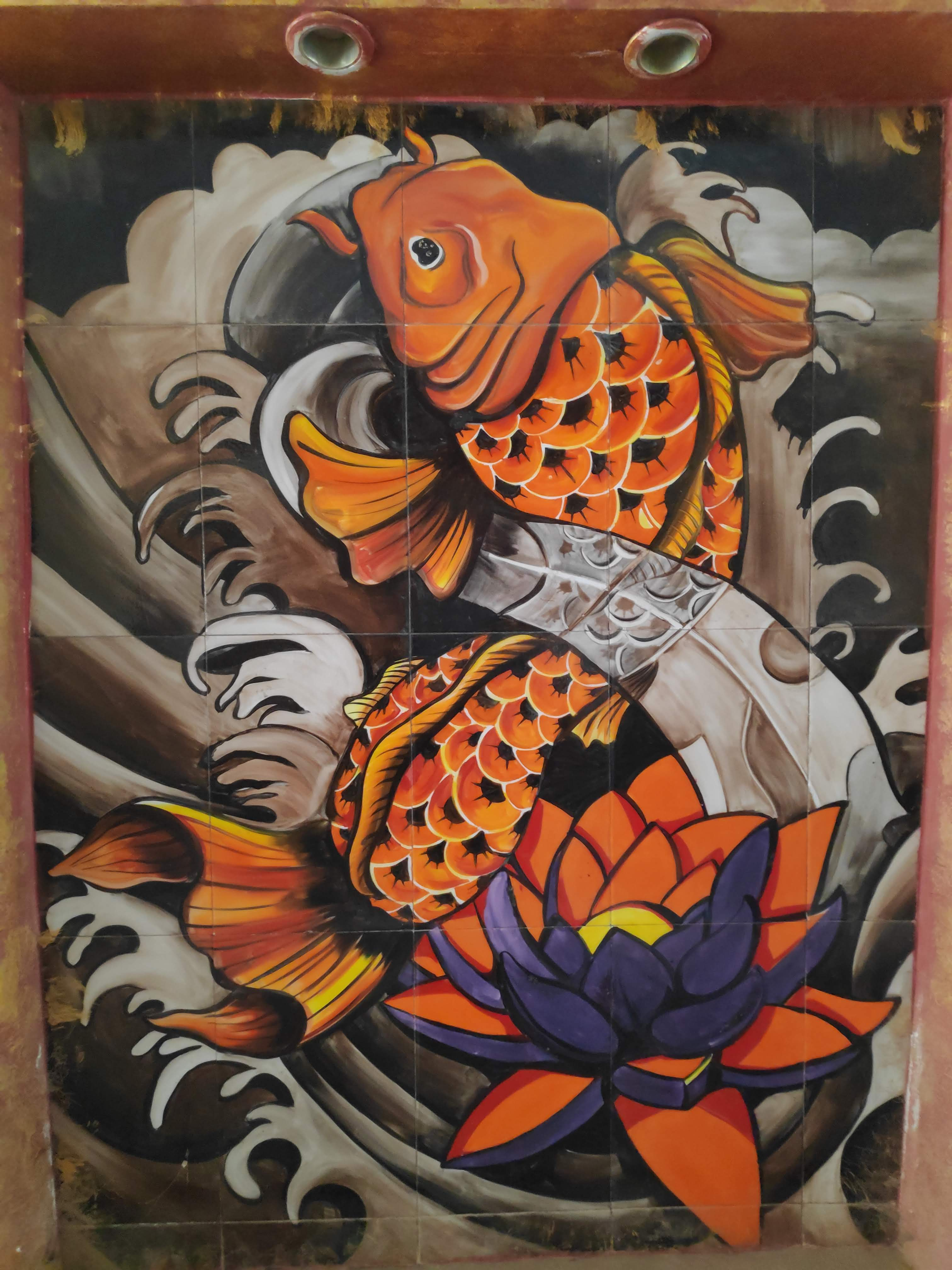
Fish painting in chandigarh japanese garden

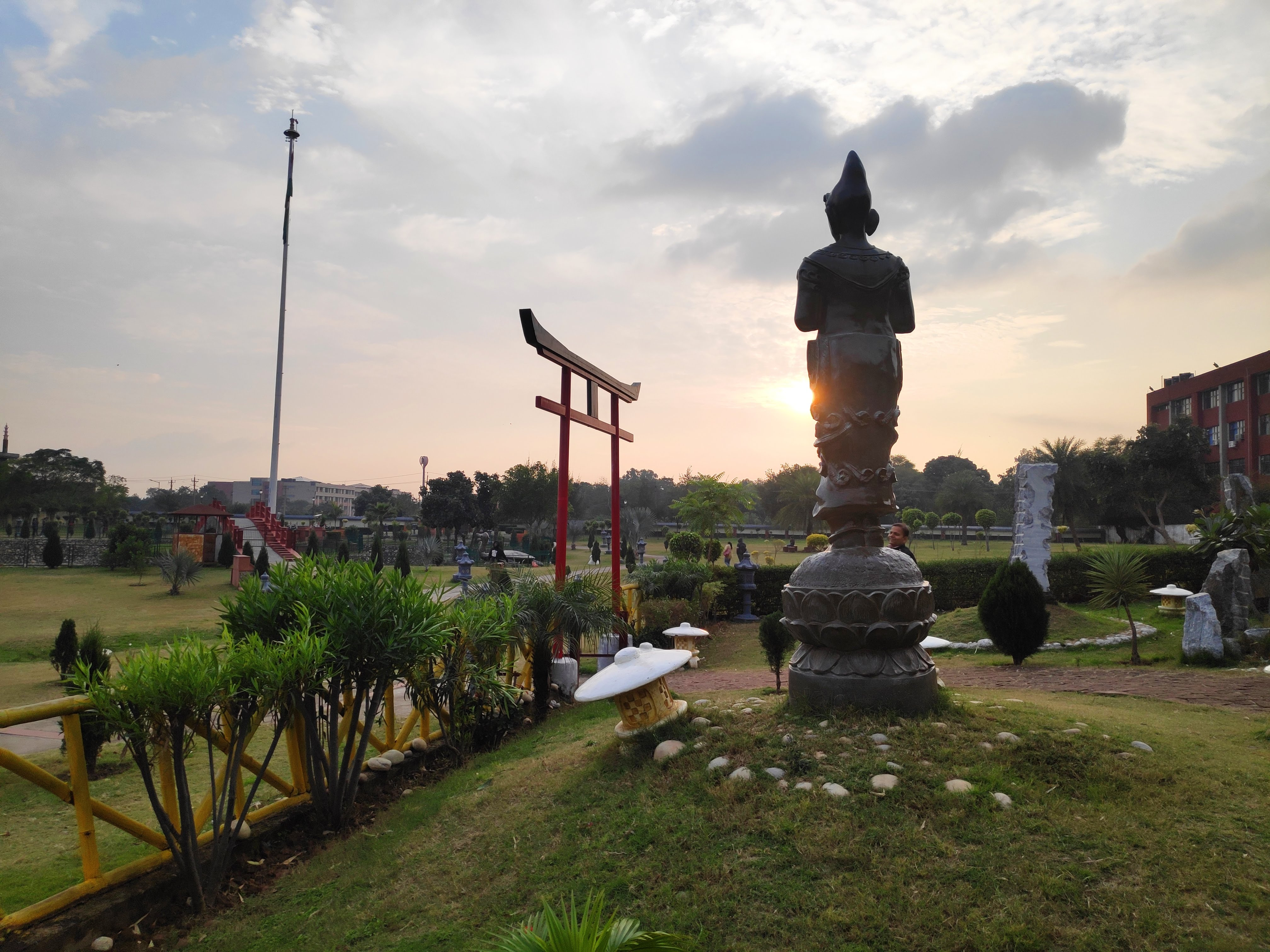
Parkview of chandigarh Japanese Garden

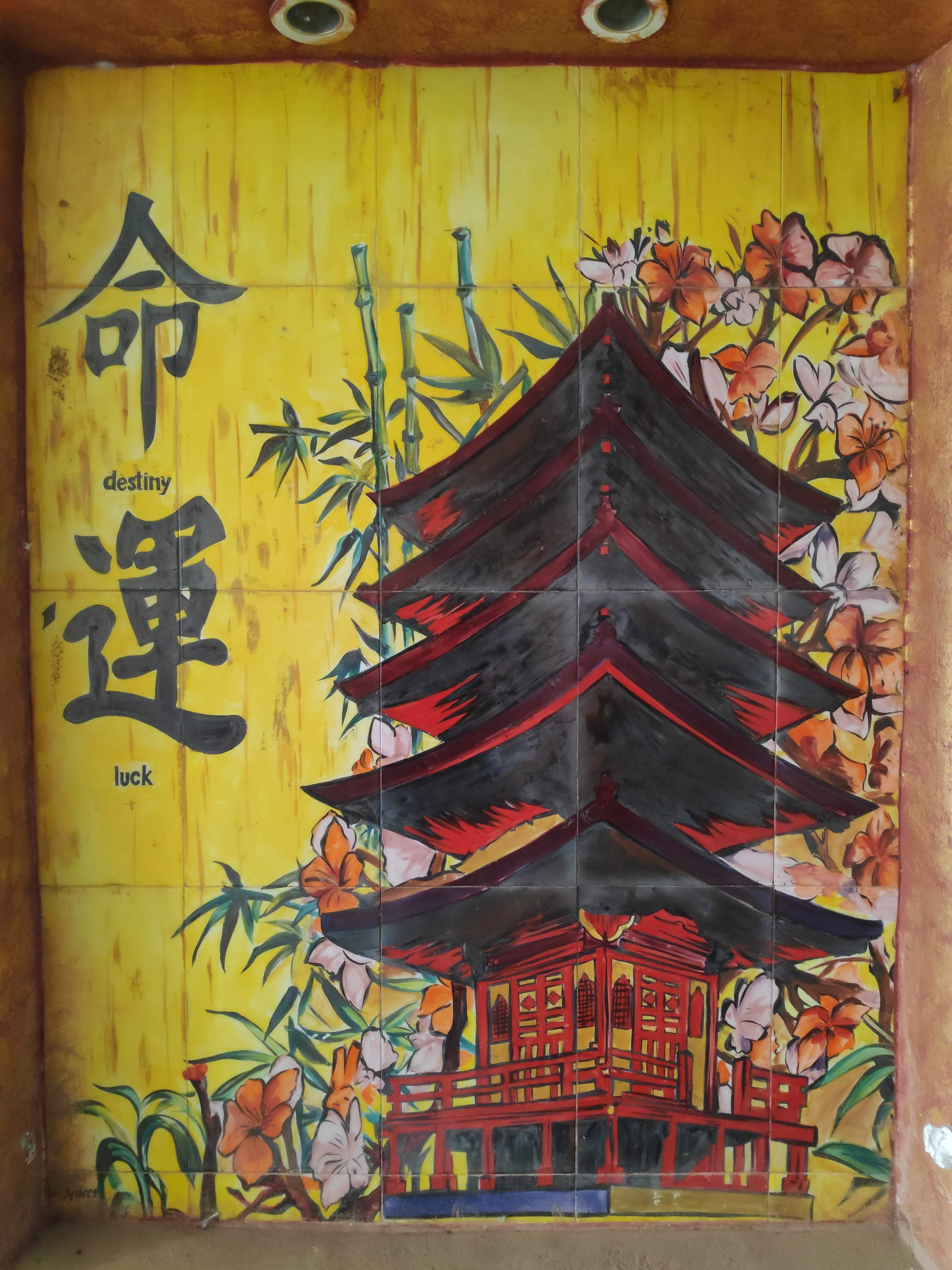
Painting on wall in chandigarh Japanese Garden

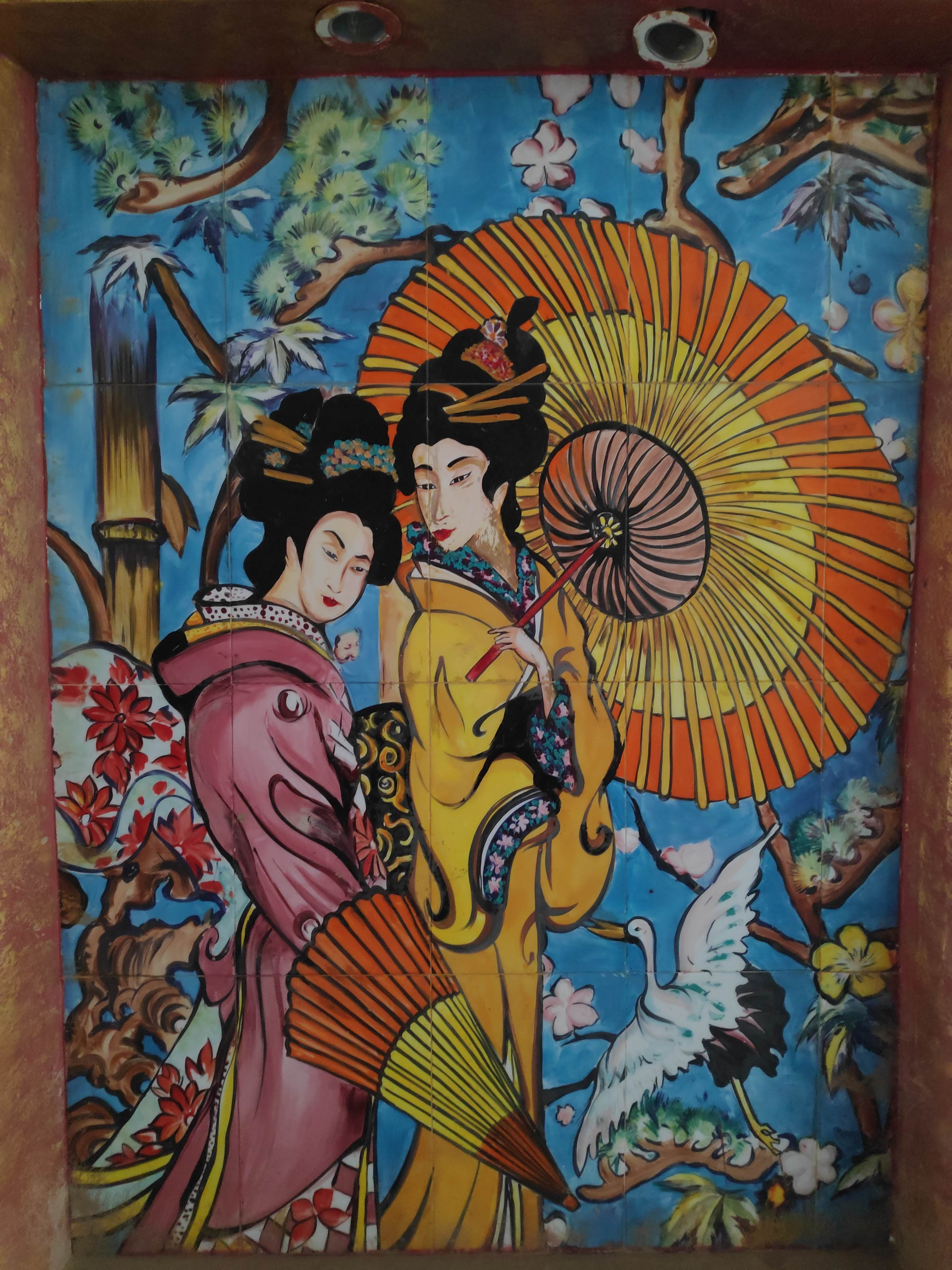
Painting depicting japanese style of cloths & trends

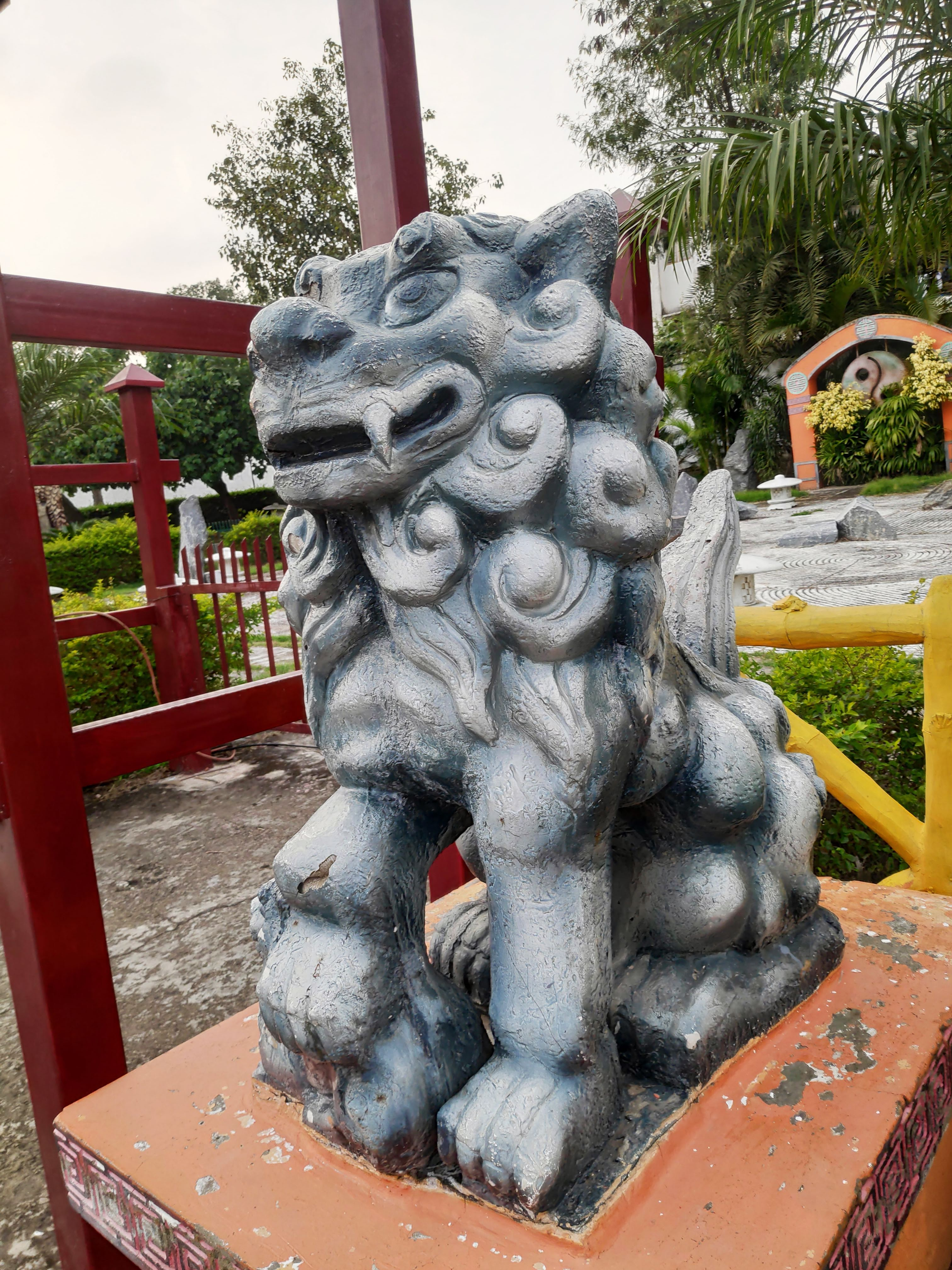
Handcrafted stone lion stone art on chandigarh Japanese Garden

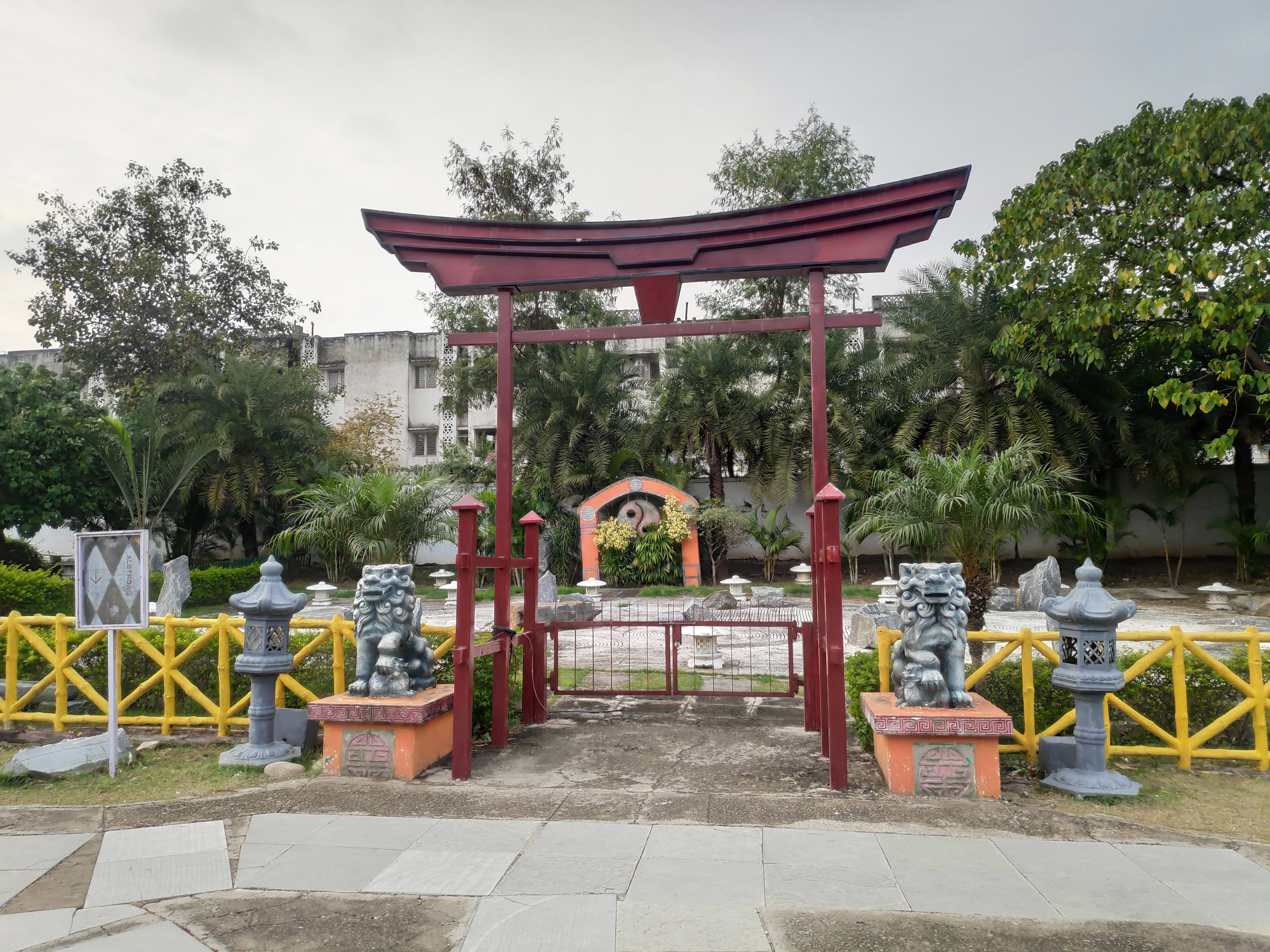
Japanese style gate on chandigarh japanese garden

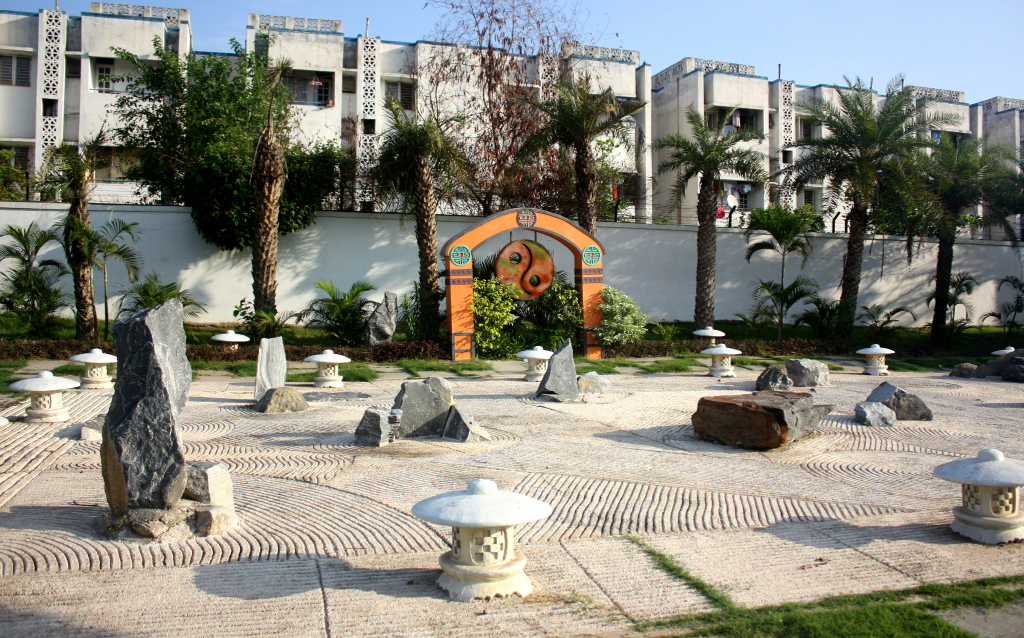
The Japanese Rock Garden (Phase - 1) - Japanese Garden Chandigarh

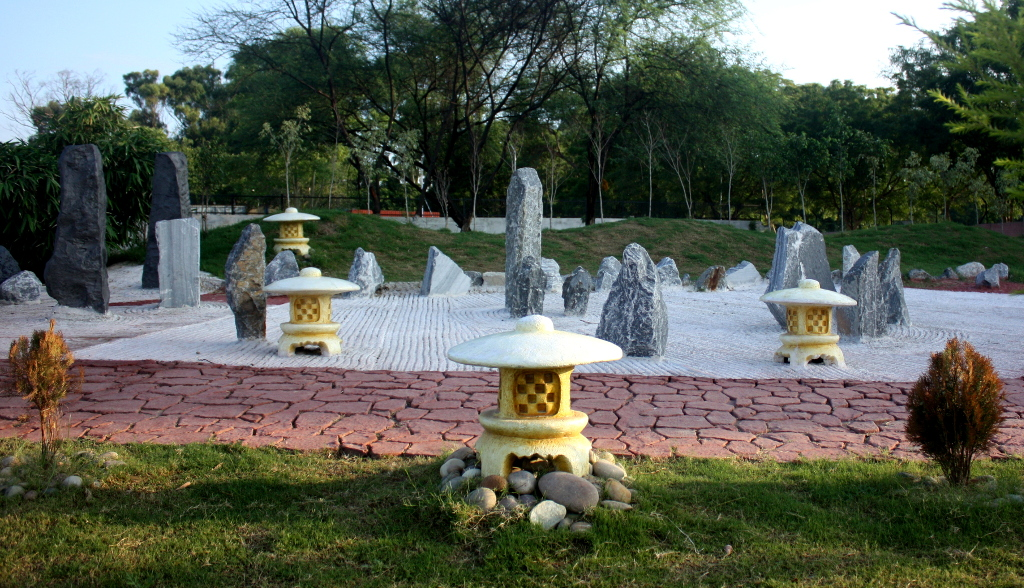
Japanese Rock Garden (Phase - 2) - Japanese Garden Chandigarh

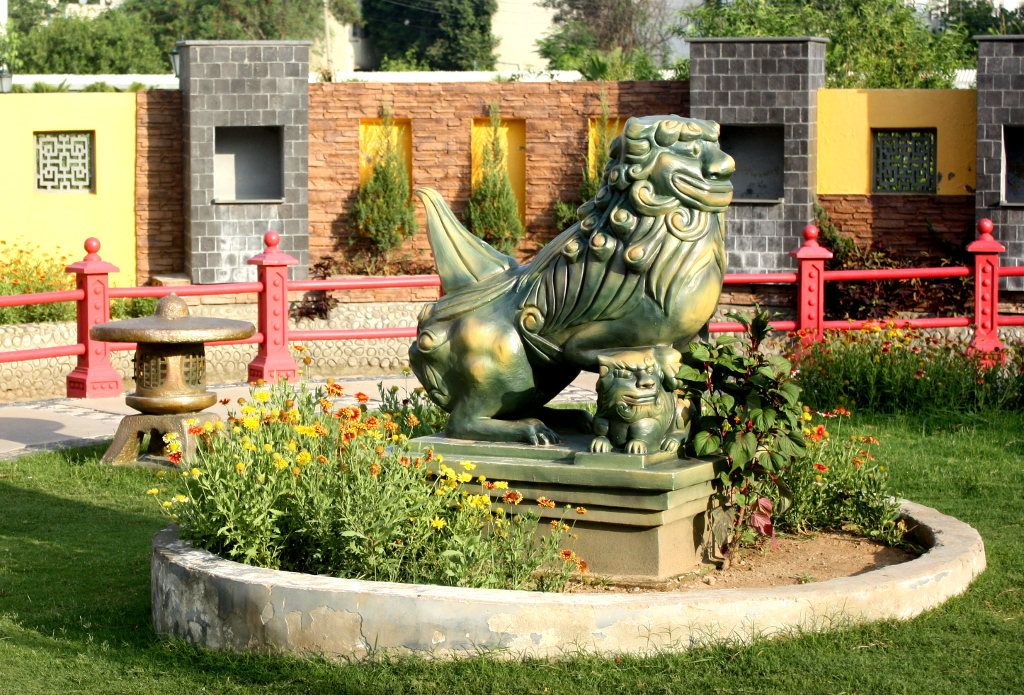
The Lion Dog Sculpture - Japanese Garden Chandigarh

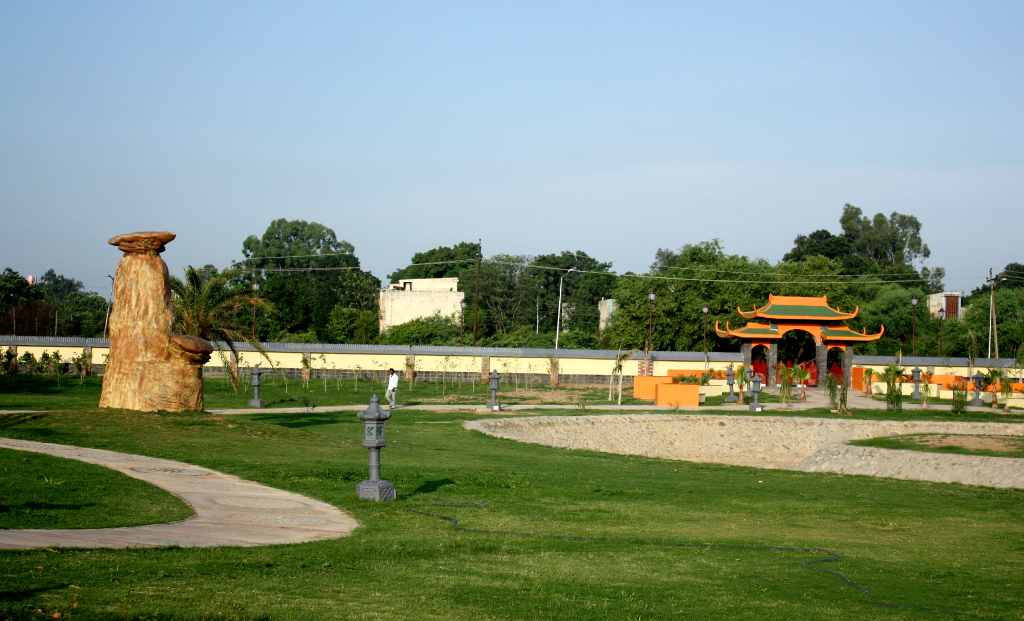
The Green Landscape - Japanese Garden Chandigarh

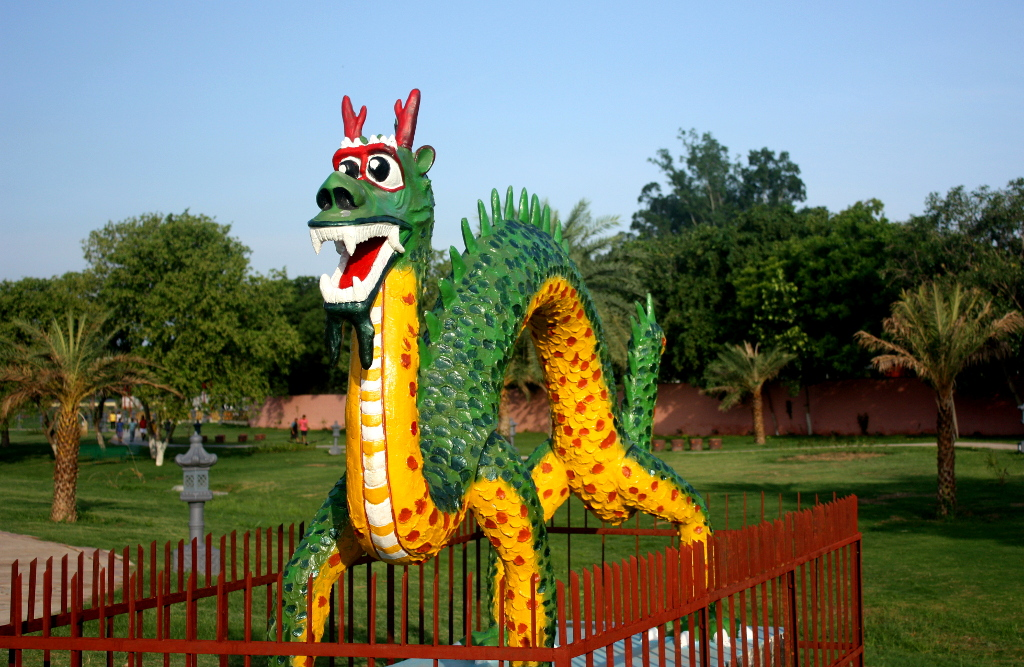
The Dragon Sculpture - Japanese Garden Chandigarh

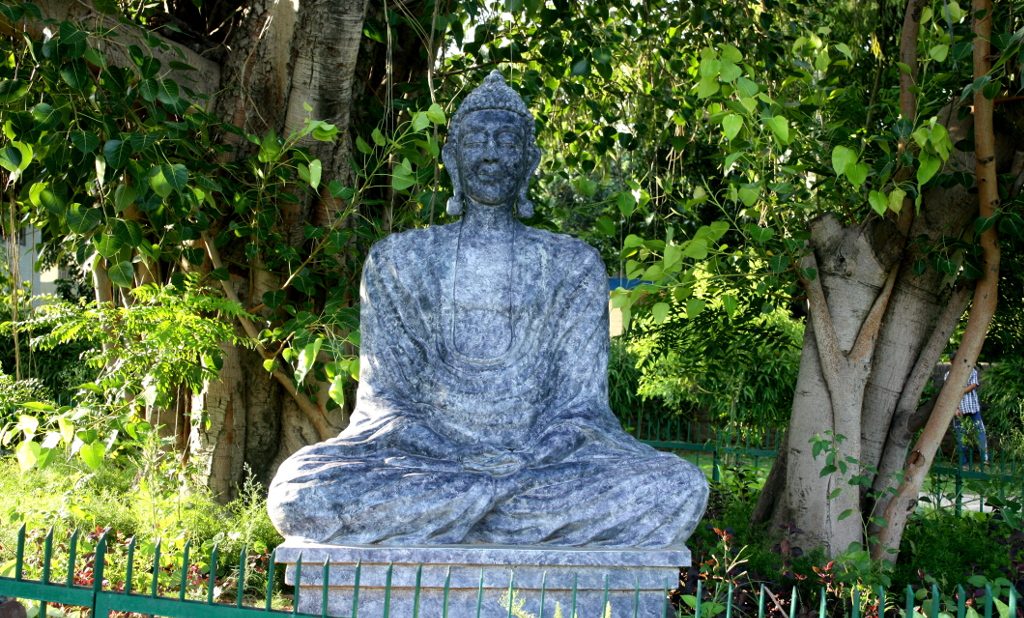
The Gautam Buddha Statue - Japanese Garden Chandigarh

== See also ==
- Rock Garden of Chandigarh
- Zakir Hussain Rose Garden
