= Rock Garden of Chandigarh =

Sculpture garden in Chandigarh, India

Rock Garden
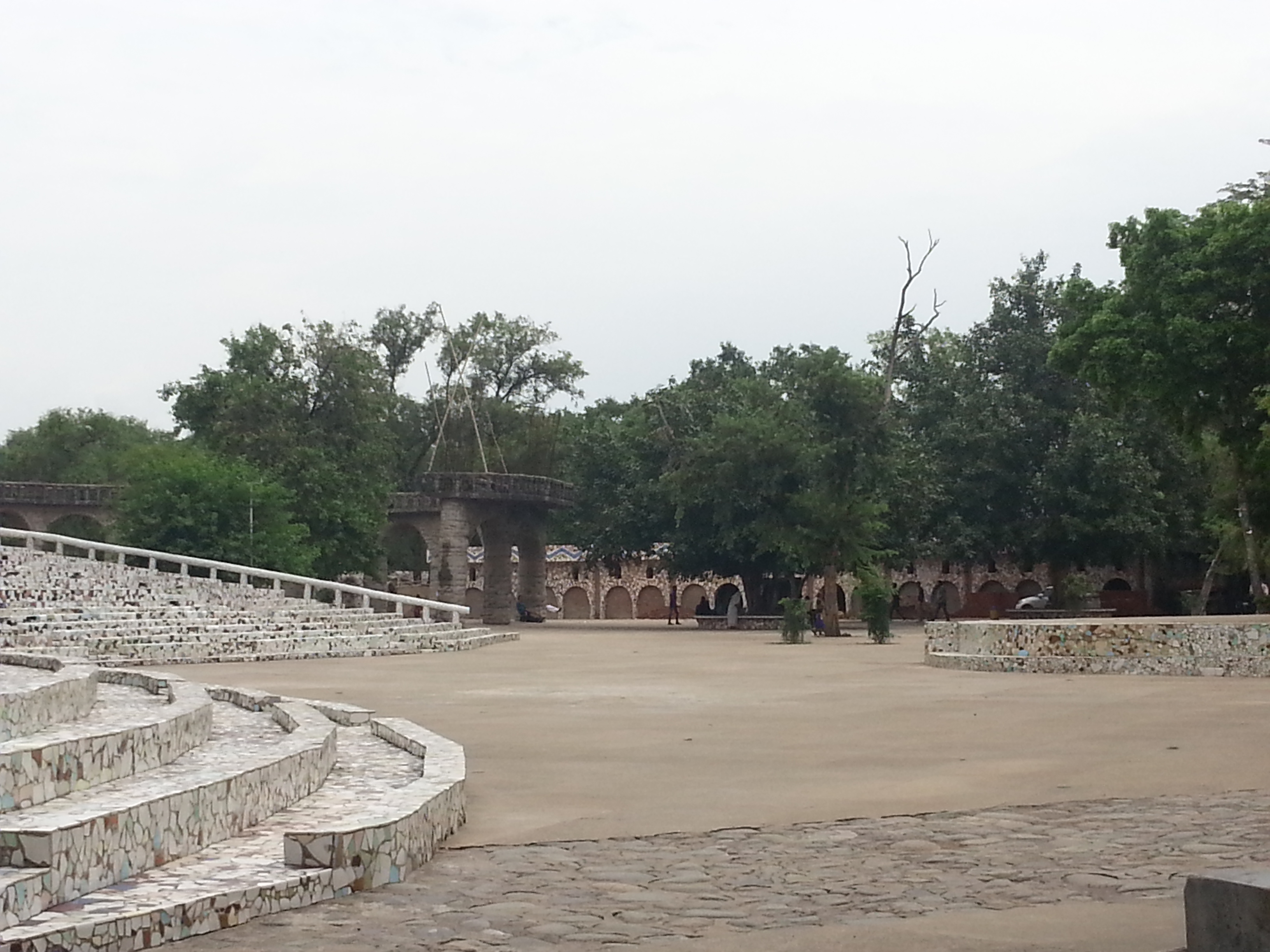
- Interactive map of Rock Garden
- Type: Urban park
- Location: Chandigarh, India
- Coordinates: 30.752°N 76.807°E
- Area: 160,000 sq.m.
- Created: 1957-1976
- Visitors: 1.5 million

The Rock Garden of Chandigarh is a sculpture garden in Chandigarh, India. It is also known as Nek Chand Saini's Rock Garden of Nathupur after its founder Nek Chand Saini, a government official who started building the garden secretly in his spare time in 1957. It has spread over an area of 40 acres (16 ha), and is completely built from industrial, home waste, and discarded items.

== Description ==
The Rock Garden sits near Sukhna Lake. It consists of man-made interlinked waterfalls and many other sculptures that have been made of scrap and other kinds of waste (bottles, glasses, bangles, tiles, ceramic pots, sinks, electrical waste, broken pipes, etc.) which are placed in walled paths.

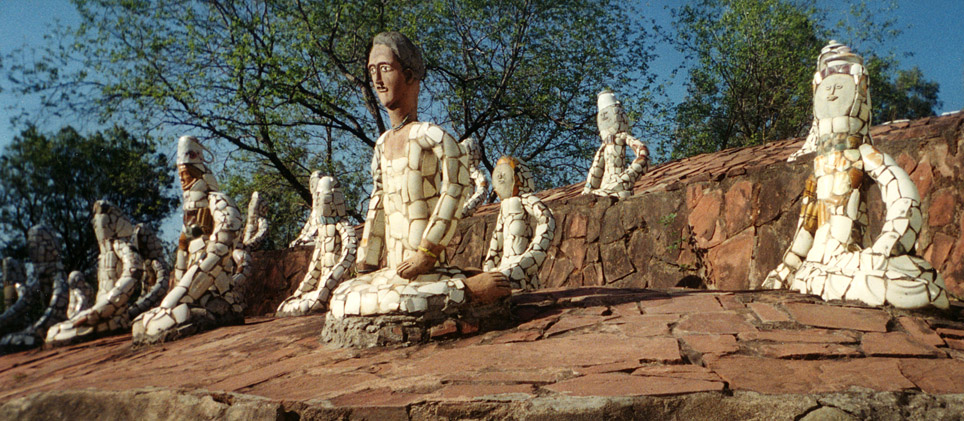
The garden is most famous for its sculptures made from recycled ceramic

In his spare time, Nek Chand started collecting materials from demolition sites around the city. He recycled these materials into his own vision of the divine kingdom of Sukrani, choosing a gorge in a forest near Sukhna Lake for his work. The gorge had been designated as a land conservancy, a forest buffer established in 1902 that nothing could be built on. Chand's work was illegal, but he was able to hide it for 18 years before it was discovered by the authorities in 1975. By this time, it had grown into a 12-acre (4.9 ha) complex of interlinked courtyards, each filled with hundreds of pottery-covered concrete sculptures of dancers, musicians, and animals.

When Chand left the country on a lecture tour in 1990, the city withdrew its funding, and vandals attacked the park. The Rock Garden Society took over the administration and upkeep of this environment.

The garden is visited by 3,000-4,000 people daily.

== History ==
=== History and Motivations ===
The Rock Garden of Chandigarh, created by Nek Chand Saini, is a remarkable showcase of individual creativity and resourcefulness. Saini, a public works inspector, began this project clandestinely in 1957. During a period of rapid modernization in post-independence India, he collected discarded materials from demolition sites, turning waste into art. The garden initially started in a 5-acre forested area and was later expanded.

=== Construction and Statistics ===
Construction of the Rock Garden commenced in 1957 and continued secretly for nearly two decades before being discovered by authorities in 1975. At the time of its discovery, the garden had expanded to 12 acres. Recognizing its cultural and artistic value, local authorities decided to support and fund its continuation. Although exact details of the initial costs and labor are sparse, it is known that Saini worked almost alone in the beginning. Today, the Rock Garden spans 40 acres and features over 5,000 sculptures crafted from recycled materials like broken ceramics, glass bangles, neon tubes, and industrial debris.

=== Major Transformations and Cultural Significance ===
Since its official recognition, the Rock Garden has undergone significant transformations. It was opened to the public and expanded with new sections, including open-air theaters, pavilions, and artificial waterfalls. These additions have enriched the visitor experience and established the garden as a major cultural and tourist landmark.

The Rock Garden is acclaimed for its pioneering role in the environmental art and recycling movement. It demonstrates how art can transform urban spaces and engage communities. Saini's vision and creativity have created a space that not only offers aesthetic pleasure but also promotes sustainability and resource reuse.

=== Current State of Conservation and Challenges ===
Maintained by the Nek Chand Foundation and local authorities, the Rock Garden faces challenges such as natural wear and tear of the recycled materials and the harsh climate of Chandigarh, which accelerates the deterioration of the artworks. The large number of visitors also necessitates protective measures to prevent damage.

=== Dolls Museum ===
There is also a Dolls Museum inside Rock Garden. It was inaugurated by UT Administrator V.P. Singh Badnore to mark the second death anniversary of its founder Nek Chand. The museum comprises 200 rag dolls made from waste cloth. The dolls were made by Nek Chand in the 1970s.

== Partial demolition ==
In 2025, a part of the outer wall of the Rock Garden was demolished by the Chandigarh administration to make way for a road and parking space. The action was condemned by the general public and several protests were organised to address their concerns.

== Gallery ==
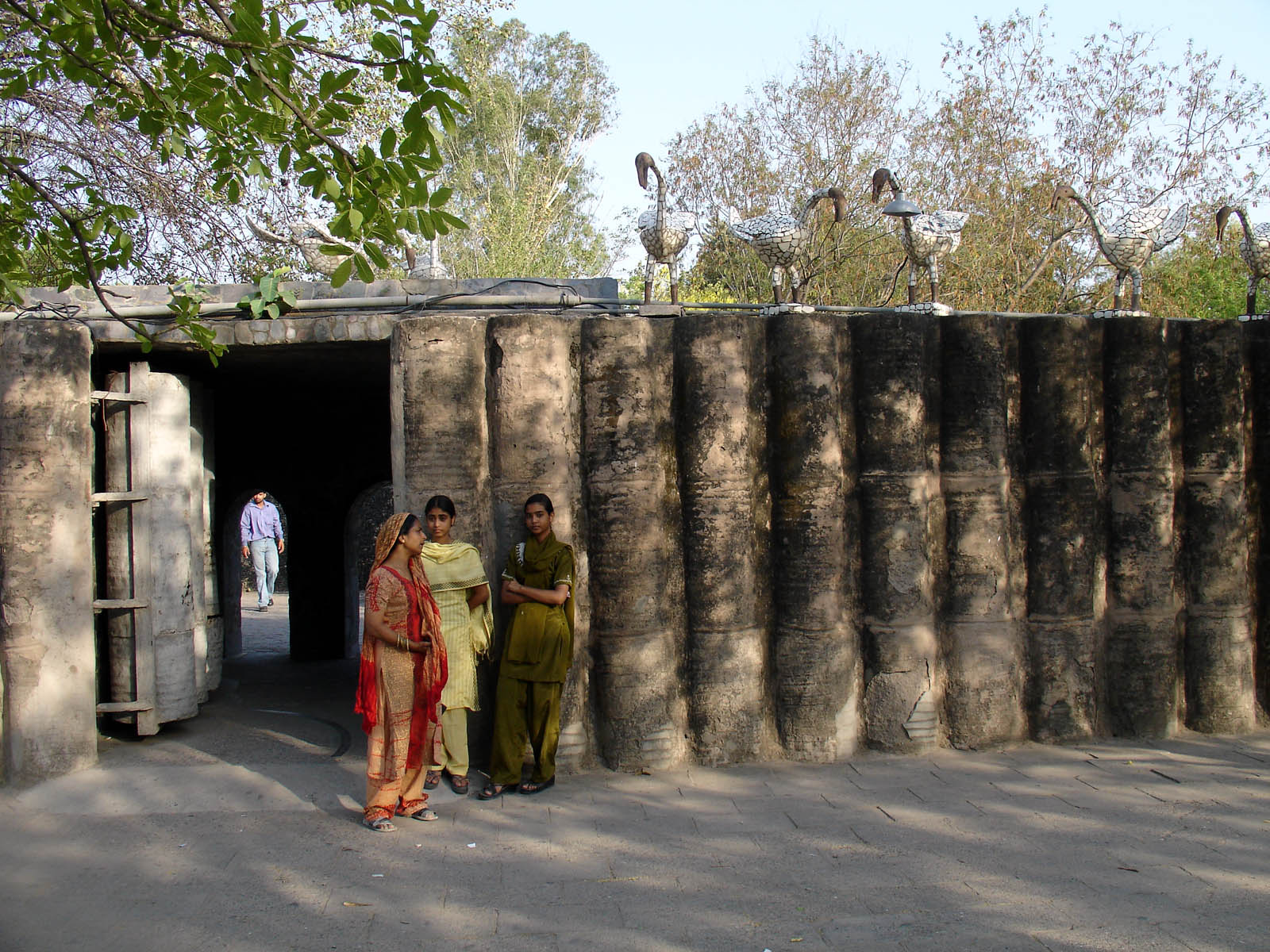
Entrance

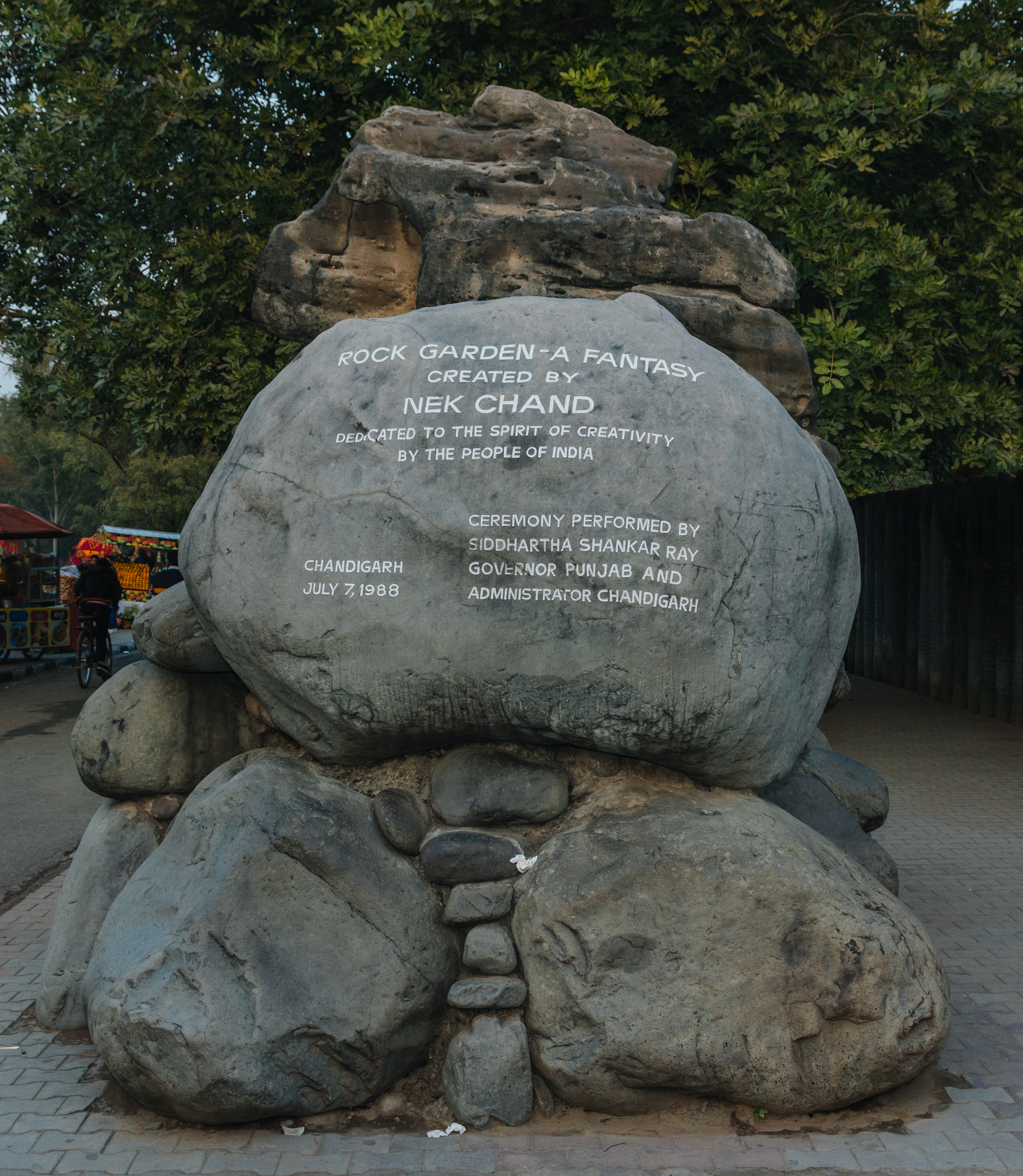
Dedication day memorial, 7 July 1988.

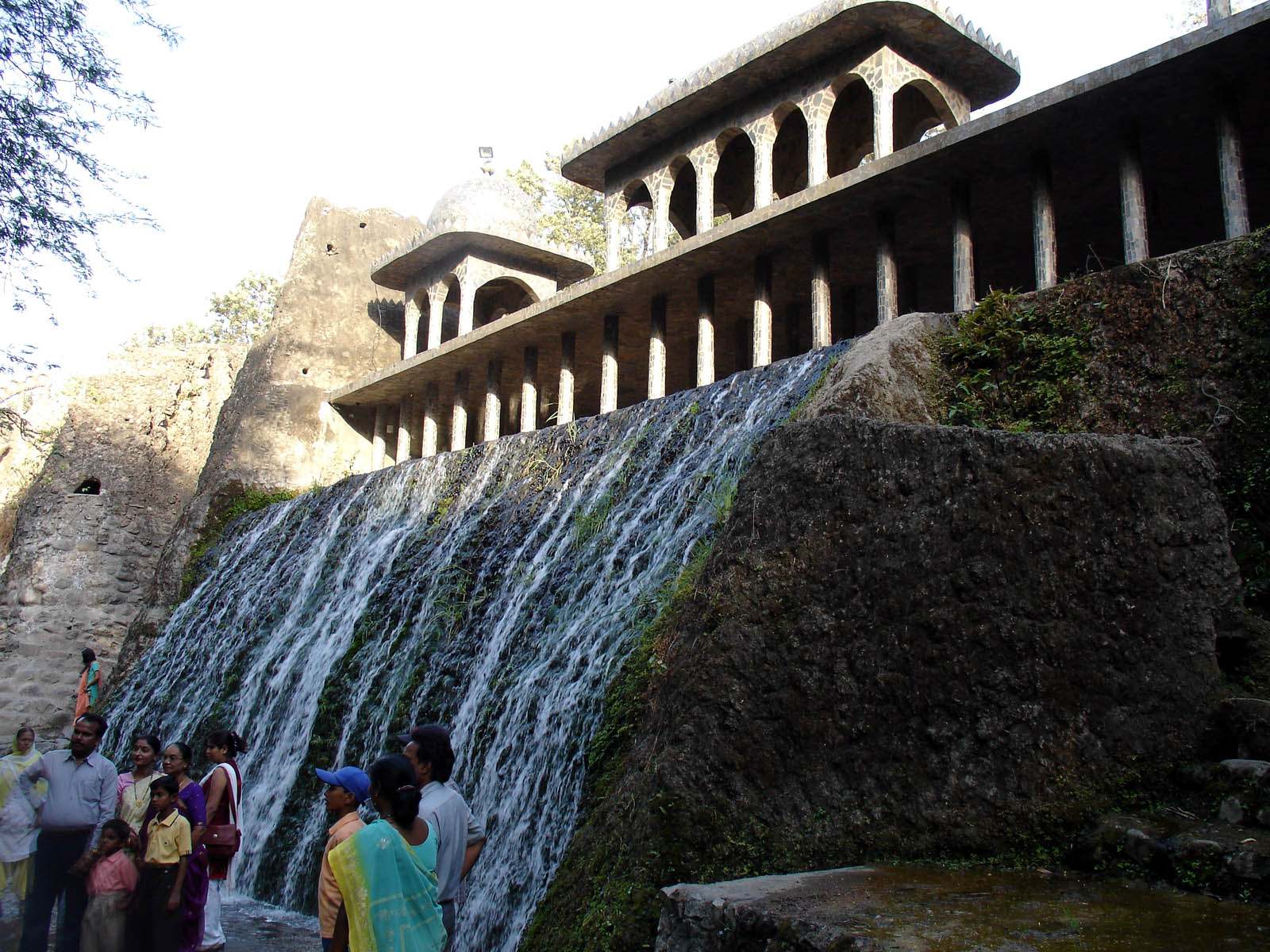
Rock Garden, Chandigarh, India

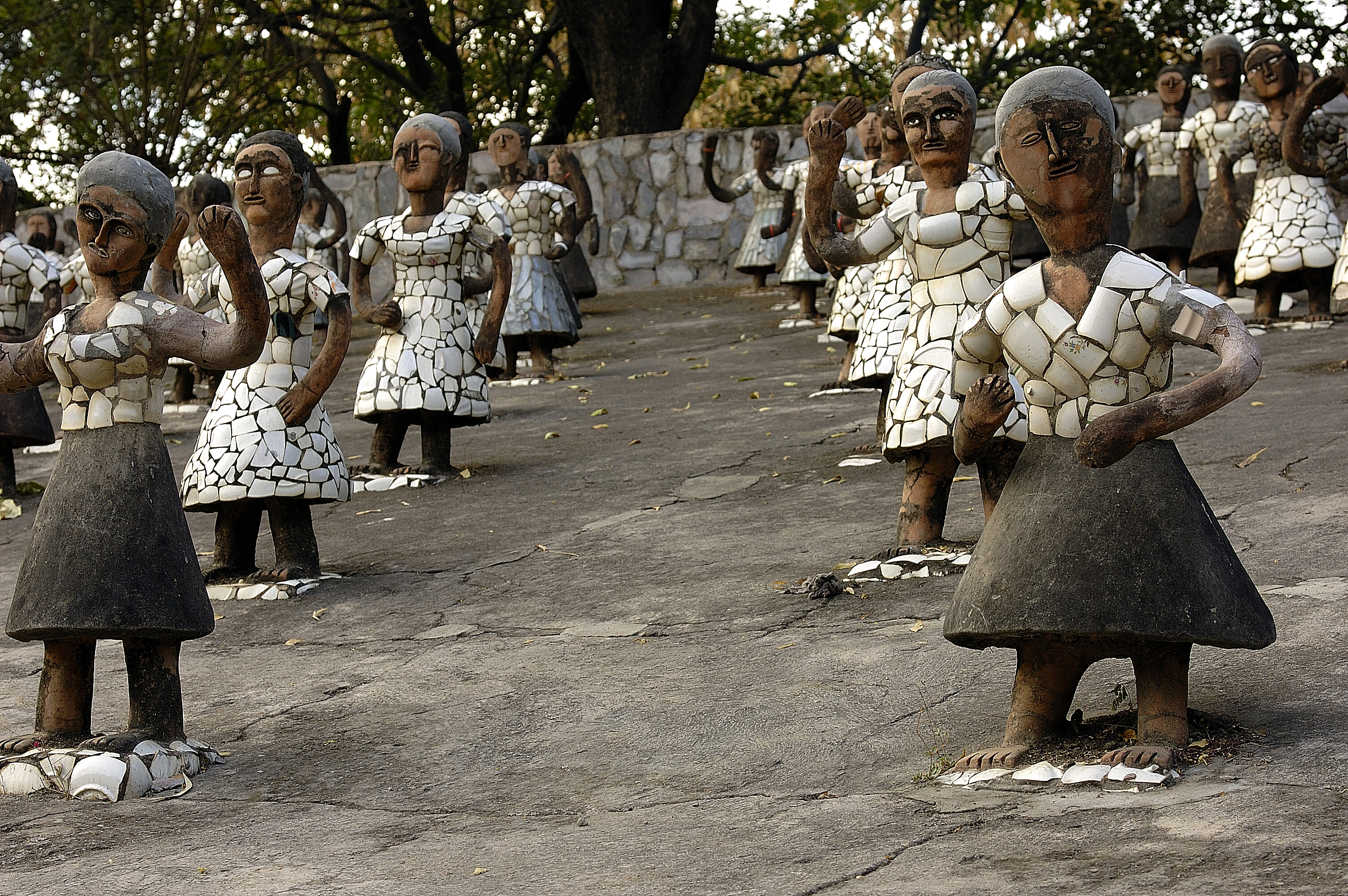
Dancing girls at Rock Garden, Chandigarh.

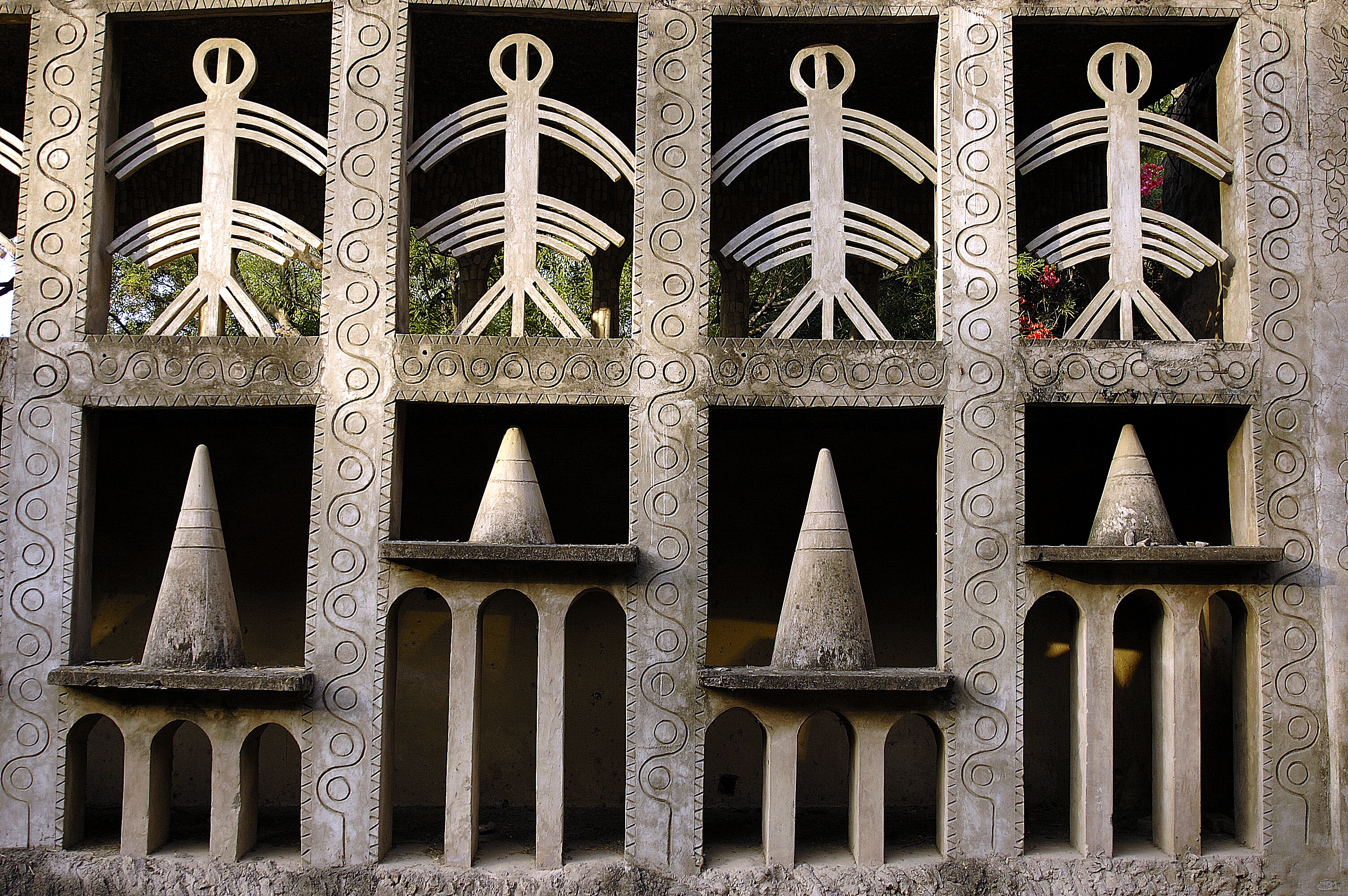
Decorated wall at Rock Garden.

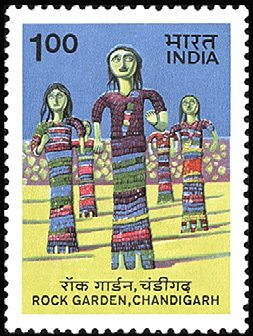
Stamp of India - 1983

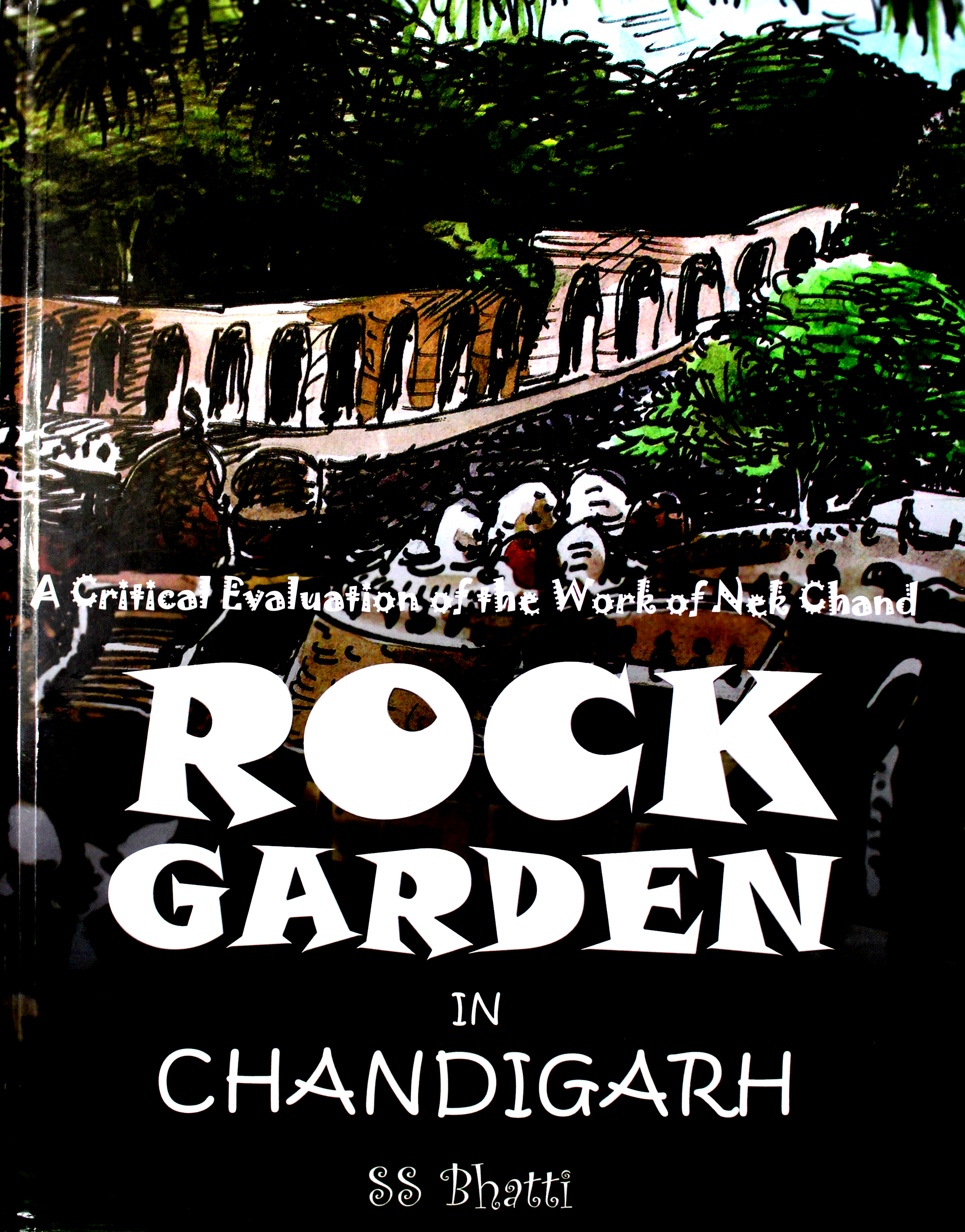
Rock Garden in Chandigarh - A book by Dr SS Bhatti.

== See also ==
- List of single-artist museums
- Japanese Garden, Chandigarh
