= Sukhna Interpretation Centre =

- Sukhna Gallery
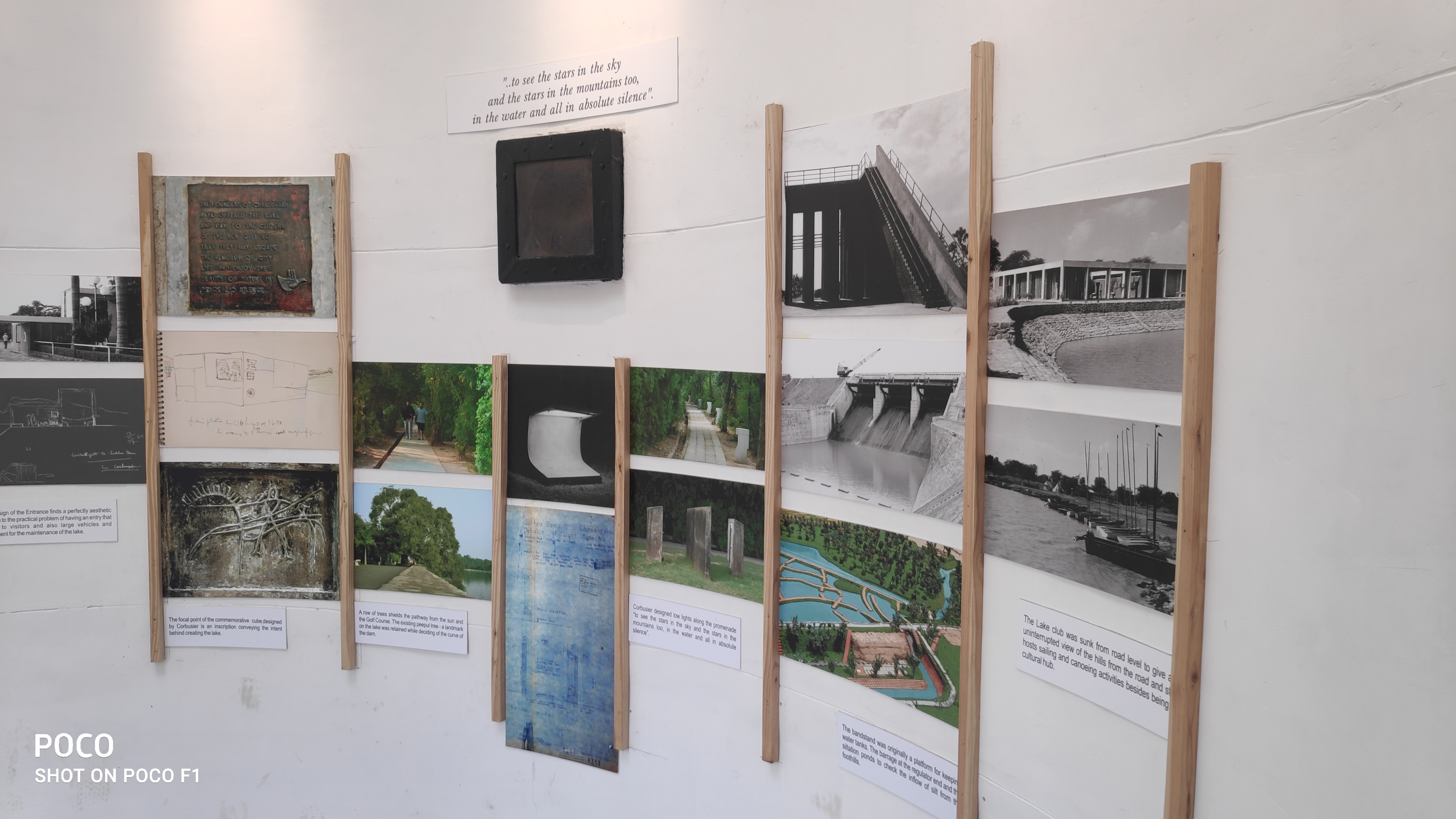
- Sukhna Gallery Inside View
- Location: Sukhna Lake
- Coordinates: 30.7386956°N 76.8133633°E
- Type: Art museum
- Accreditation: Administrator of Chandigarh
- Collections: Vintage Photos, sketches, drawings,
- Collection size: 30 Panels
- Architect: Pierre Jeanneret
- Parking: Sukhna Parking

The Sukhna Interpretation Centre/ Sukhna Gallery is an Indian art museum at Sukhna Lake. It was inaugurated by Manoj Parida who is the Advisor to the Administrator of Chandigarh on 4 December 2019, on the occasion of the 52nd anniversary of the death of Pierre Jeanneret. It was proposed by Deepika Gandhi who is the Director of Le Corbusier Center in May 2019.

== History ==
This structure was built to house a water pump and in spite of its impressive architecture remained locked and unused for over three decades. It was designed by a Swiss architect Pierre Jeanneret.

== Display ==
It has old pictures, drawings and sketches that reveal many aspects of Sukhna Lake such as light fixtures and the entrance gate. The structure was restored and renovated and has around 30 pictures. It also holds the books "'Moods of Sukhna and Sukhna - Sublime Lake of Chandigarh. (2009).

== Announcement and design ==
The announcement of converting this structure to the Interpretation Centre took place on 1 October 2019. It took the Engineering department two months to convert it.

== Challenges ==
- The circular shape and small size of the room which is 12 feet in diameter became a challenge. "During the restoration, a skylight which was closed some years back was opened up to let in natural light in the room. The ventilators were very interestingly designed and were the starting point for conception of the display of exhibits," Deepika Gandhi said.

== Gallery ==
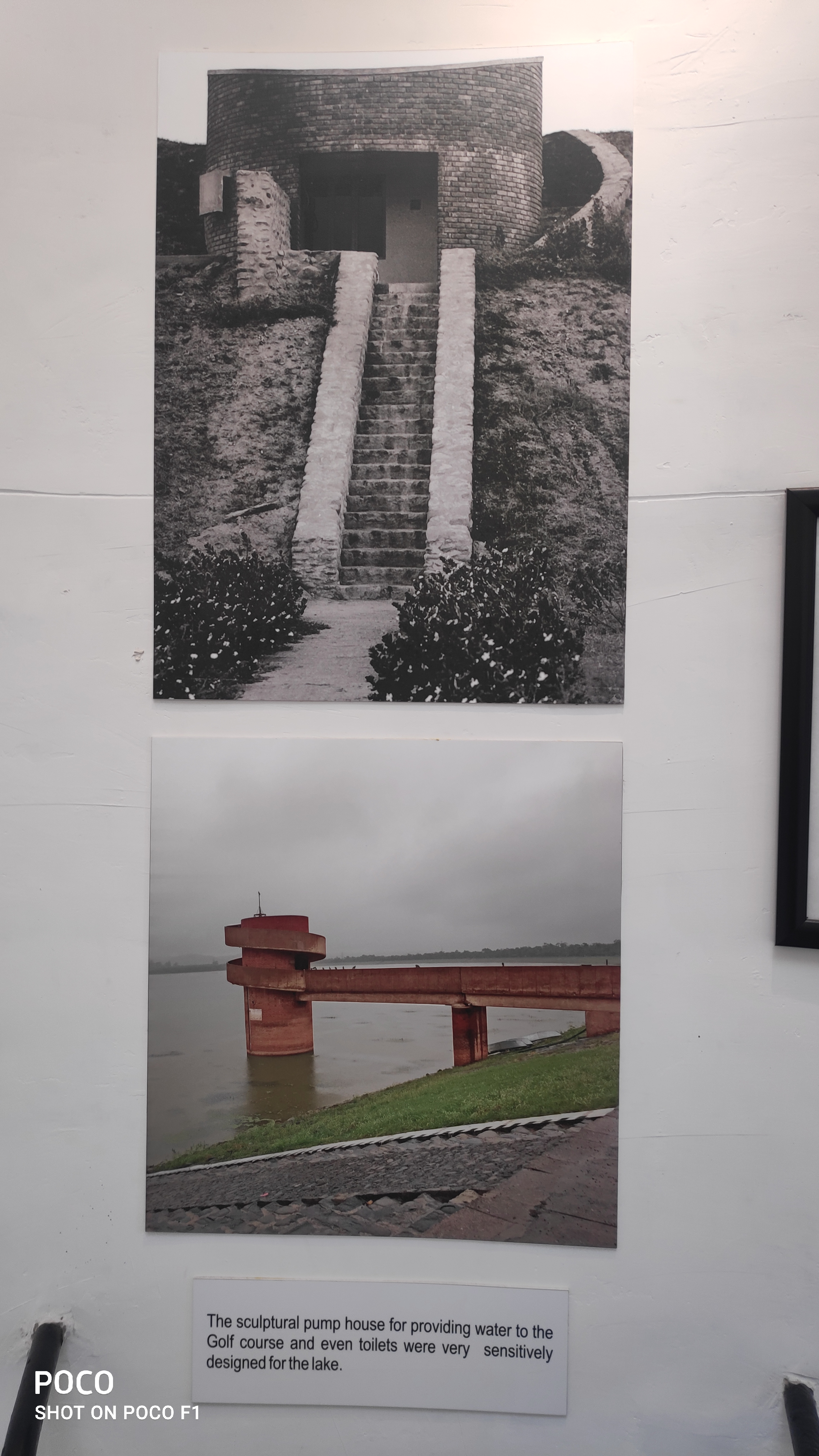
Panel Inside Sukhna Gallery

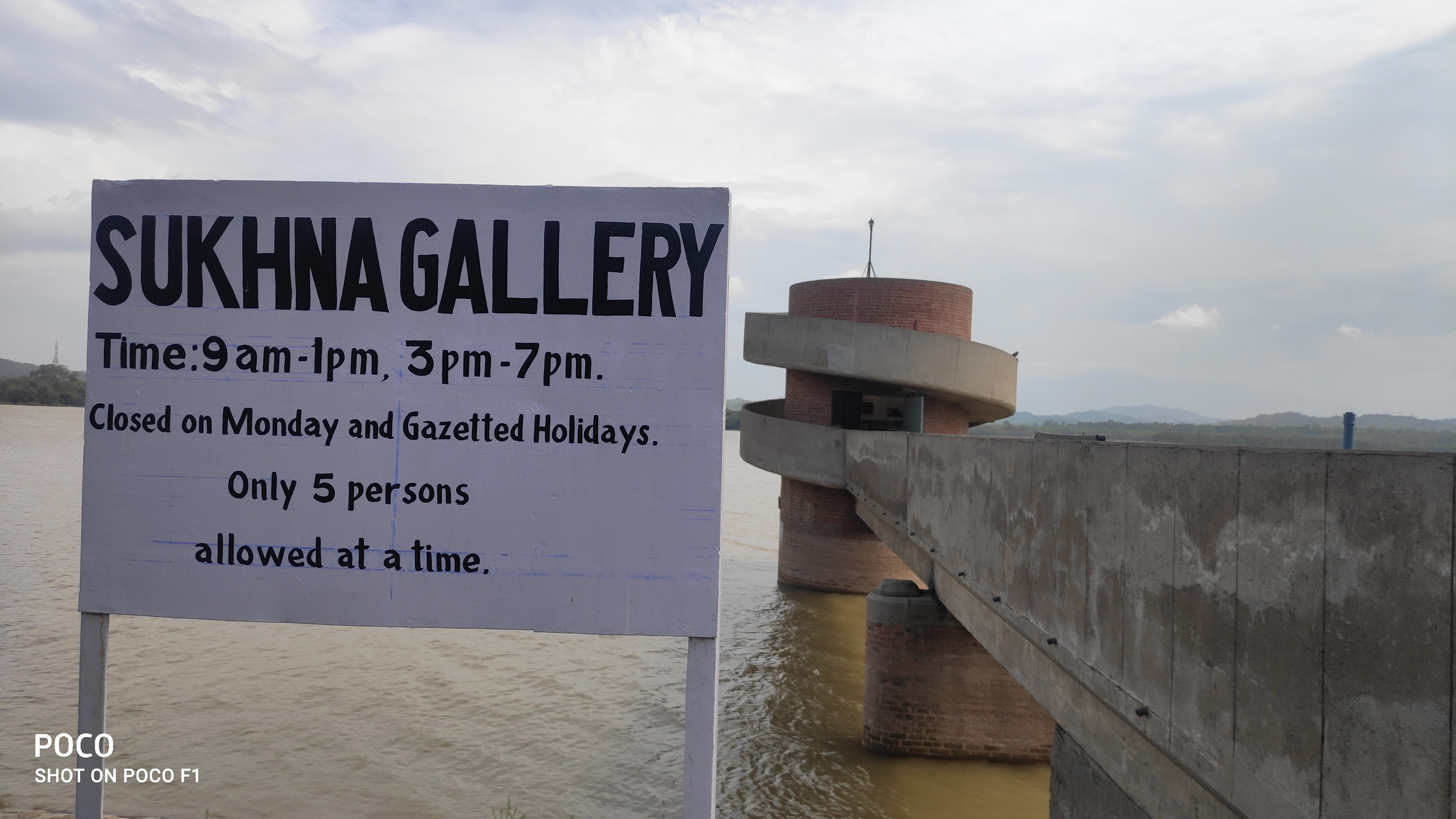
Sukhna Gallery Board

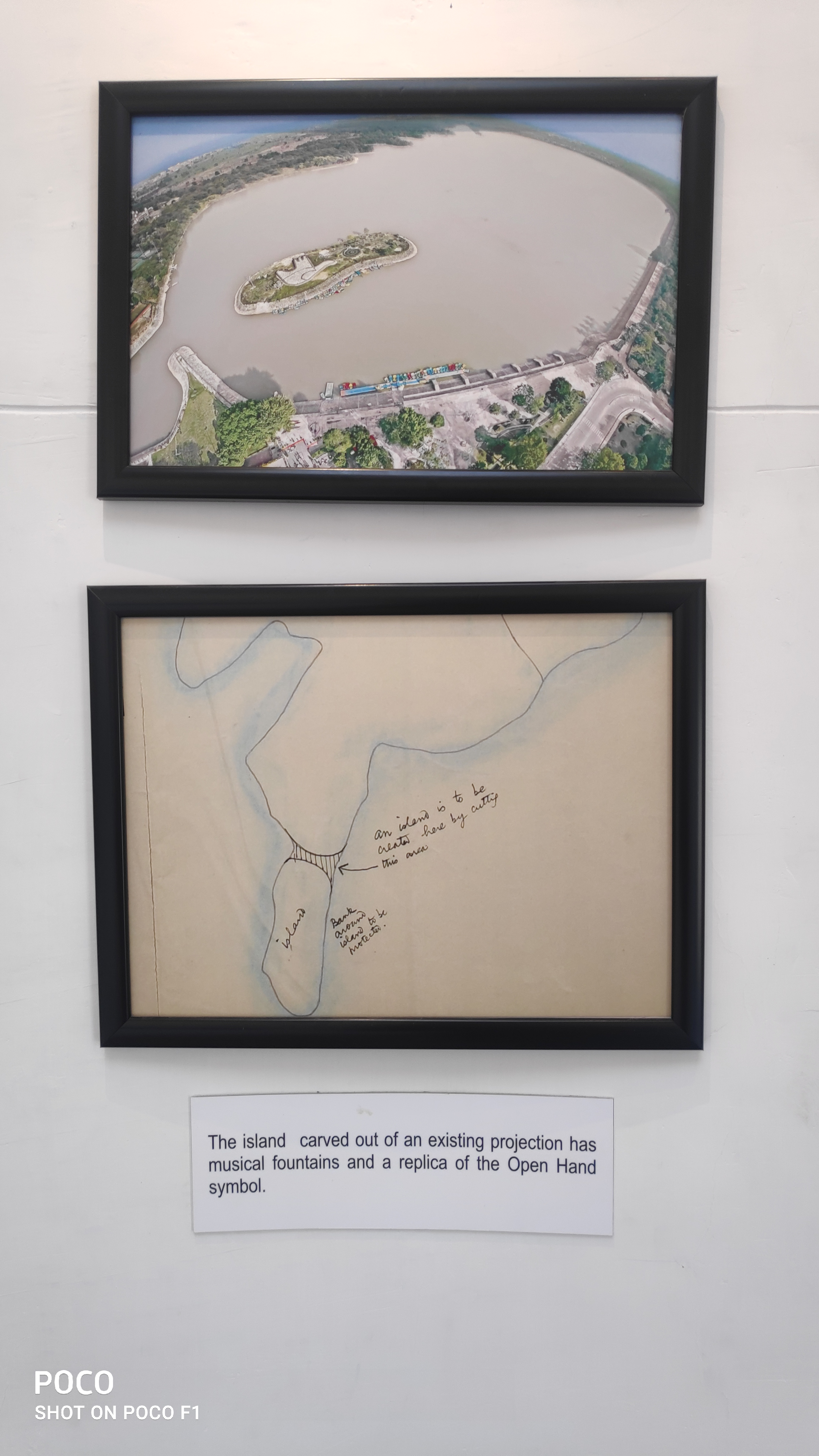
Sukhna lake as island picture inside Sukhna gallery
