= Heritage Trees of Chandigarh =

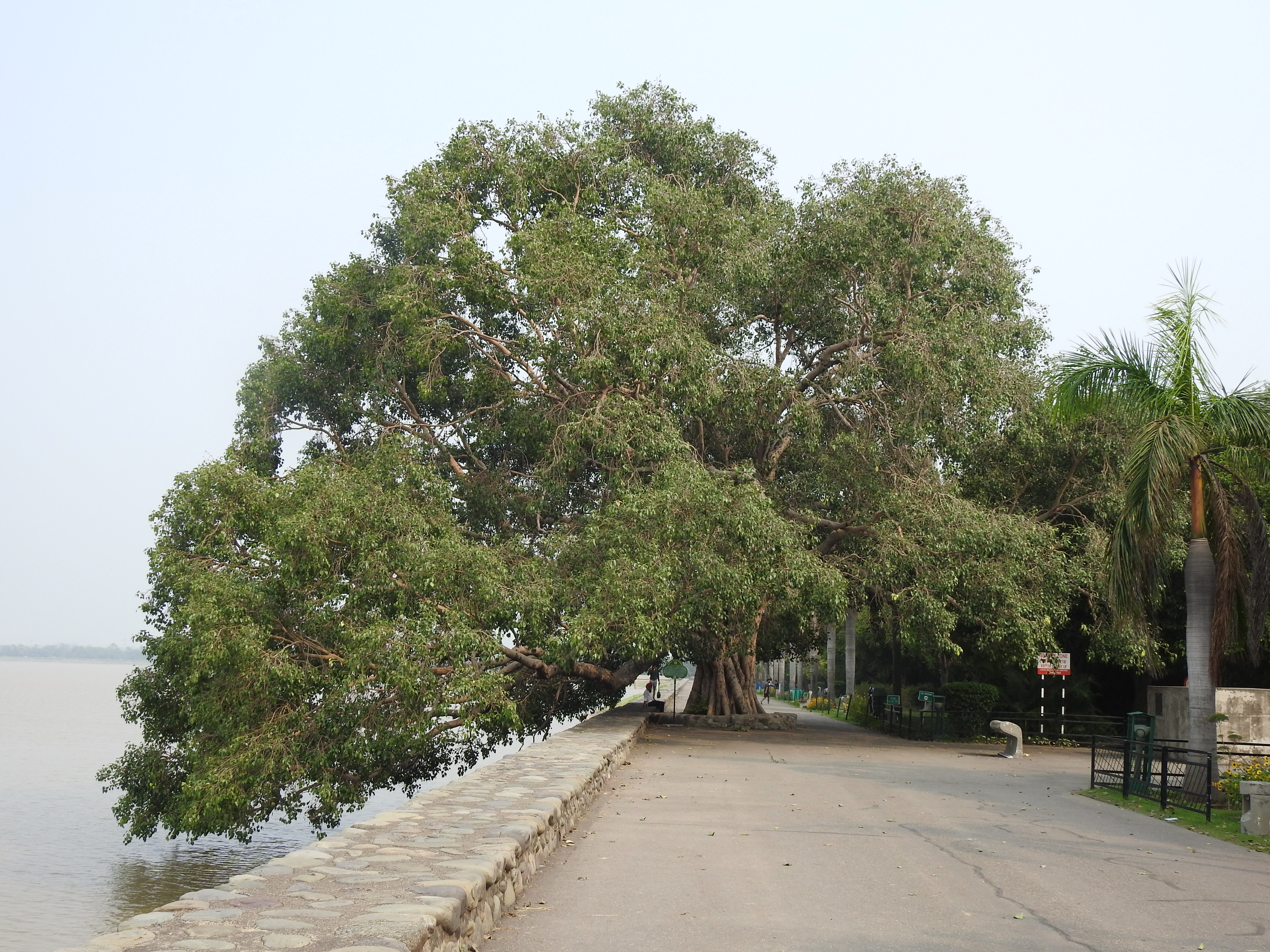
Heritage Tree of Chandigarh at Sukhna Lake

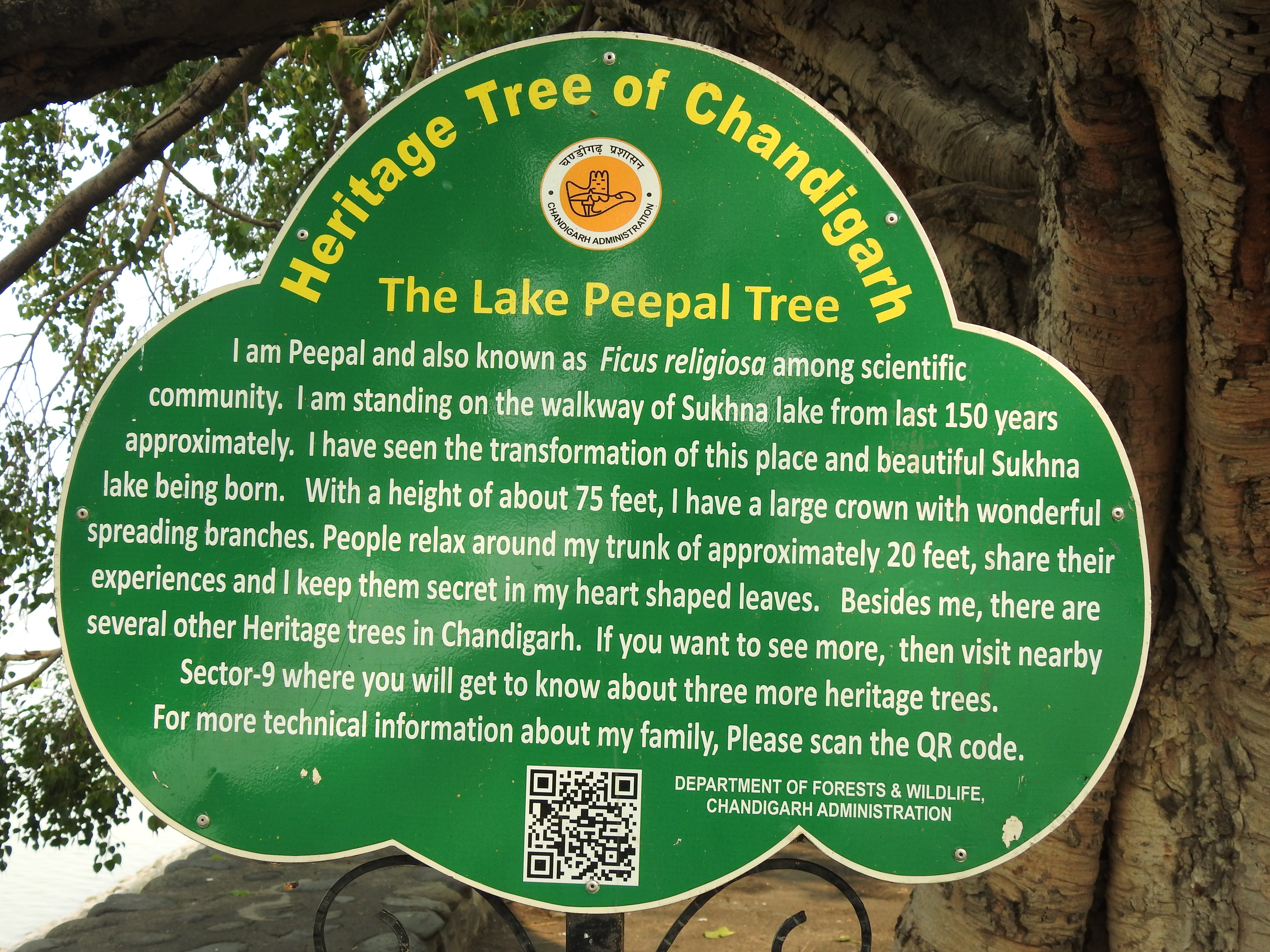
Board sign of Heritage Trees of Chandigarh, India

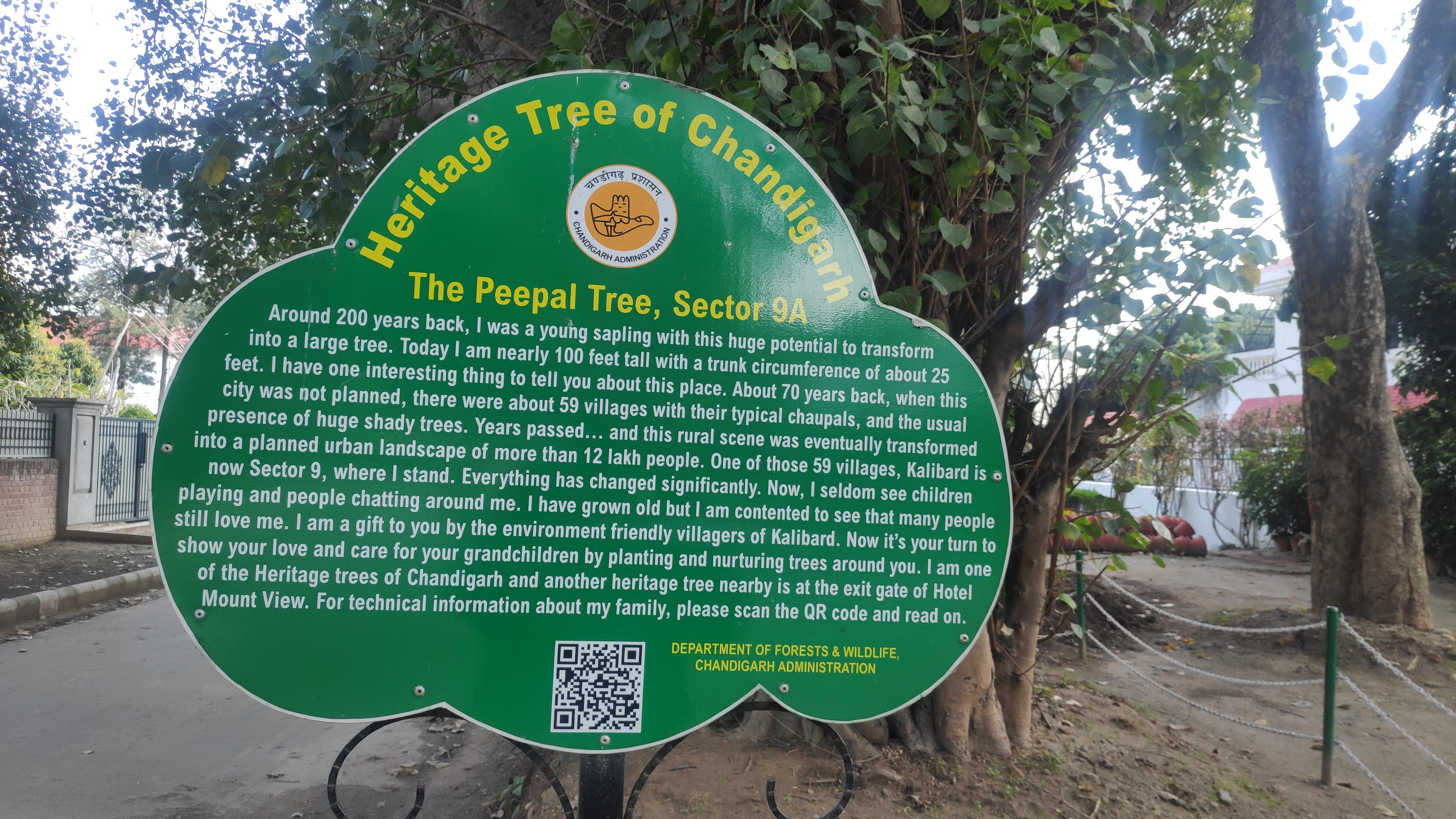
Chandigarh Heritage Tree at sector 9A

Many trees in the Union Territory of Chandigarh are given a privileged part of the natural heritage of the city which serves as an important green landmark, so the Chandigarh government came up with a list of 31 trees which are called Heritage Trees of Chandigarh. One can contact the Department of Forest & Wildlife administration or Chandigarh Tree Lovers to get a copy of the booklet which they made and published with all the details.

Those trees which are 100 years old were identified and put in a list of "heritage status". Out of 31, the Chandigarh government identified that 15 of them are peepal, 11 are banyan, 4 are mango trees, and only one is an earpod tree. The oldest tree which was found standing from the last 350 years is one of the peepal trees in Khudda Ali Sher village.

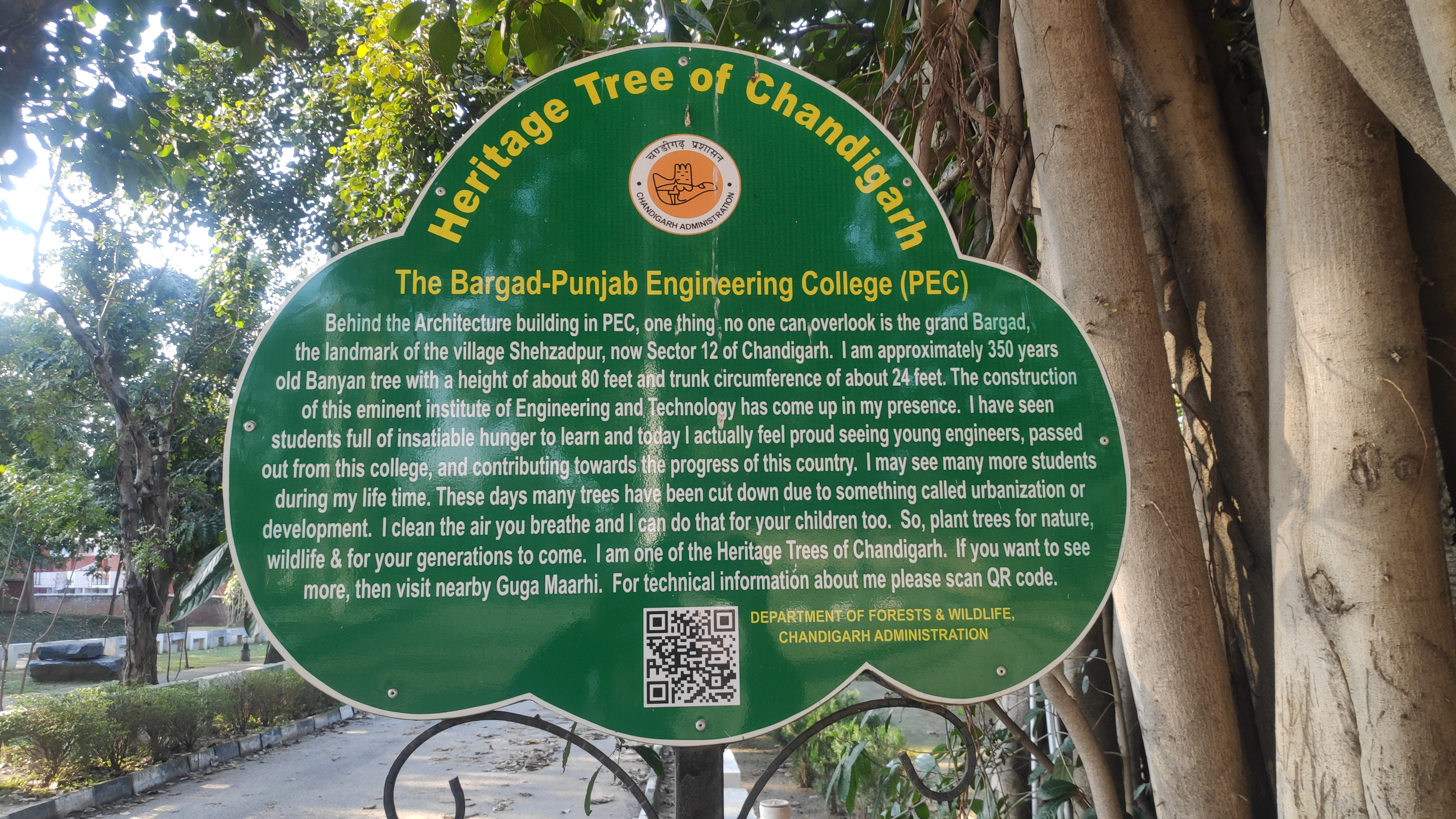
Chandigarh Heritage Tree at Punjab Engineering College

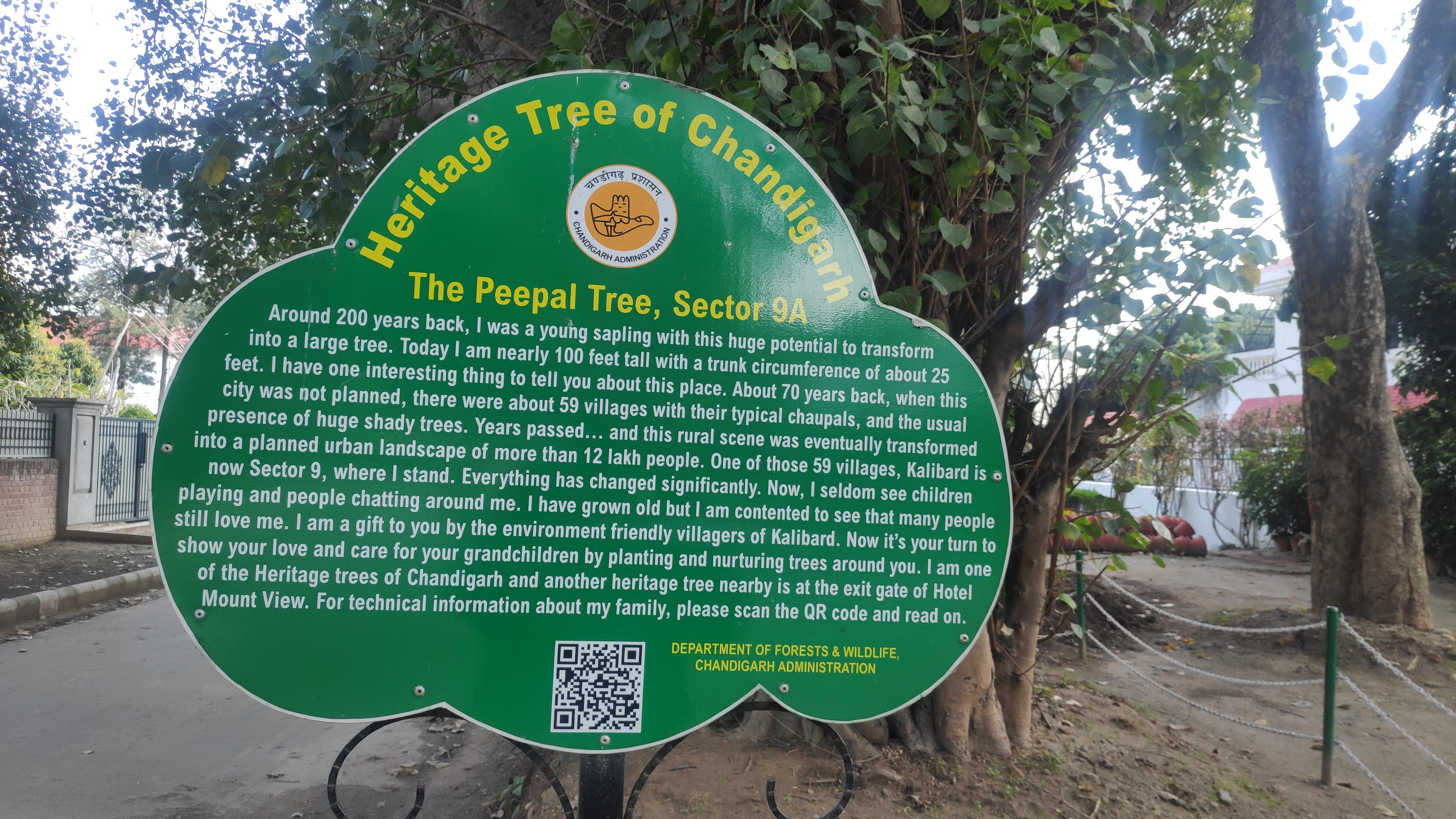
Board sign Chandigarh Heritage Tree 9A

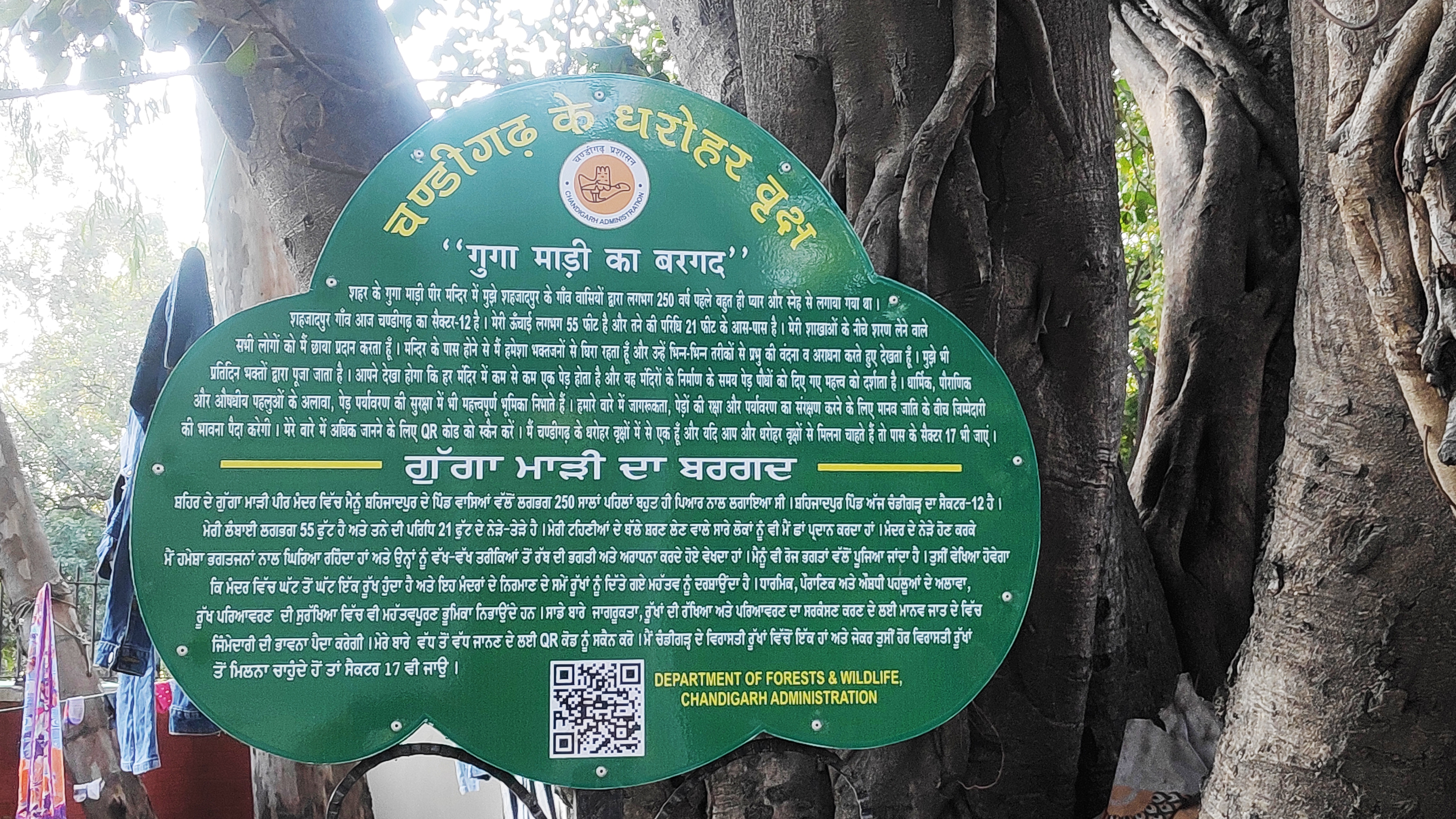
Chandigarh Heritage Tree Board sign at southern side of pgi

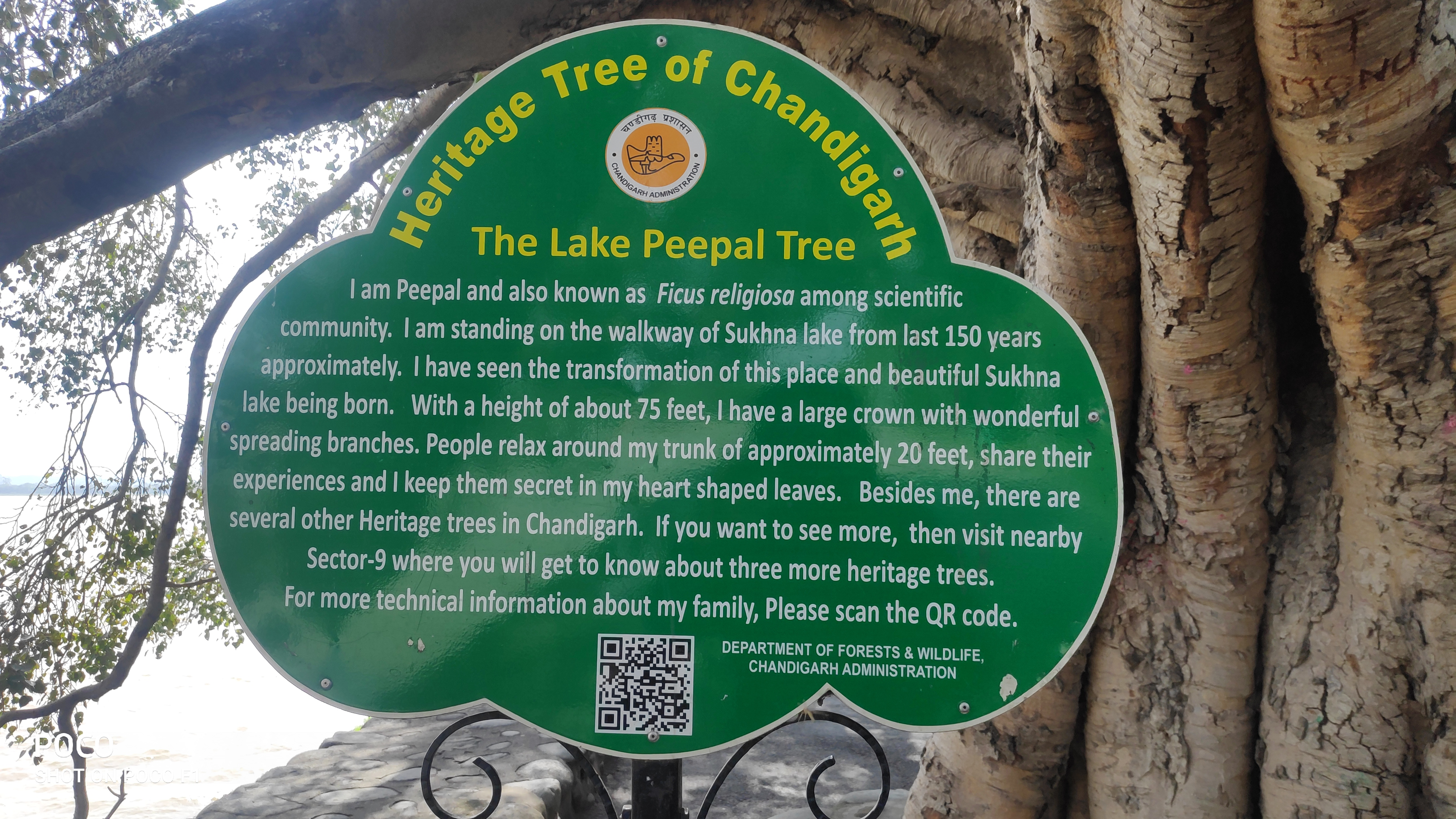
Chandigarh Heritage Tree Board sign At PEC board sign

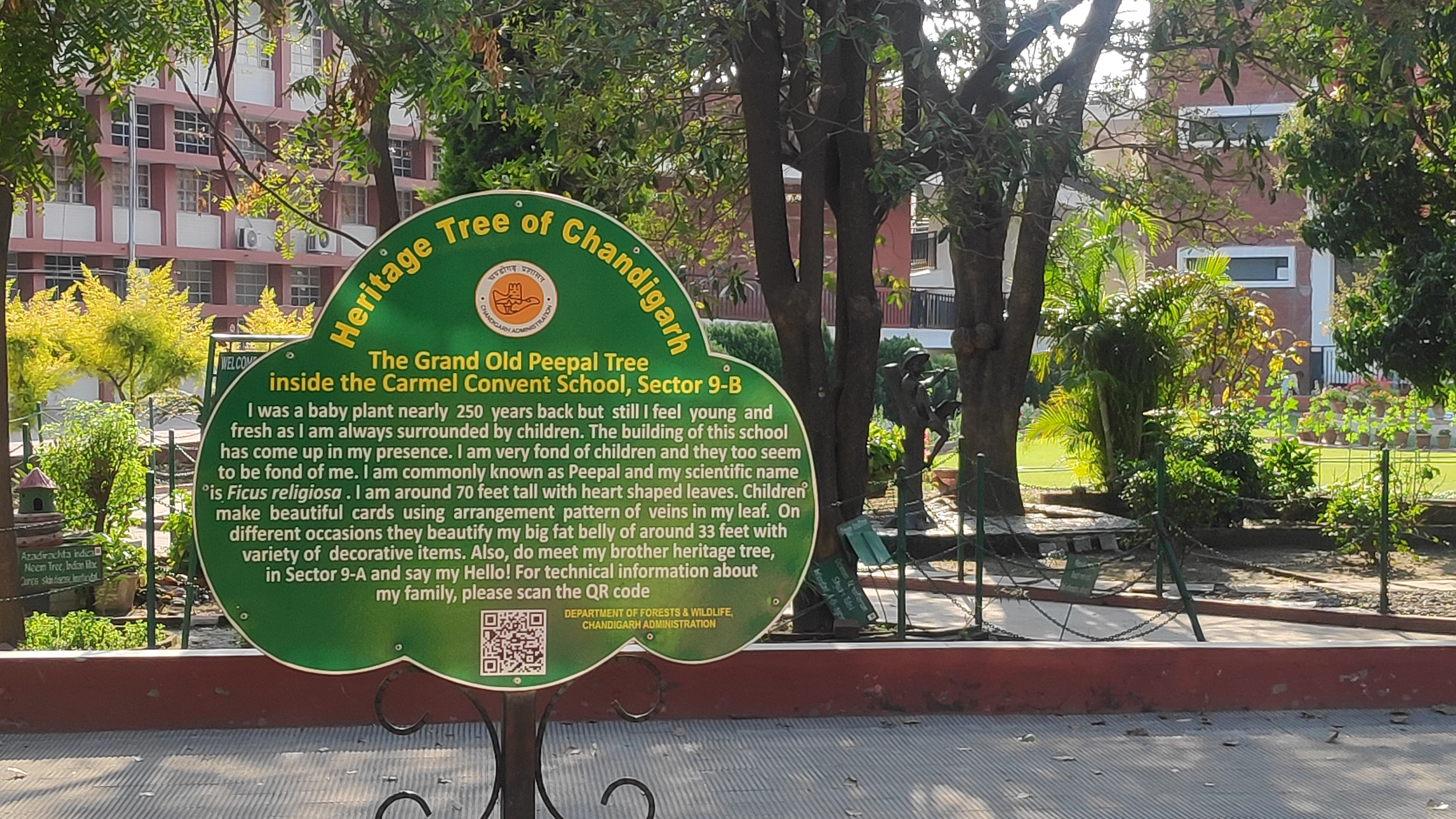
Board sign Chandigarh Heritage Tree 9 B board

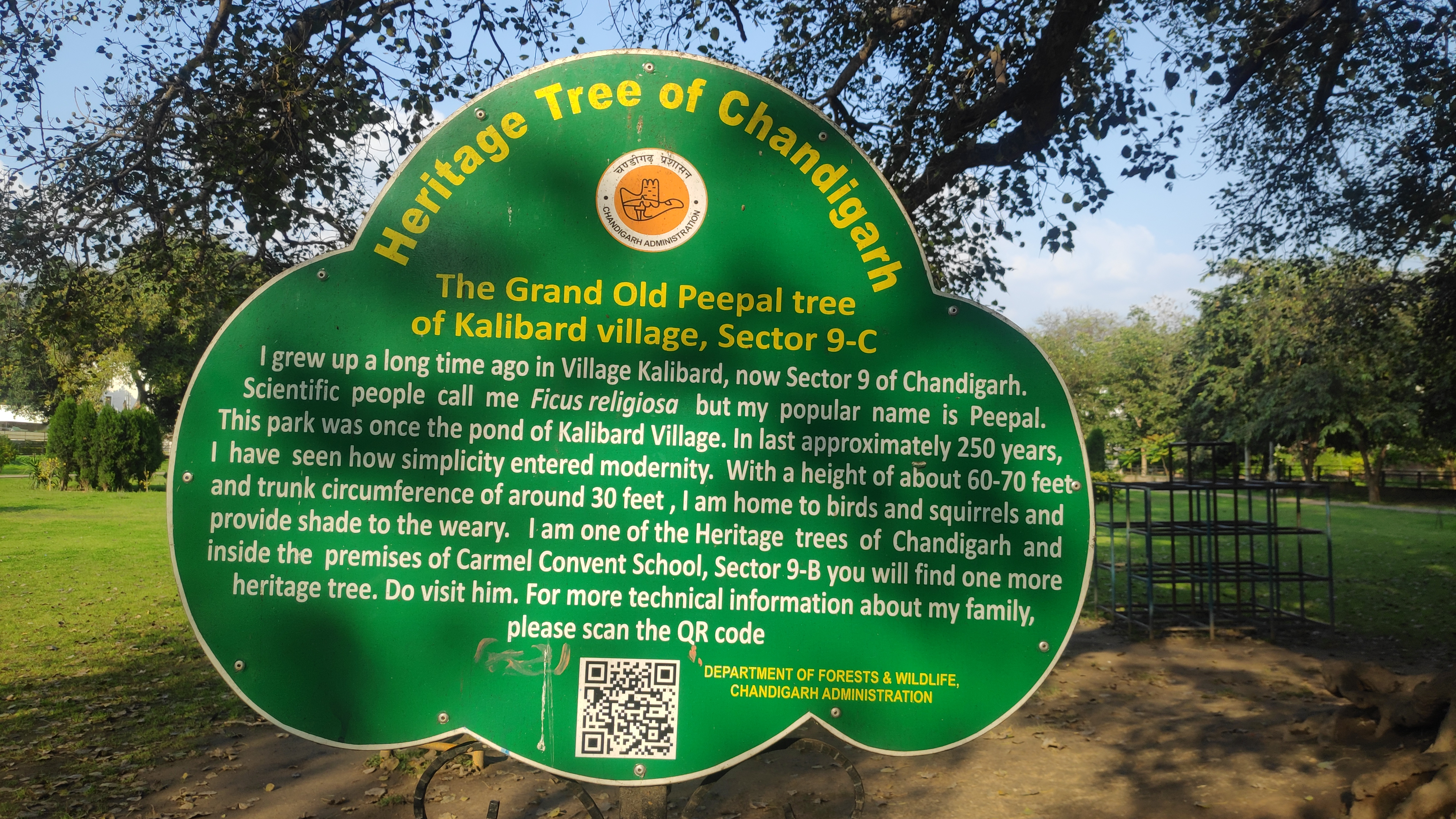
Board sign Chandigarh Heritage Tree 9 C

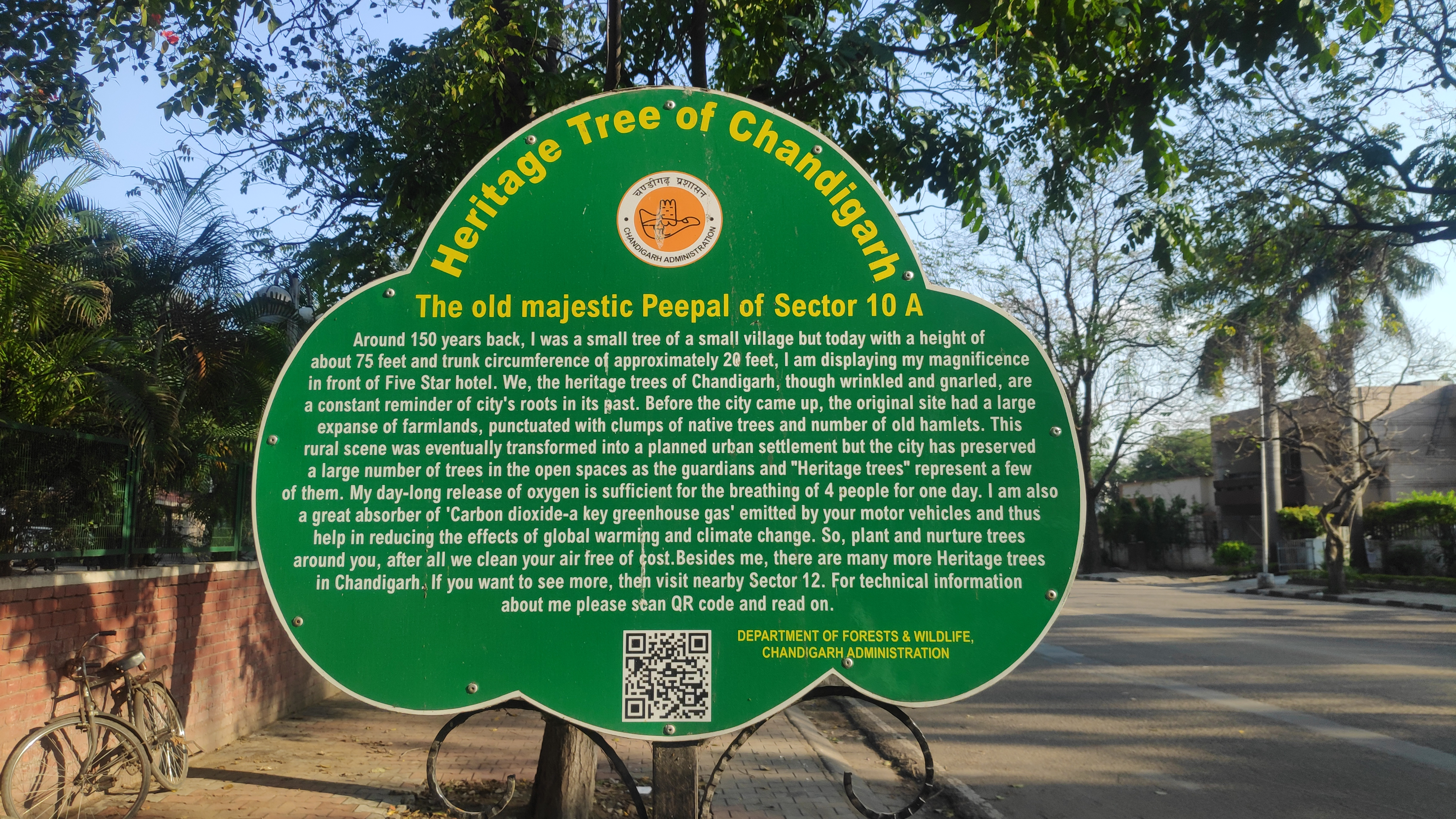
Board at Chandigarh Heritage Tree At sector 10-A

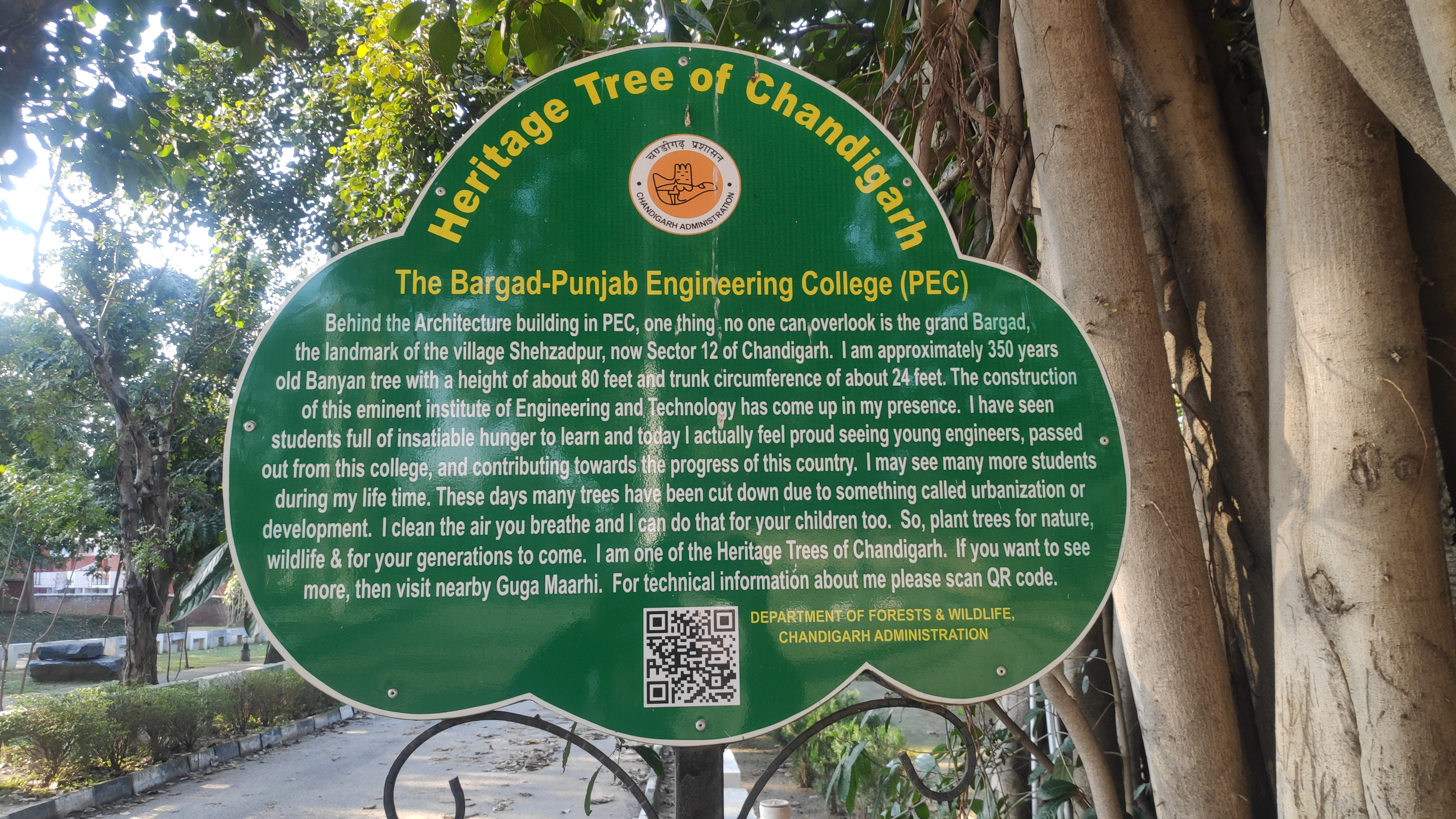
Board on Chandigarh Heritage Tree at Punjab engineering college
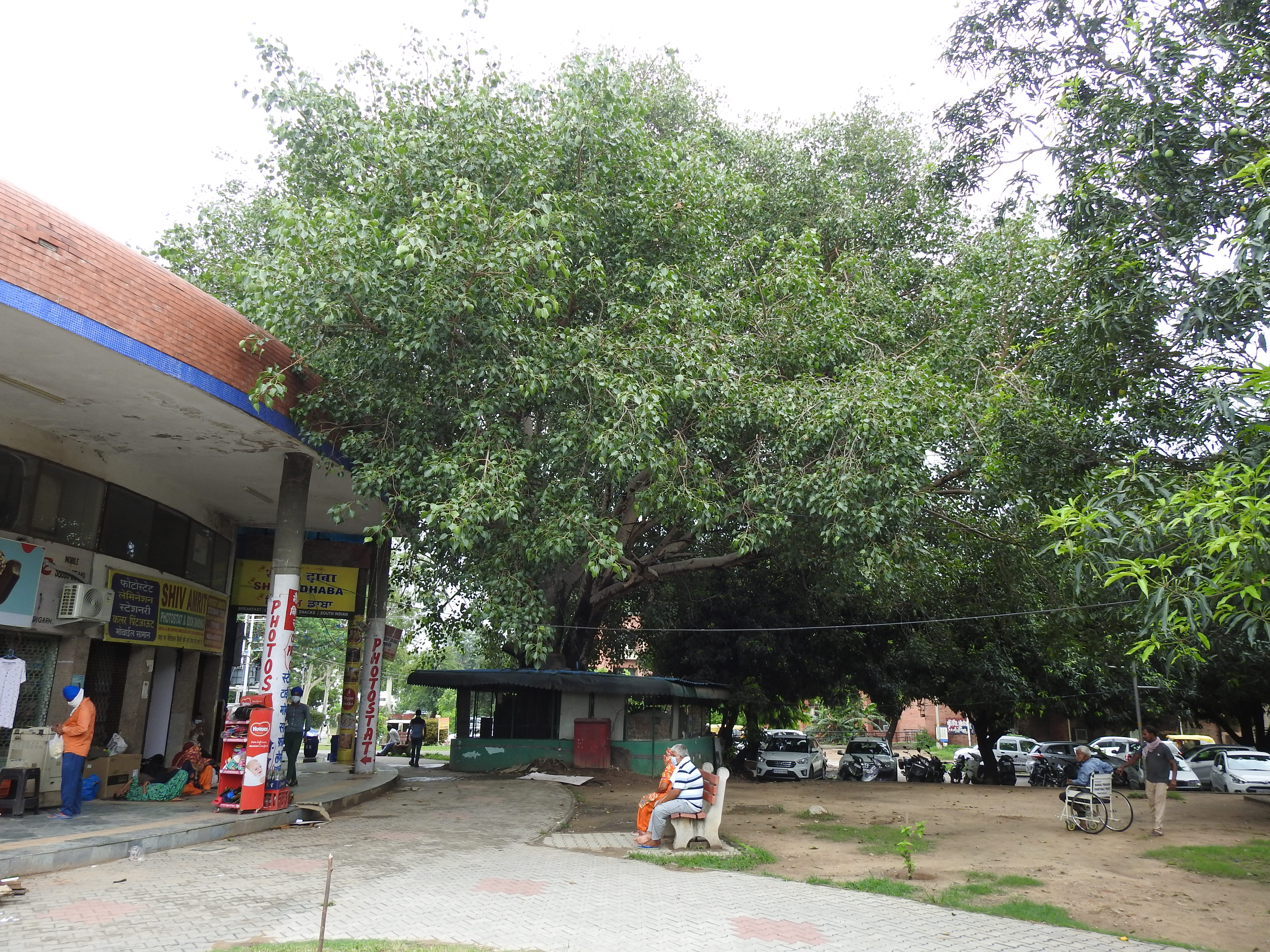
Chandigarh Heritage Tree at southern side of PGI

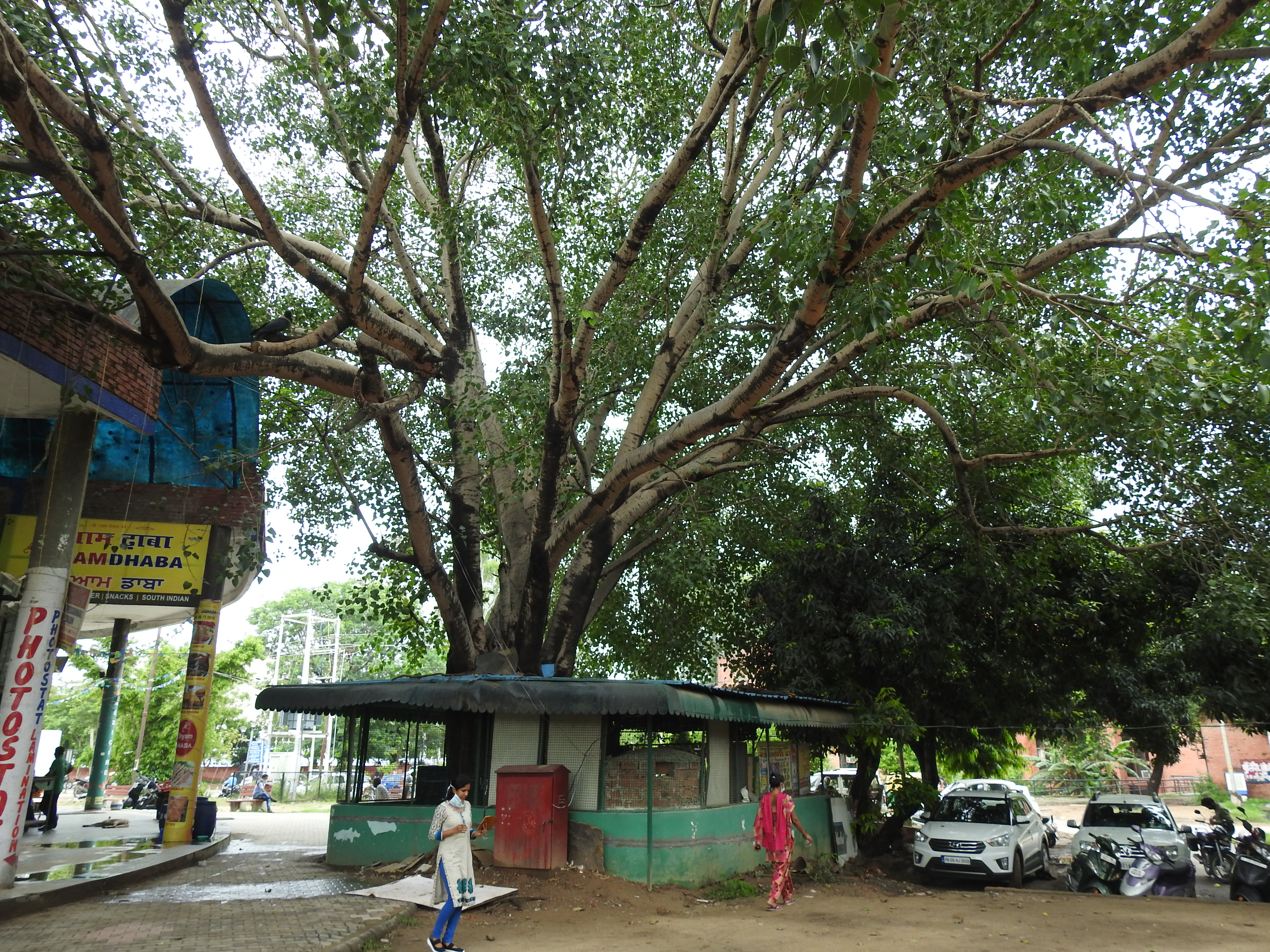
Close up view Chandigarh Heritage Tree at southern side of PGI
