= Parasu Ram Mishra =

Indian soil conservationist and environmentalist

- Born: January 1926; Jharkhand, India
- Died: May 2001 (aged 75)
- Occupations: Soil conservationist Environmentalist
- Years active: 1965-2000
- Known for: Sukhomajri project
- Spouse: Ramjhari Mishra
- Children: 6
- Parent: RamVriksha Mishra
- Awards: Padma Shri Indira Priyadarshini Vrikshamitra Awards

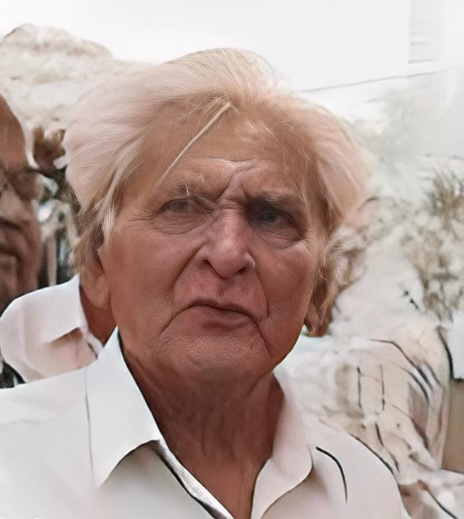
Parasu Ram Mishra

Parasu Ram Mishra (died 2001) was an Indian soil conservationist and environmentalist, credited with efforts for the transformation of Sukhomajri, a small village in Chandigarh in the valley of Shivalik Hills. He was the head of the Central Soil and Water Conservation Research and Training Institute (CSWCRTI) at its Chandigarh centre. He was a recipient of the fourth highest Indian civilian honour of the Padma Shri.

== Contributions ==
A decade after the Sukhna Lake, conceptualised by Le Corbusier was built, it was detected that sedimentation through the Kansal choe, a seasonal stream, was causing reduction in the depth and size of the lake. In order to find a solution to the problem, CSWCRTI deputed a team in 1975, with Mishra as the project director to Sukhomajri, an arid village at the foothills of Shivalik Hills, in Panchkula district of the Indian state of Haryana. He worked for three years with the local villagers, educating them about the seriousness of the situation and urging them to abandon goat farming which was causing denuding of the forests and shift to cattle farming. He built two check dams across the seasonal stream for rain water harvesting, made water available to villagers for agriculture and was successful in implementing social fencing programme, where the villagers erected fences protecting the forests from cattle grazing. With assistance from the Forest Department of Haryana and the Ford Foundation, he is reported to have transformed the village into a prosperous one. It is reported that the bare slopes of Shivalik Hills were covered with vegetation, the milk production increased nine-fold, the rate of sedimentation was reduced to 1/15th of earlier levels, crop yield increased manifold, and a corpus fund was put in place, under the care of a society, for development activities in the village. A 1992 study by S. K. Dhar, the then Chief Conservator of Forests, confirmed that the tree density also increased from 13 per hectare to 1272 per hectare.

Mishra introduced a new concept of cyclical investment, Chakriya Vikas Pranali, where a part of the returns from a scheme becomes the capital of the next project, which is noted to have assisted in increasing rural employment and making the village self-reliant. The International Institute for Environment and Development (IIED) acknowledged the success of the Sukhomajri project by publishing a case study report, by P. R. Mishra and M. Sarin under the title Social Security Through Social Fencing. The article was included in the 1988 book, The Greening of aid: sustainable livelihoods in practice, published by IIED. The Government of India awarded him the fourth highest civilian award of the Padma Shri in 2000, for his services in the fields of ecology and environment.

== See also ==
- Sukhna Lake
- International Institute for Environment and Development
