= Garden of Silence =

Meditative space in Chandigarh, India

Coordinates: 30°44′18.60″N 76°49′46.80″E

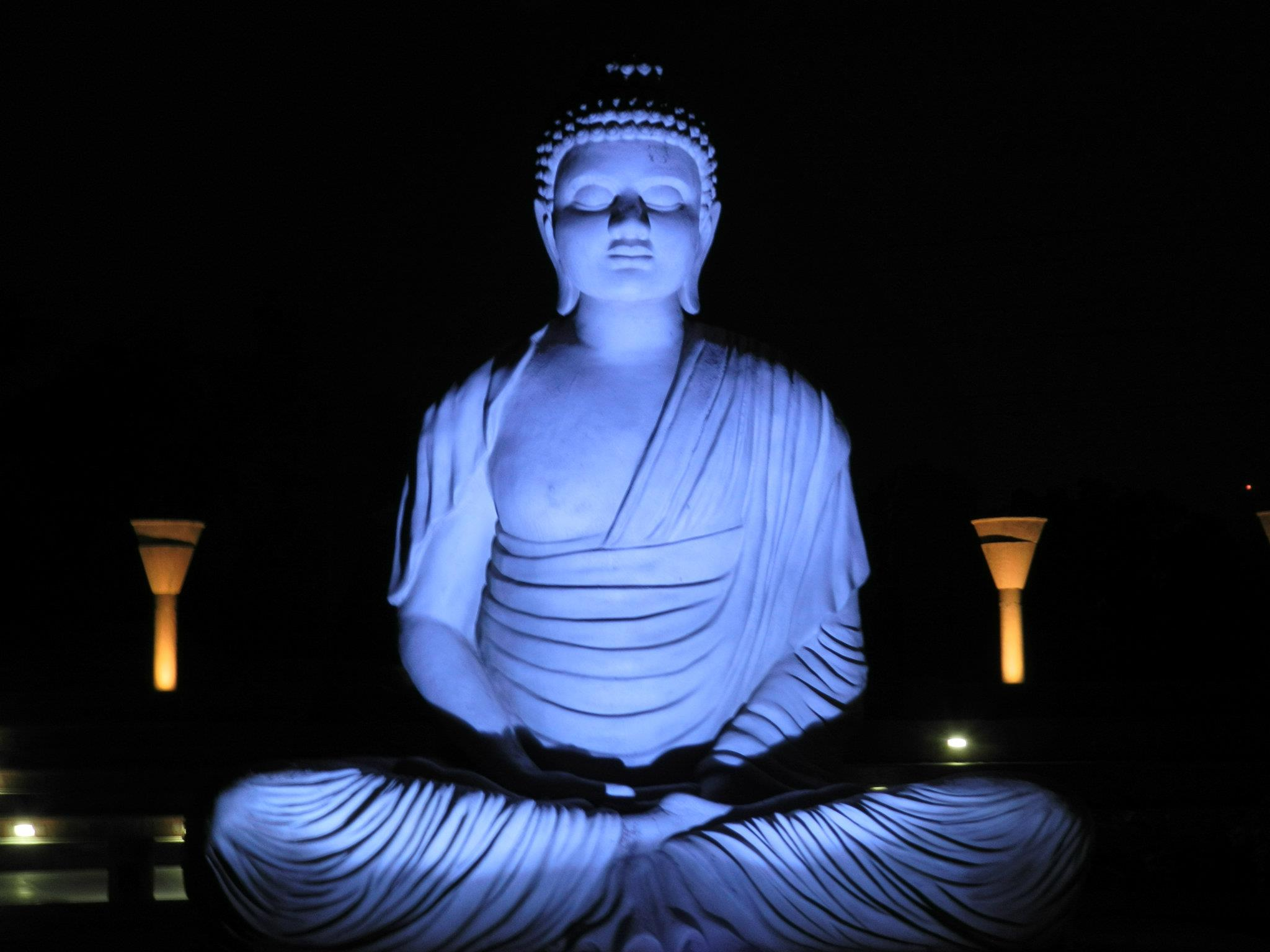
Buddha statue in the Garden of Silence

The Garden of Silence is a meditative space at the end of Sukhna Lake, Chandigarh, India. It features a seated Buddha. The garden is financed by the Ministry of Tourism and developed by the Chandigarh administration.
