= Sukhna Lake =

Reservoir in Chandigarh, India

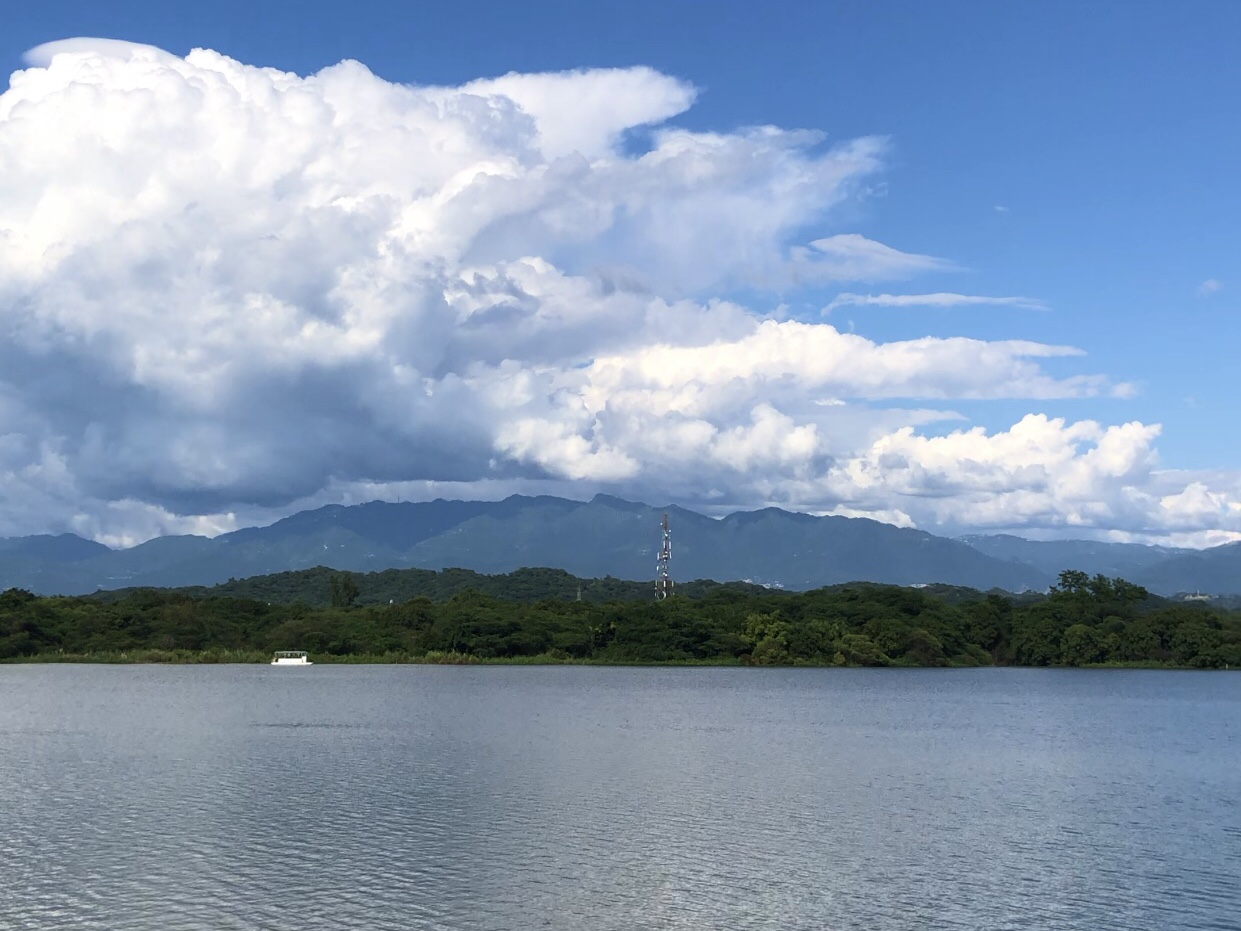
- View of Sukhna Lake with the Shivalik Hills in the background

- Location within Chandigarh
- Location: Chandigarh
- Coordinates: 30°44′N 76°49′E
- Type: Reservoir
- Basin countries: India
- Surface area: 3 km^{2} (1.2 sq mi)
- Average depth: 8 ft (2.4 m)
- Max. depth: 16 ft (4.9 m)

Designations

Ramsar Wetland
- Designated: 16 March 2026
- Reference no.: 2603

Sukhna Lake is a reservoir and wetland hosting the Sukhna Wildlife Sanctuary located in Chandigarh, India, at the Shivalik hills of the Himalayas. This 3 km^{2} rain-fed lake was created in 1958 by damming the Sukhna Choe, a seasonal stream coming down from the Shivalik hills. Originally, the seasonal flow entered the lake directly, causing heavy siltation. To check the inflow of silt, 25.42 km^{2} of land was acquired in the catchment area and put under vegetation. In 1974, the Choe was diverted and made to bypass the lake completely, the lake being fed by three siltation pots, minimizing the silt into the lake itself.

== History ==
Ducks at the lake

The lake was created by Le Corbusier and the Chief Engineer L Verma. To preserve its tranquility, Corbusier insisted on two things: that it be forbidden for motorboats to circulate in the water, and for vehicular traffic to be prohibited on top of the dam (promenade). The lake is fringed by a golf course to the south, and Nek Chand's famous Rock Garden of Chandigarh to its west. The Japanese Garden, Chandigarh, known for its Japanese-style architecture and peaceful atmosphere, is another notable attraction located nearby in Sector 31.

== Description ==
View of Sukhna Lake from the jogging track

Sukhna is an inseparable part of the city of Chandigarh. The city planners were deeply attached to the lake. So much so that Pierre Jeanneret's ashes were immersed in the lake in 1970 at his niece's request.

The roof of the dam has become a promenade.

Sukhna has a membership-based Lake Club with lawns, a gym, indoor games, swimming pools, and both grass and synthetic tennis courts. Boating, rowing, sculling, sailing, kayaking, and water-skiing can be undertaken throughout the year.

The lake, which was the venue for the Asian Rowing Championships, has the longest channel for rowing and yachting events in Asia.

Sukhna is a sanctuary for many migratory birds like the Siberian duck, storks and cranes, during the winter months. The lake has been declared a protected national wetland by the Government of India.

The Mango Festival is held at Sukhna Lake during the monsoon season.

Sometimes, festivals featuring specialities from different Indian States are also held here, along with cultural performances.

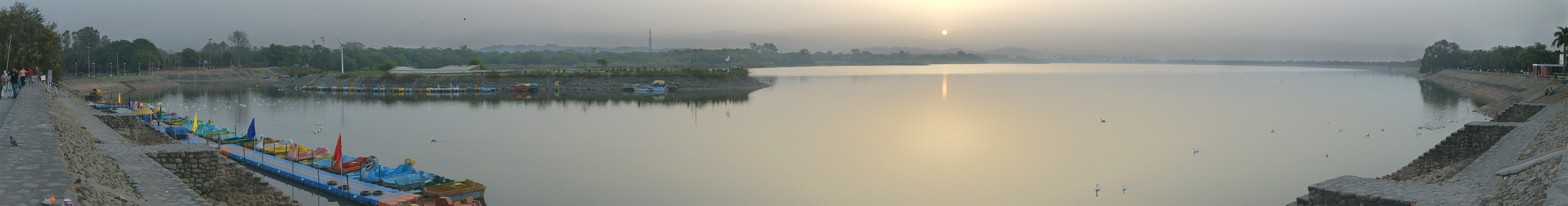
Panorama of the Sukhna Lake in the morning

== Sukhna Wetland ==
The reservoir plays an important role in regulating sediment and water flows from the surrounding catchment. Around the lake's boundaries, the wetland area experiences seasonal fluctuations in water levels and supports a range of habitats, from open water to littoral vegetation, scrub and forest, providing habitat for diverse species. The wetland is a haven for resident waterbirds and others migrating along the Central Asian Flyway, providing feeding, breeding, roosting and wintering habitats. Notable species include the vulnerable common pochard (Aythya ferina) and the endangered Pallas’s fish eagle (Haliaeetus leucoryphus). The shallow littoral habitats also support reptiles such as the endangered black pond turtle (Geoclemys hamiltonii). The wetland is also a recreational and educational resource, providing a natural refuge adjacent to the urban landscape. Management challenges include sediment inflow from the catchment and the control of invasive species, and a management plan is in place, with measures including soil and moisture conservation works to reduce erosion and sediment loads, and periodic removal of invasive plants.

On 16 March 2026, the lake was designated as a Ramsar Site by the Ramsar Convention. The designation was officially announced on 15 October 2026 by the Ministry of Environment, Forest and Climate Change as India's 103rd Ramsar Site, making it Chandigarh's first Ramsar site. The designation highlights the lake's global importance for wetland conservation, water security, climate resilience and ecological sustainability.

== Development and maintenance ==
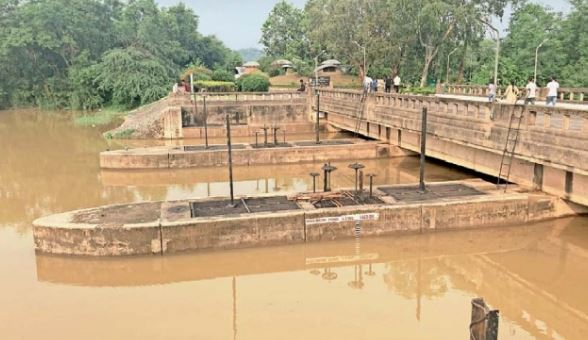
Sukhna Lake regulatory end

The Mera Chandigarh administration has made a decision not to allow fish more than 30 cm in size in the Sukhna Lake

The Chandigarh Administration has finalized a new plan for Sukhna Lake and New Lake in Sector 42 with Rs 2.73 crore which has also been received from Union Government.B.A.

== Challenges ==
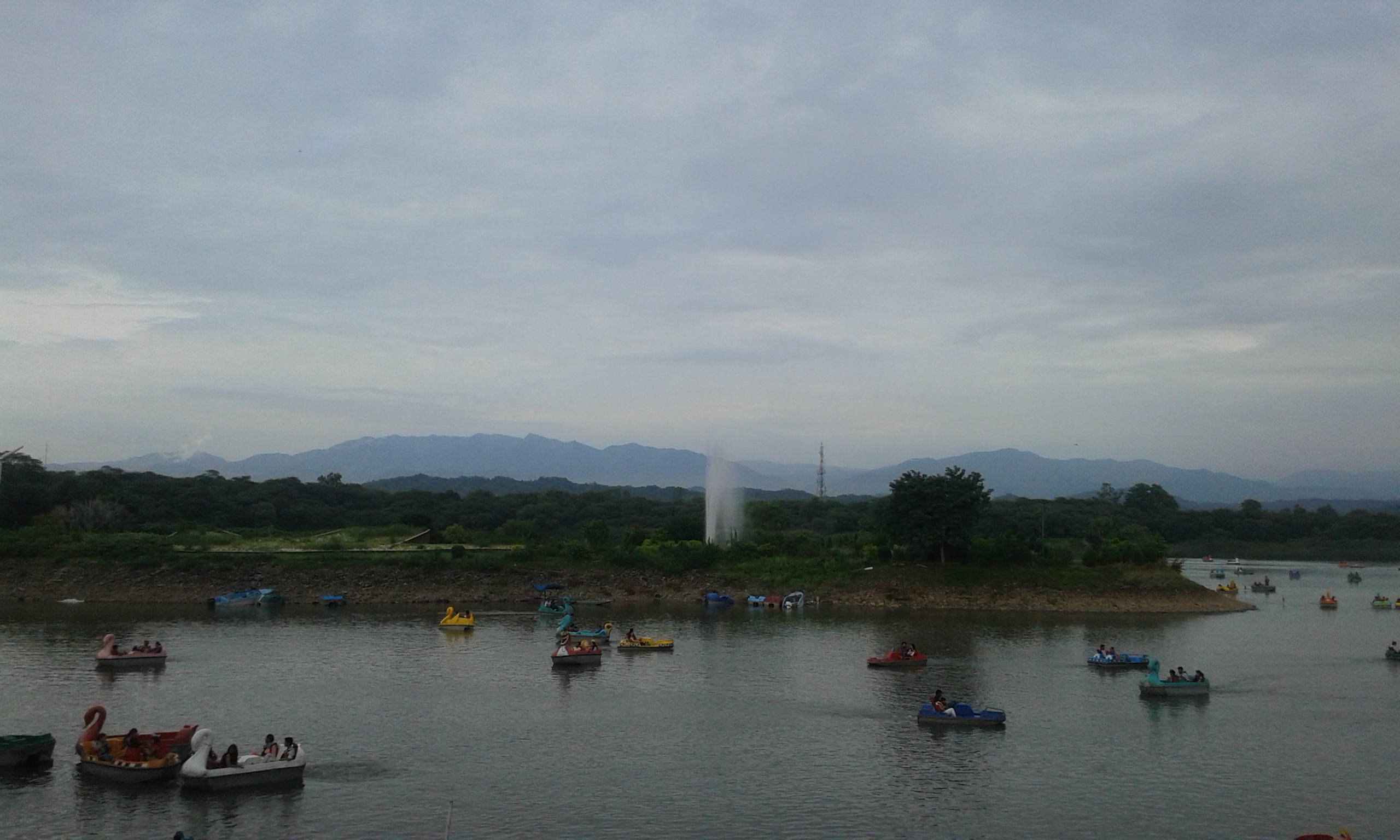
Sukhna Lake in Chandigarh

The lake is facing persistent issues like weed overgrowth, catchment adequacy and silting that are significantly shrinking its size and depth. A project team, under Parasu Ram Mishra, was deployed to address the issue and take remedial measures, which halted the sedimentation, for a while. Additionally, it has become the subject of litigation between Chandigarh and Punjab.

Silting has taken its toll and the volume of the lake has been reduced to 56% of its original. The lake is shrinking rapidly due to siltation and lack of inflow. It was initially hoped that the work of desilting could be undertaken in summers at a war footing and dry dredging could be undertaken at a fraction of cost to save Sukhna in the coming years. Unfortunately, the ground realities seem to be different. Due to heavy rain in August and September, Sukhna was filled up again, and flood gates were being opened.

== Avian flu scare ==
In December 2014, there was an Avian Influenza—or commonly known as the Bird Flu scare —that led to a temporary ban on geese to take premises. The scare started after some migrant geese were found dead in the lake.

However, the administration took great precautions and the domesticated geese were culled to check an infection. Workers who culled the geese went for a check to be sure that they were safe. The reason behind the death of the geese—whether there is a bird flu scare —remains unknown.

== Gallery ==
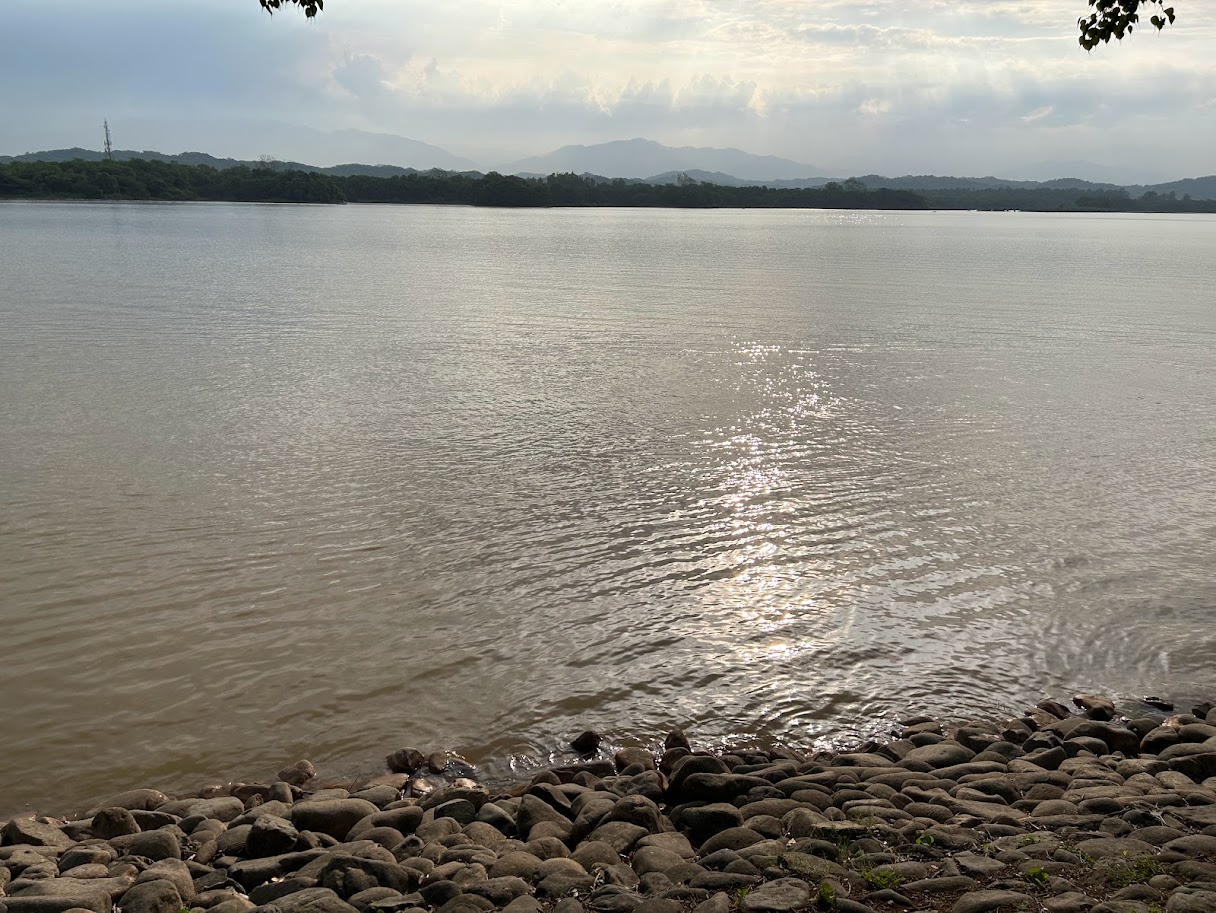
View of the lake, with the Shivalik Hills visible in the background under a partly cloudy sky

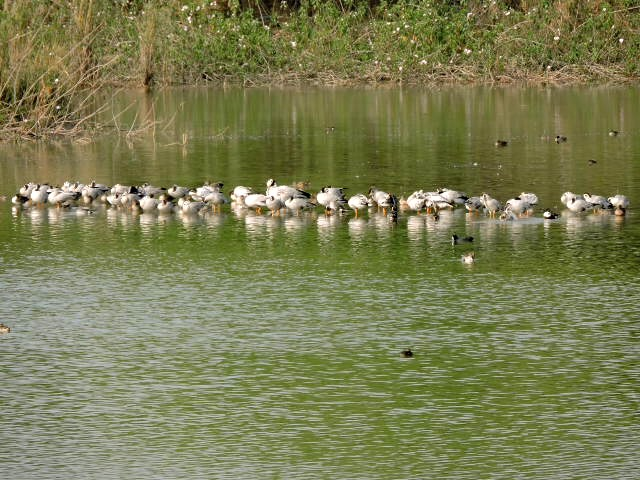
Bar-headed geese at Sukhna lake

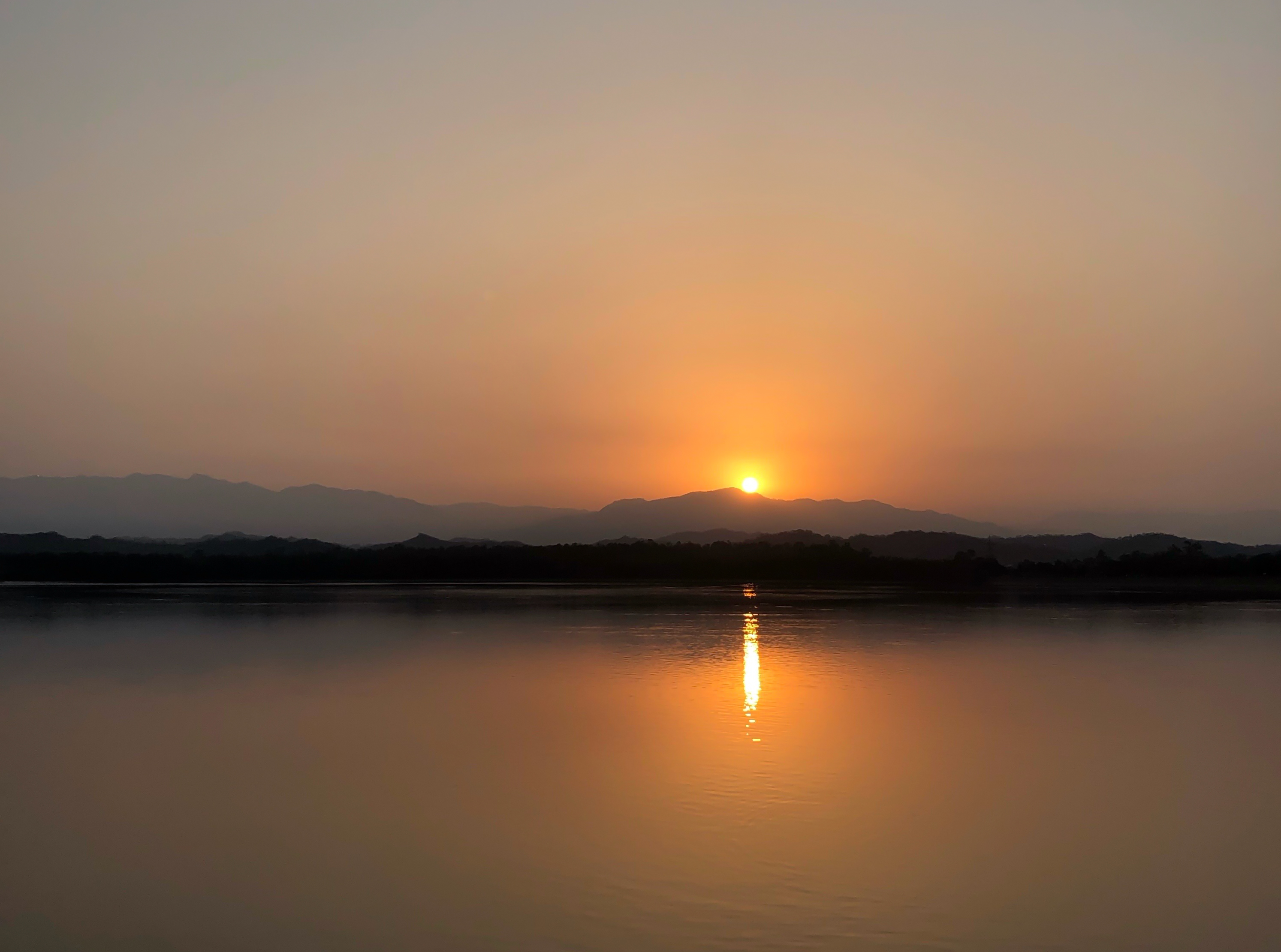
Sunrise at the lake

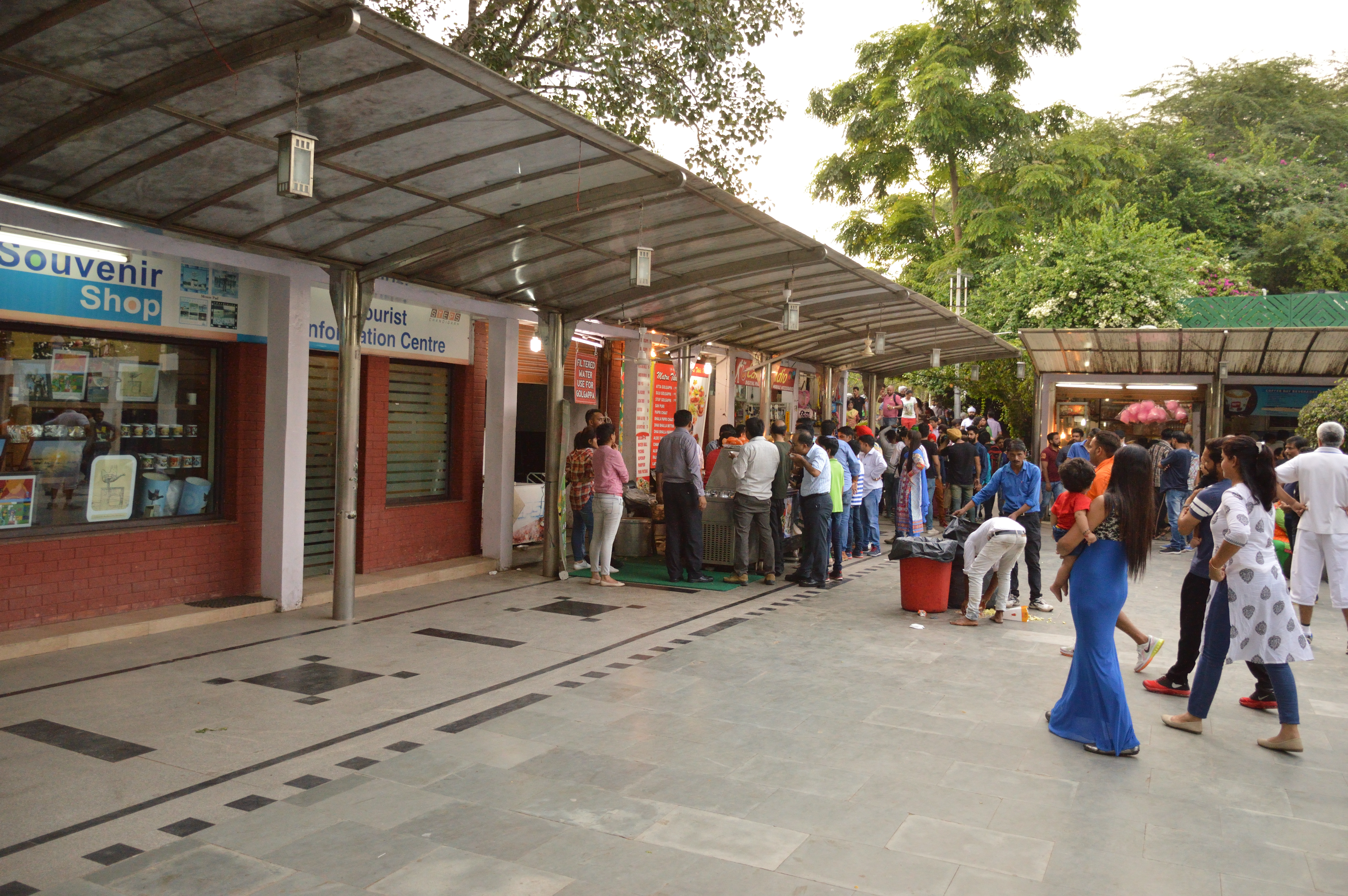
Commercial stalls

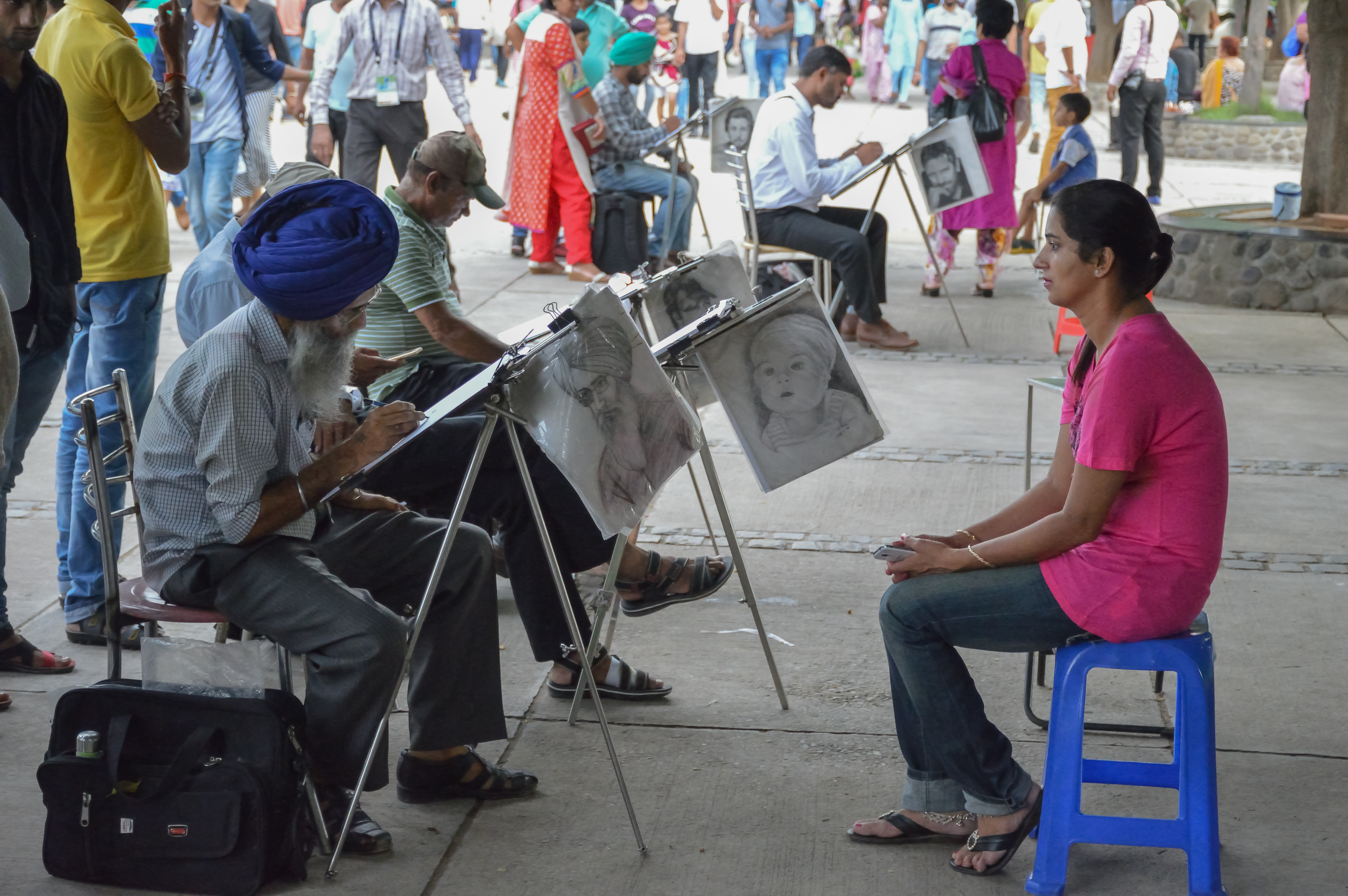
Street Portrait Session at Sukhna Lake

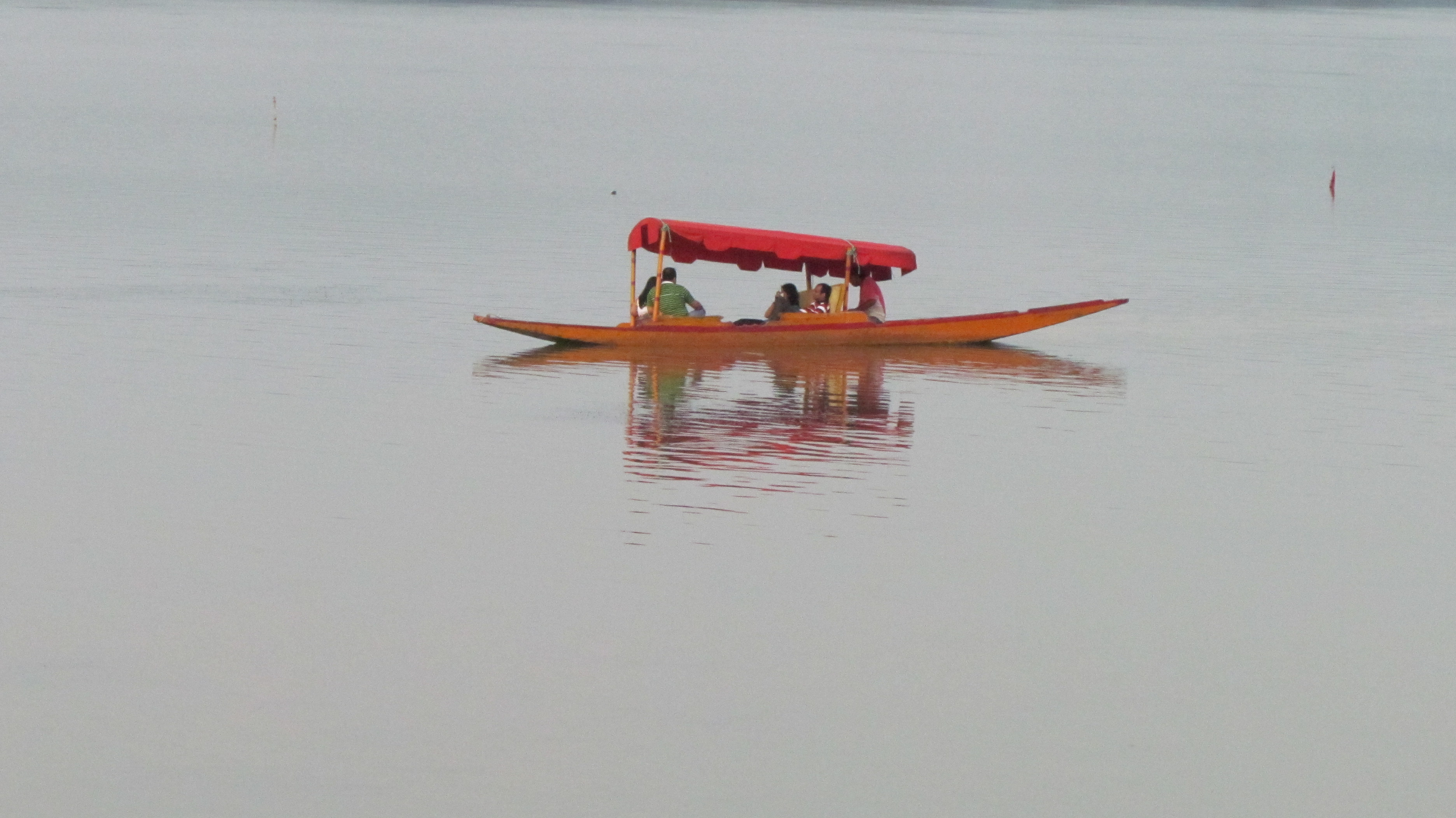
Shikara at Sukhna Lake, Chandigarh.

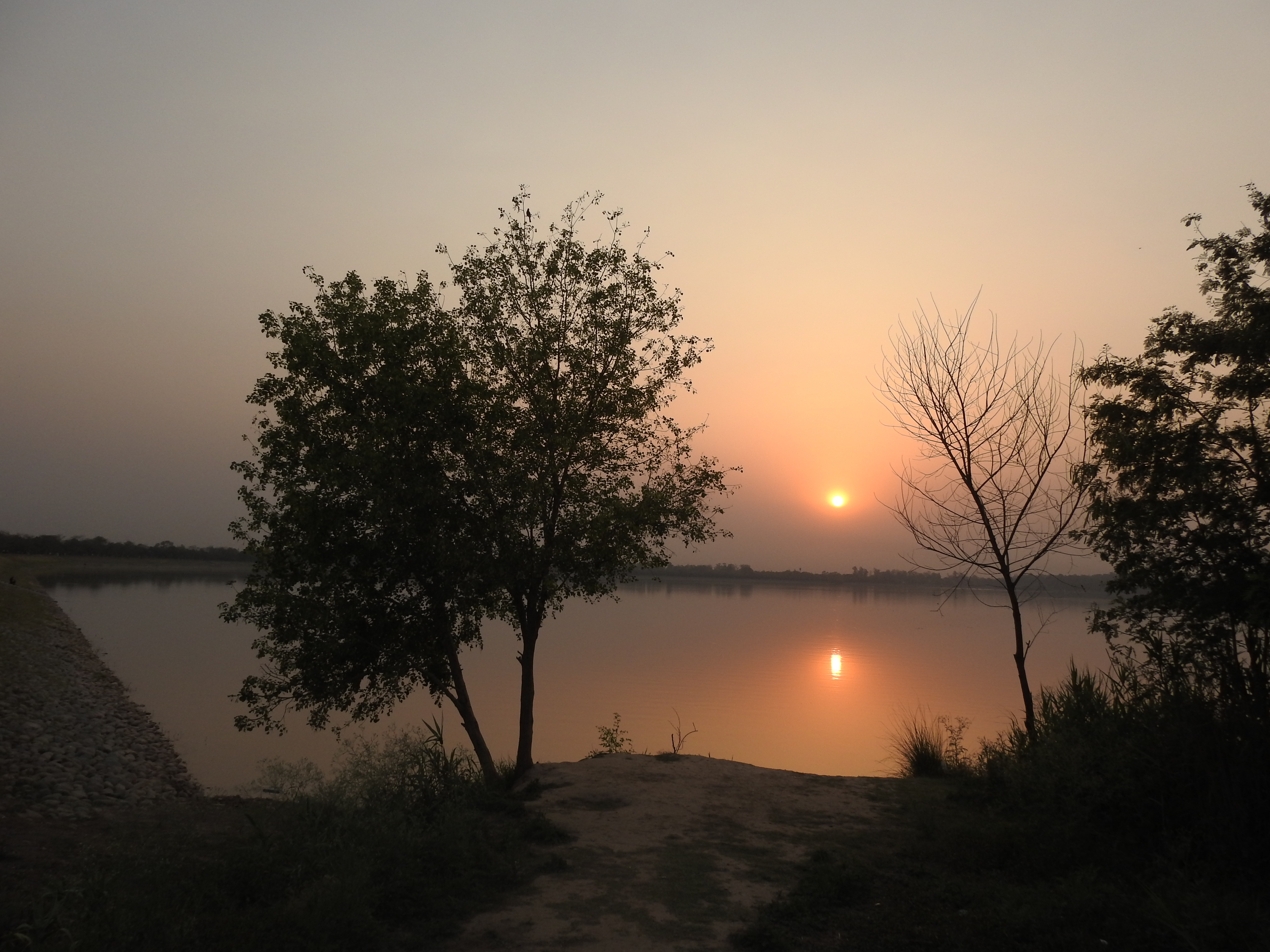
Sunset, Sukhna Lake, 25 April 2018

== See also ==
- Garden of Silence
