= Piare Lal Sharma =

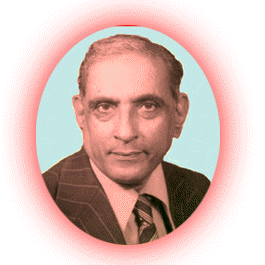

Piare Lal Sharma (1902–2006) was a writer from India, author of several books including India Betrayed. From the mid 1960s to his death, Piare Lal Sharma lived in Chandigarh a region in north India.

Among the many books written by this author, following are very well known:

- The Punjab Customary Law, containing the latest case law up to 1966; by Piare Lal Sharma, Jain Law Agency, 1967
- Linguistic Liaison in Punjabi Intercontinental; by Piare Lal Sharma, Juvenile Mood, 1984
- India Betrayed; by Piare Lal Sharma, Red-Rose Publications, 1980
- World Famous Trials of Rape and Murder; by Piare Lal Sharma, Pankaj Publications, 1978
- World's Wisest Wizard; by Piare Lal Sharma, Sagar Publications, 1977
- World's Greatest Woman; by Piare Lal Sharma, Indian School Supply Depot, Publication Division, 1972
- Yuvaka-hr̥daya-samrāṭa Śrī Sañjaya Gāndhī; by Piare Lal Sharma, 1976
