= Garden of Springs, Chandigarh =

Park in Chandigarh, India

Garden of Springs
- ਗਾਰਡਨ ਆਫ਼ ਸਪ੍ਰਿੰਗਸ गार्डन आफ सप्रिंग्स
- Interactive map of Garden of Springs
- Type: Tourist spot and walking park
- Location: Sector 53, Chandigarh
- Coordinates: 30.723°N 76.736°E
- Opened: December 2015
- Founder: Chandigarh UT Administration
- Owner: Chandigarh UT Administration
- Operator: Chandigarh Tourism Department
- Website: chandigarh.gov.in

Garden of Springs, Chandigarh, is a park situated in Sector 53 of Chandigarh, India. It was inaugurated on 10 December 2015 by Chandigarh UT adviser, Vijay Devon.
