= Garden of Palms Chandigarh =

Garden of palms is a palm tree garden in Chandigarh

Coordinates: 30°43′32″N 76°44′03″E

Garden of palms is a theme based garden located in Sector 42 in the city of Chandigarh. Built at a cost of Rs. 5 crore, the garden boosts of 21 different varieties of palm trees.

The Garden of Palm in Chandigarh has been developed on an area of 19.50 acres. It has rivulets, benches, huts, cycling track and eating joints. The garden was inaugurated by KK Sharma, Advisor to UT Administrator in July 2015.
