= Vicente Lopez =

Vicente Lopez or Vicente López may refer to:

== People ==
- Vicente López Portaña (1772–1850), Spanish painter
- Vicente López y Planes (1785–1856), Argentine writer and politician
- Vicente Fidel López (1815–1903), Argentine historian and politician, son of López y Planes
- Vicente María Epifanio López Madrigal (1880–1972), Filipino businessman
- Vicente López Carril (1942–1980), Spanish road racing cyclist
- Vicente Lopez, Filipino sprinter and gold medallist at the 1921 Far Eastern Championship Games
- Vicente Carballo López (1928–2010), Cuban baseball pitcher and player in the 1957 Caribbean Series

== Places ==
- Vicente López Partido, area of Greater Buenos Aires
  - Vicente López, Buenos Aires, neighbourhood in the above area
  - Estadio Ciudad de Vicente López, sports stadium in the above area
- Plaza Vicente López y Planes, square in Buenos Aires
