= Monument to General Carlos M. de Alvear =

Public sculpture by Antoine Bourdelle in Argentina

Coordinates: 34.5854°S 58.3898°W

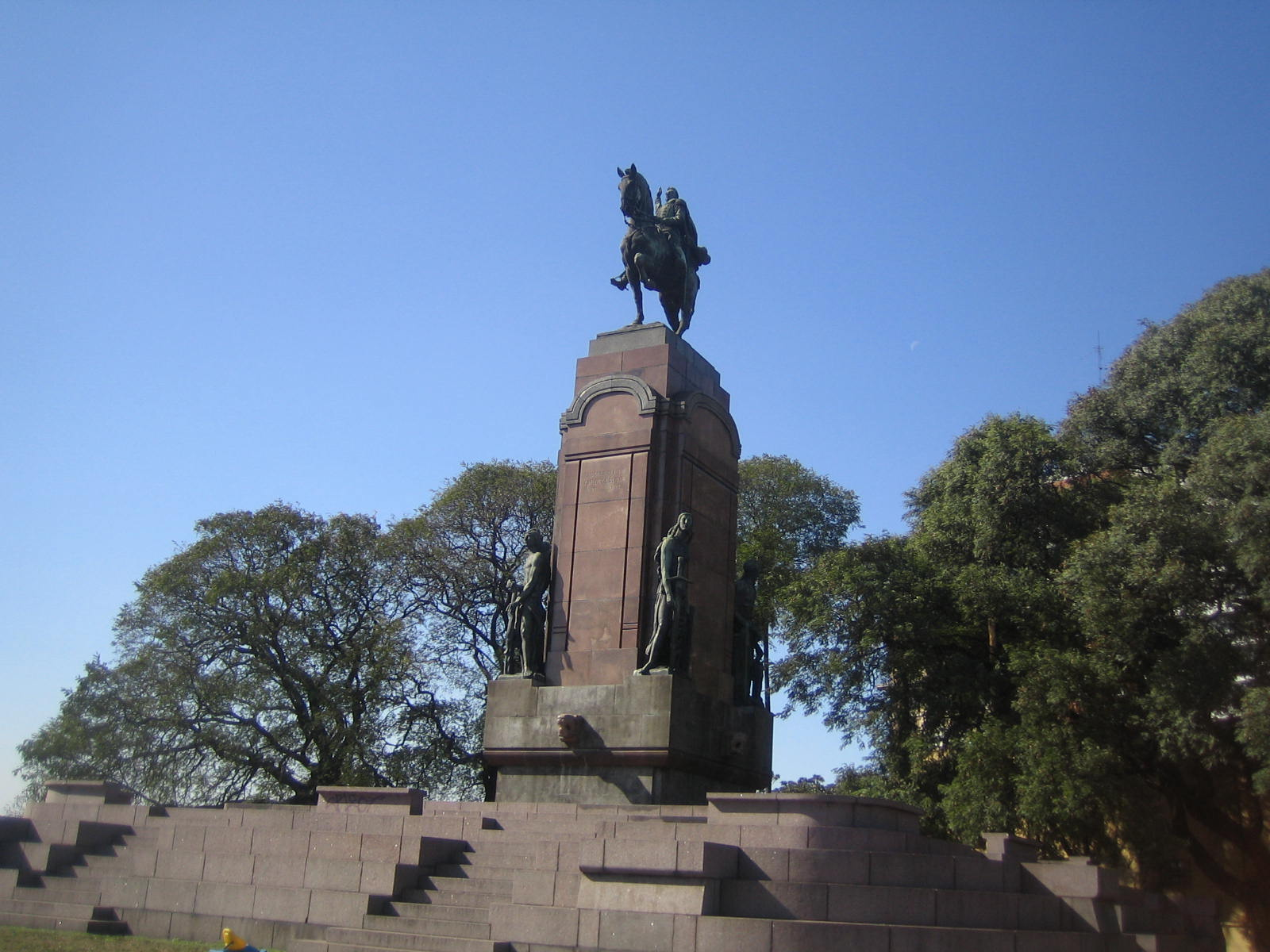
Monument to General Carlos M. de Alvear (1925) by Antoine Bourdelle

The Monument to General Carlos M. de Alvear (Spanish: Monumento ecuestre a Carlos María de Alvear) is a public sculpture monument located on Plaza Julio de Caro, a landmark in the Recoleta neighbourhood of Buenos Aires, Argentina. It was raised in honor of Carlos María de Alvear (1788-1852).

It is a work by French sculptor Antoine Bourdelle. It is considered by the author as his masterpiece in the great monuments.

In 1912, Rodolfo Alcorta, a friend of Bourdelle, invited the sculptor to participate in a concours for the realization of this monument. He received the commission in 1913. The author took nearly ten years to complete the sculpture. Once finished the monument was shipped to Buenos Aires from France in 1925.

The sculpture and the pedestal of polished pink granite adorned with additional bronzes by the artist, stands in its current location since 12 October 1926.

== Location ==
Located on the Plaza Julio de Caro, next to the Palais de Glace, located across Avenida Alvear, right next to the Plaza Intendente Alvear, exactly opposite the work that honors her son Torcuato de Alvear. This site is located in the heart of Recoleta.

== Gallery ==
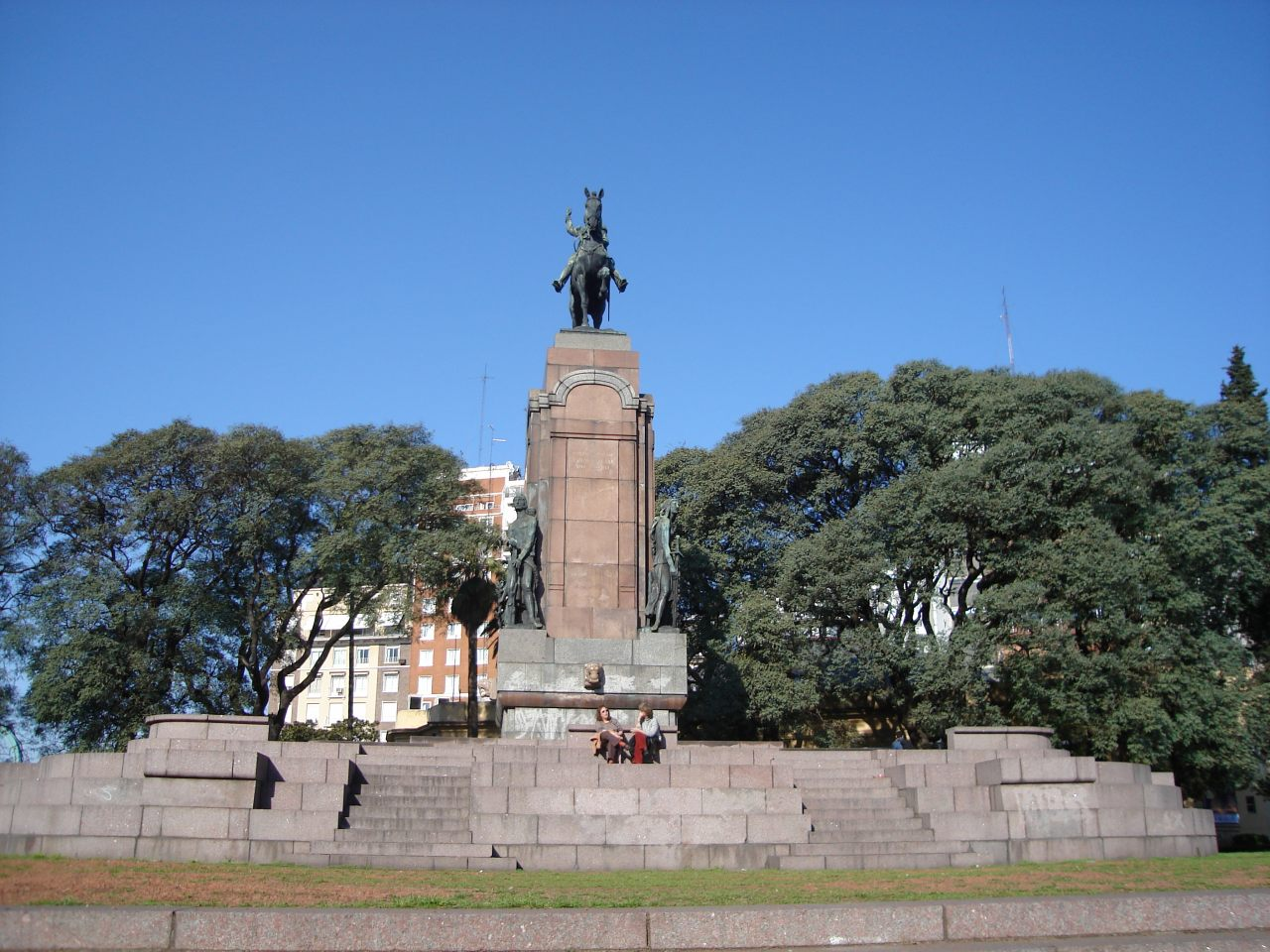

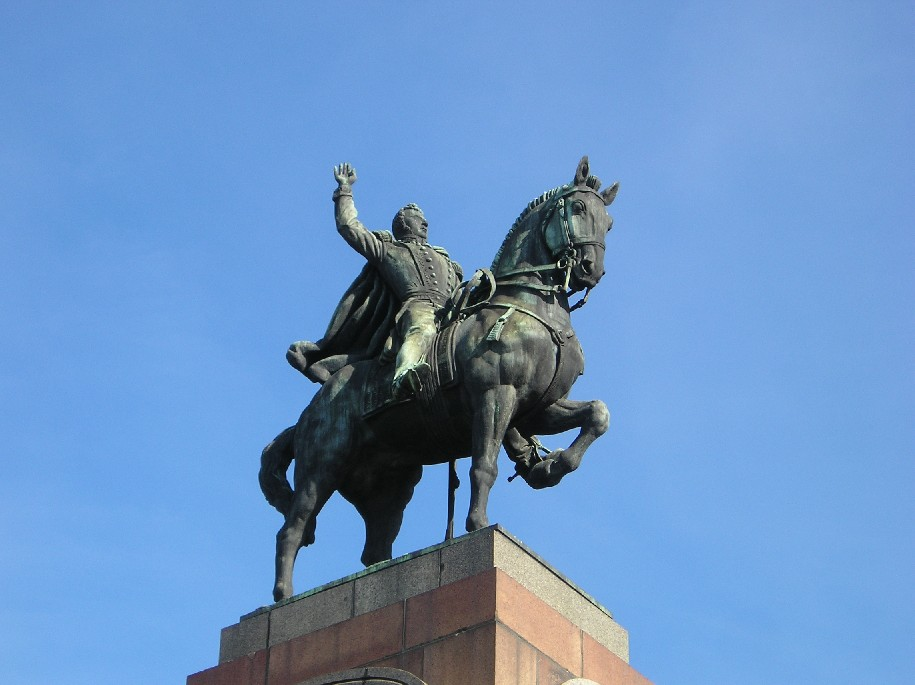

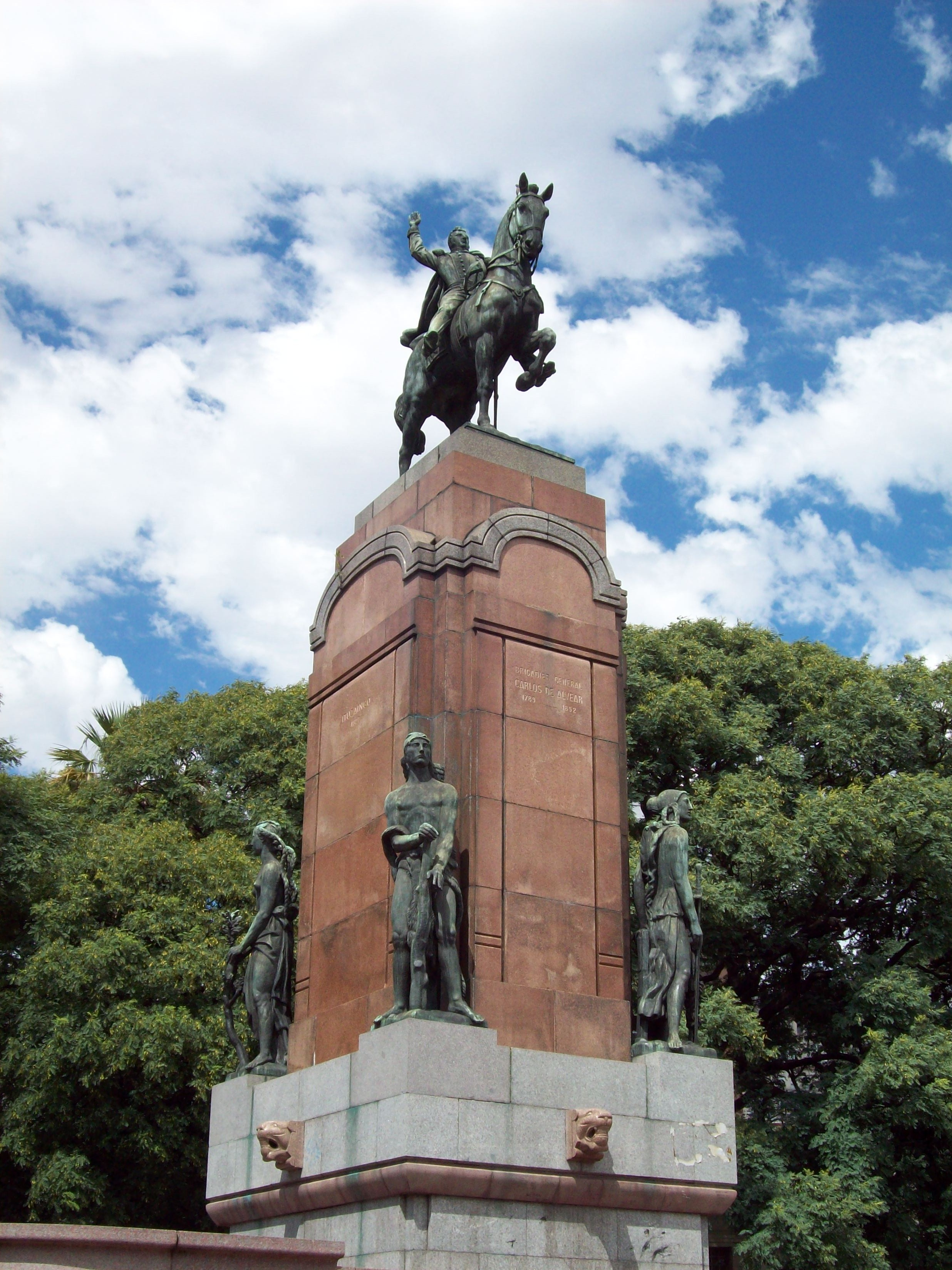

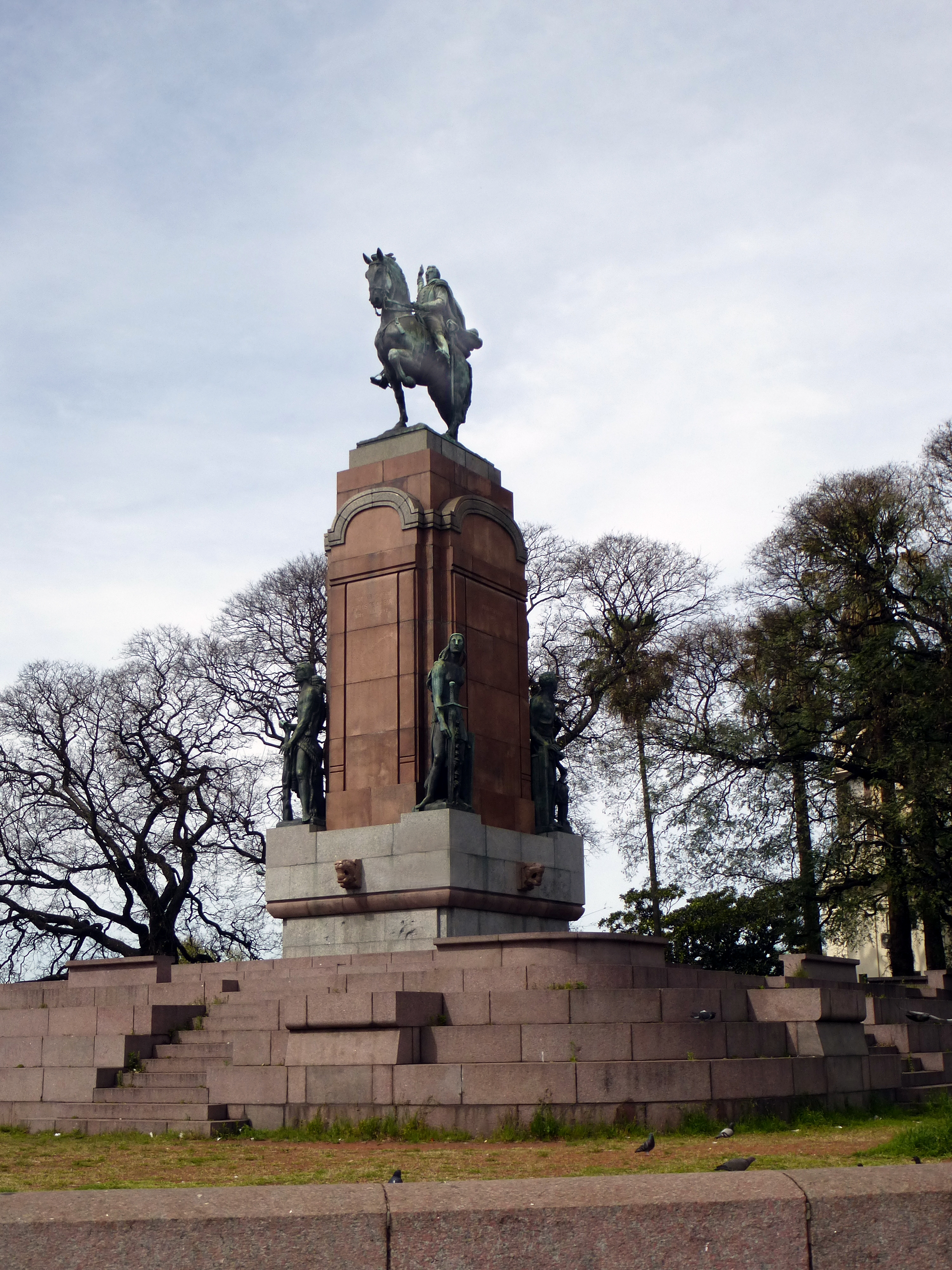

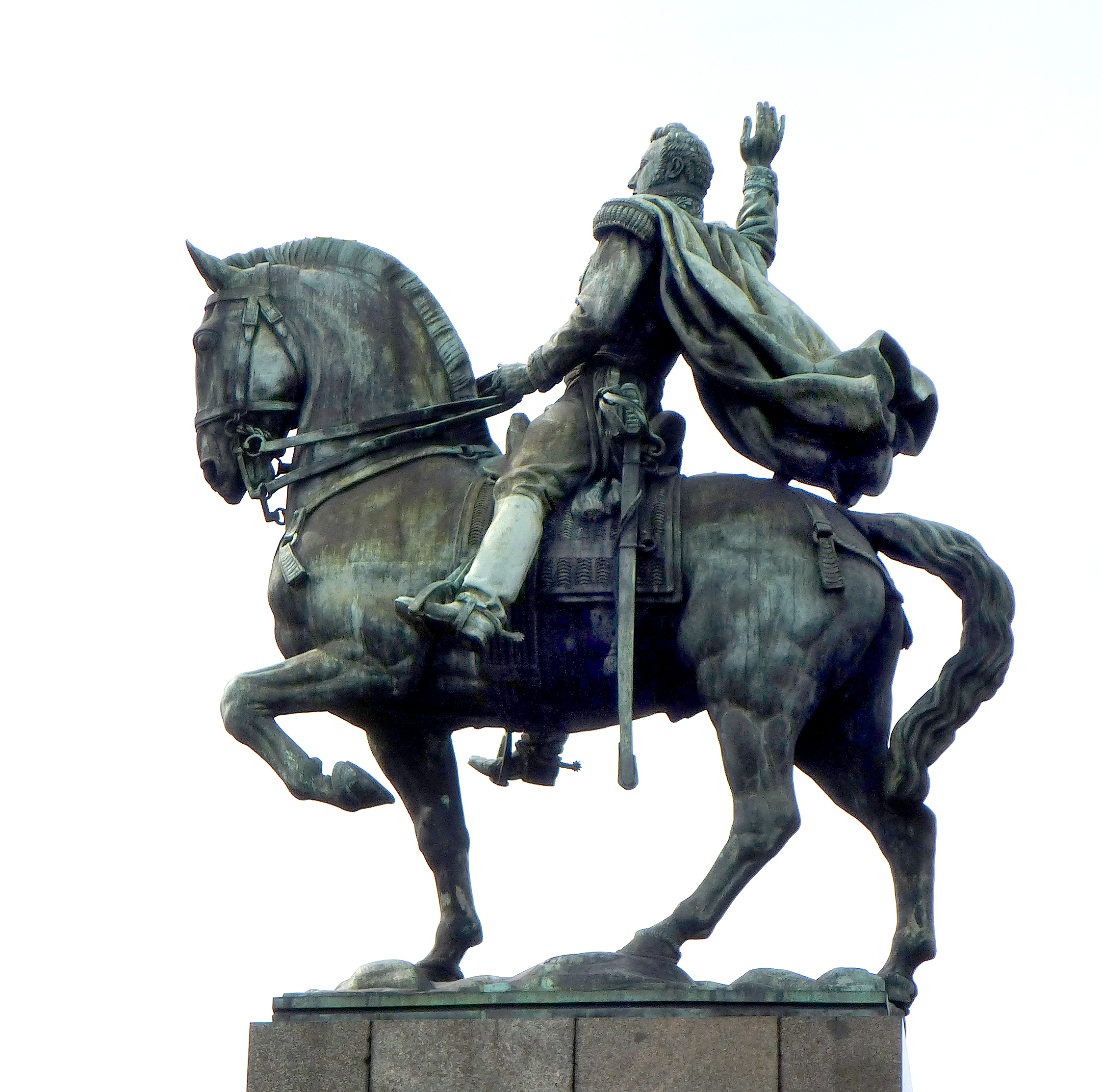

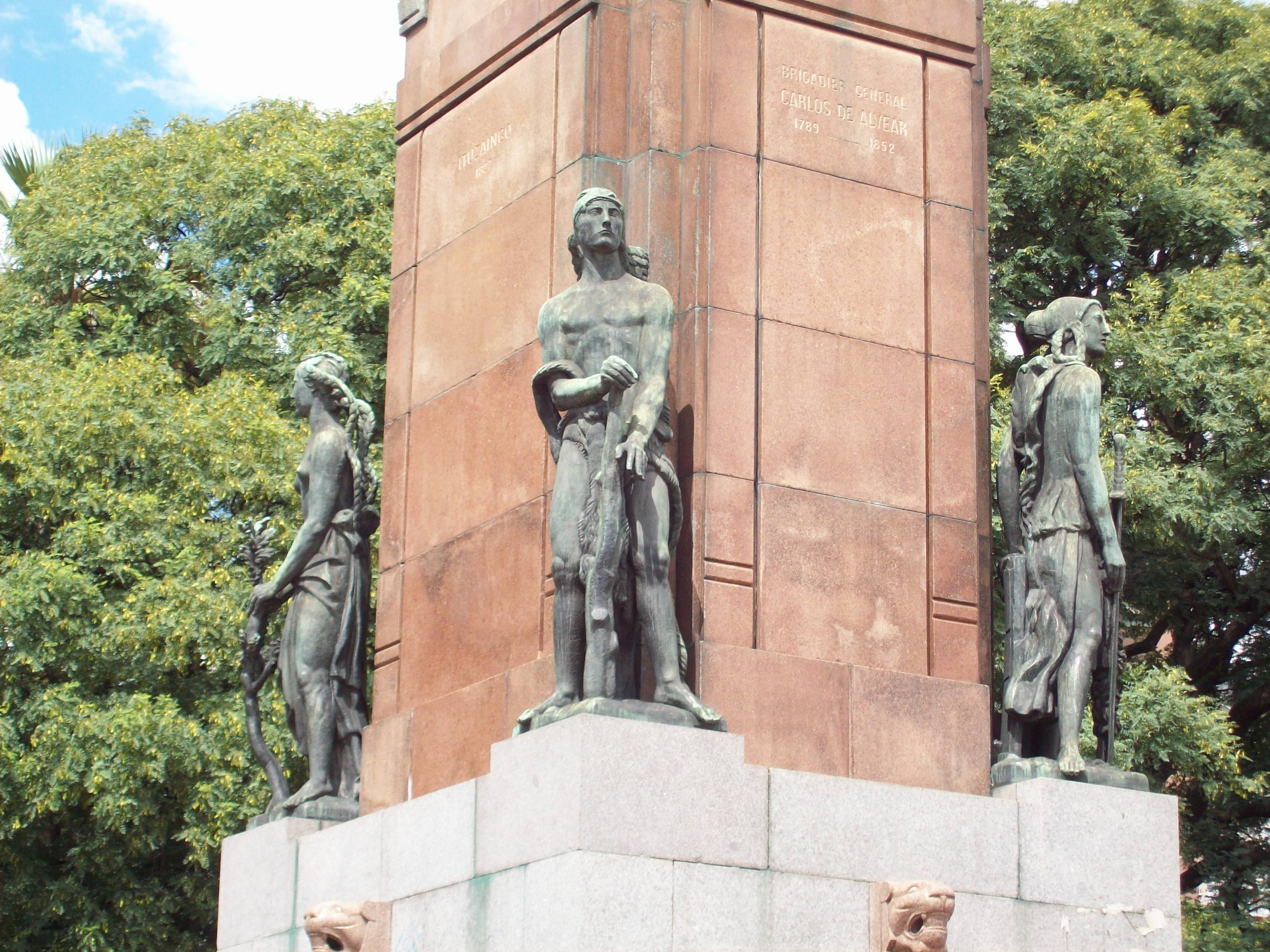

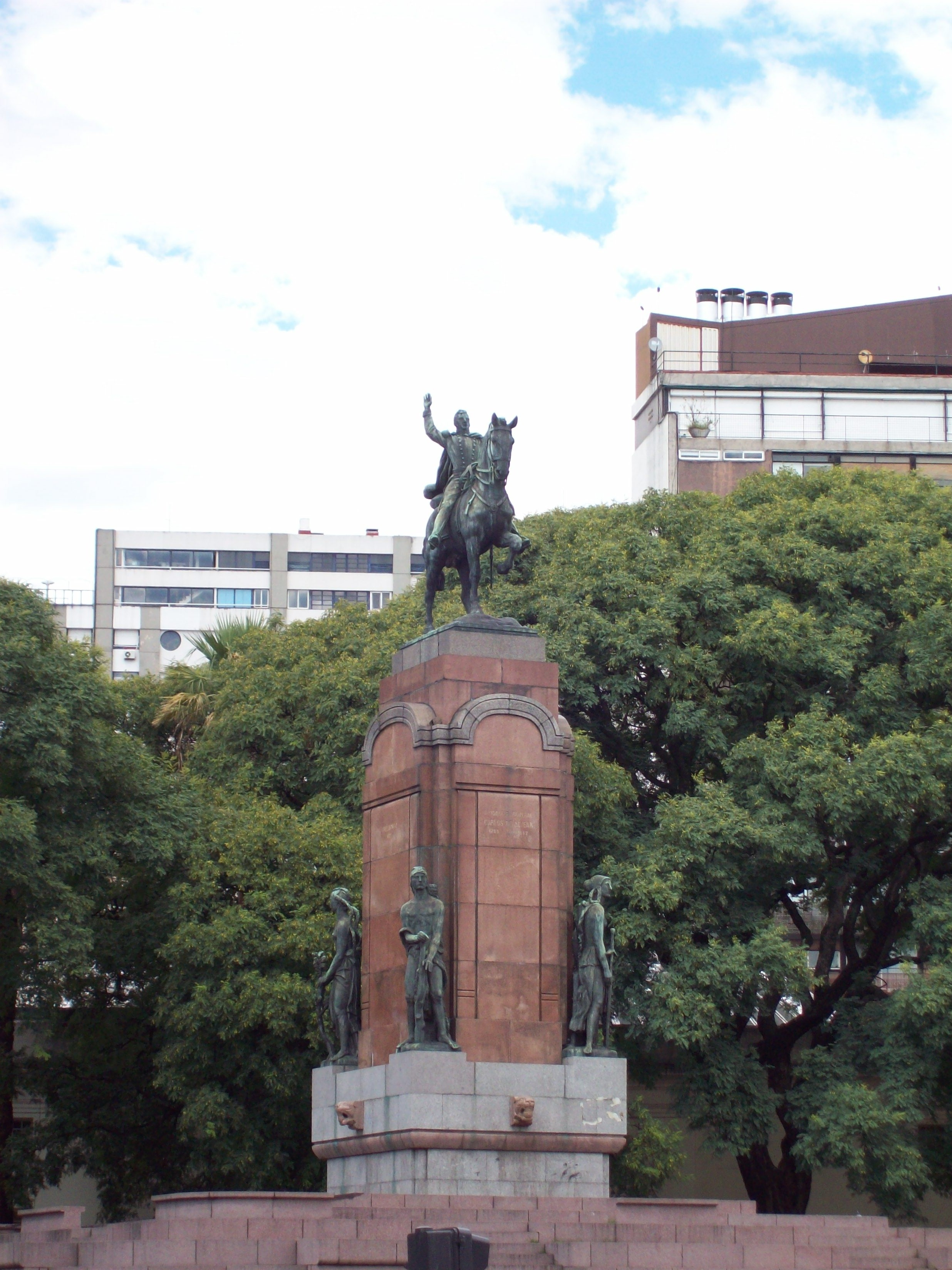

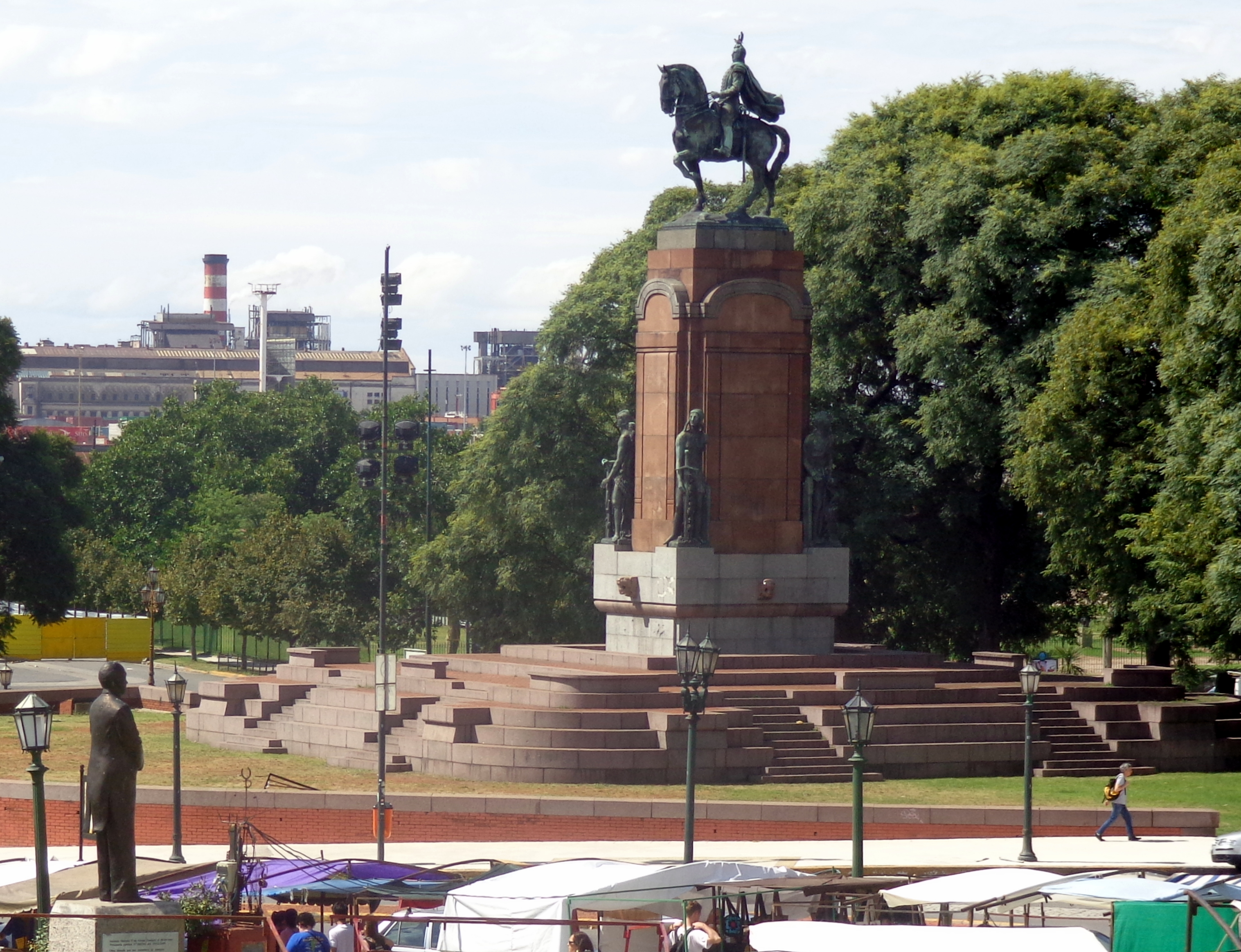

== See also ==
- List of works by Antoine Bourdelle
