= Café La Biela =

Café in Buenos Aires, Argentina

Coordinates: 34°35′16.5″S 58°23′27″W

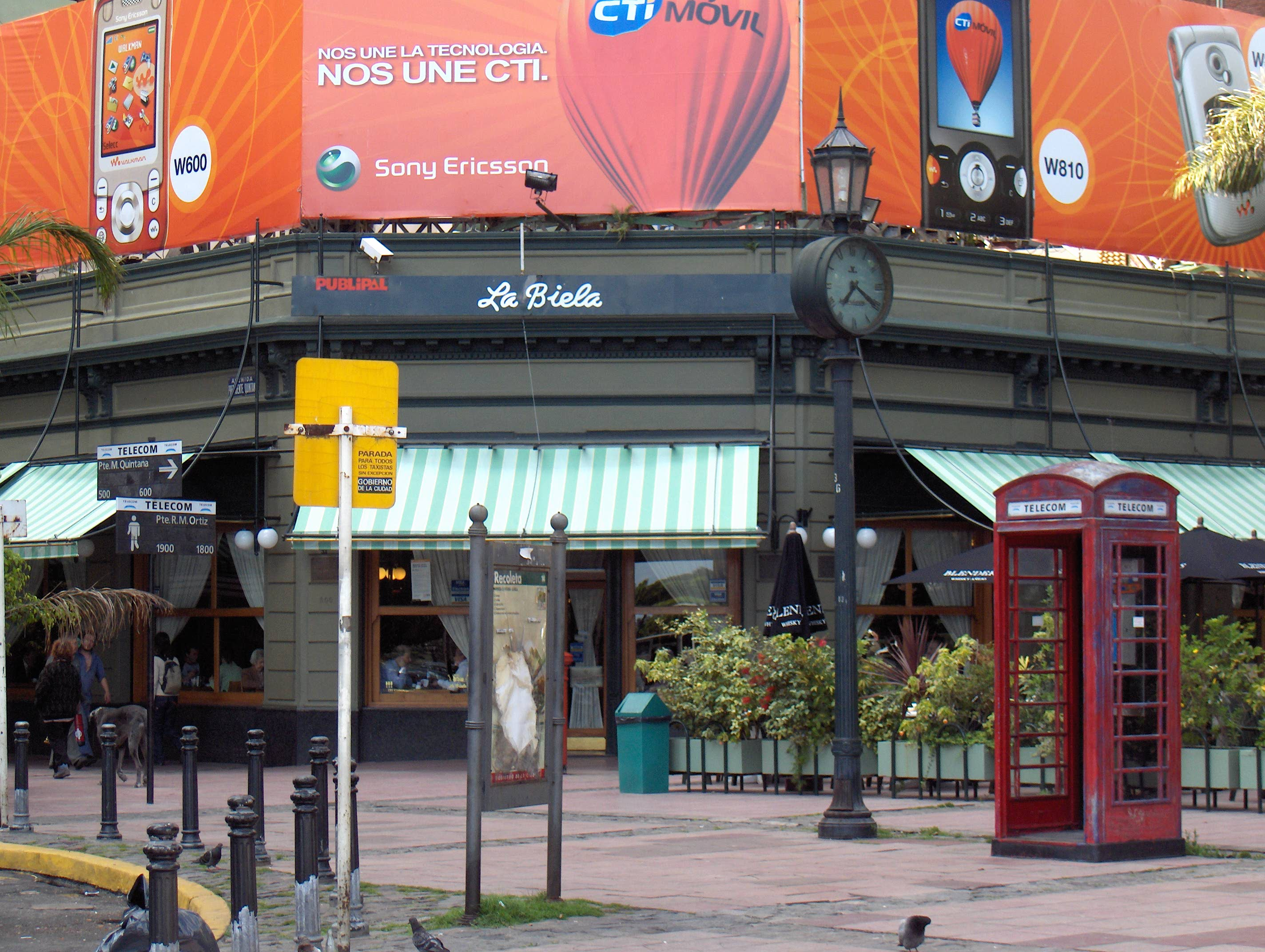
Café La Biela

Café La Biela (in English: The Connecting-rod Café) is a traditional café in the Recoleta district of Buenos Aires, Argentina, situated at 600 Quintana Avenue on the corner of Junin street, opposite the church of Nuestra Senora del Pilar and the adjoining Recoleta Cemetery. The café has a large terrace in front with outdoor tables under the shade of a giant rubber tree, and is a popular with locals and tourists alike.

== Origins ==
In the middle of the 19th century Recoleta was an area of farmland and on the site today occupied by the café was a general store. When it opened as a small pavement cafe in 1850 it was baptized "La Veredita" by its Spanish owner but its name later changed to the Aero Bar because of its popularity with members of the nearby Argentine Civil Pilots Association.

For many years popular with politicians, writers, artists, actors and media celebrities, La Biela acquired its present name in the 1950s when it became a popular meeting place for racing car champions, including the five times Formula One world champion Juan Manuel Fangio, and for fans of the sport.

== Interior ==
Black-and-white photos of racing car champions, together with a variety of motoring memorabilia (including radiator grills, connecting rods, lamps and horns) decorate the walls of the traditional interior which has wood paneling and curtains at the windows.

Behind the bar are photographs taken by the Argentine writer Adolfo Bioy Casares, who used to frequent the café along with his writer friend Jorge Luis Borges, and who took these photographs to illustrate a book they wrote together.

== Today ==
In 1999, Café La Biela was declared a Place of Cultural Interest by the city.

== Notable visitors ==
- Juan Manuel Fangio
- José Froilán González
- Emerson Fittipaldi
- Jackie Stewart
- Robert Duvall
- Francis Ford Coppola
- Jorge Luis Borges
- Adolfo Bioy Casares
- Guy Williams
- Mario Vargas Llosa
- Robert de Niro
- Mick Jagger
- Julio Cortazar
