= Basilica of Our Lady of the Pillar, Buenos Aires =

Church in Buenos Aires, Argentina

Coordinates: 34.5873°S 58.3911°W

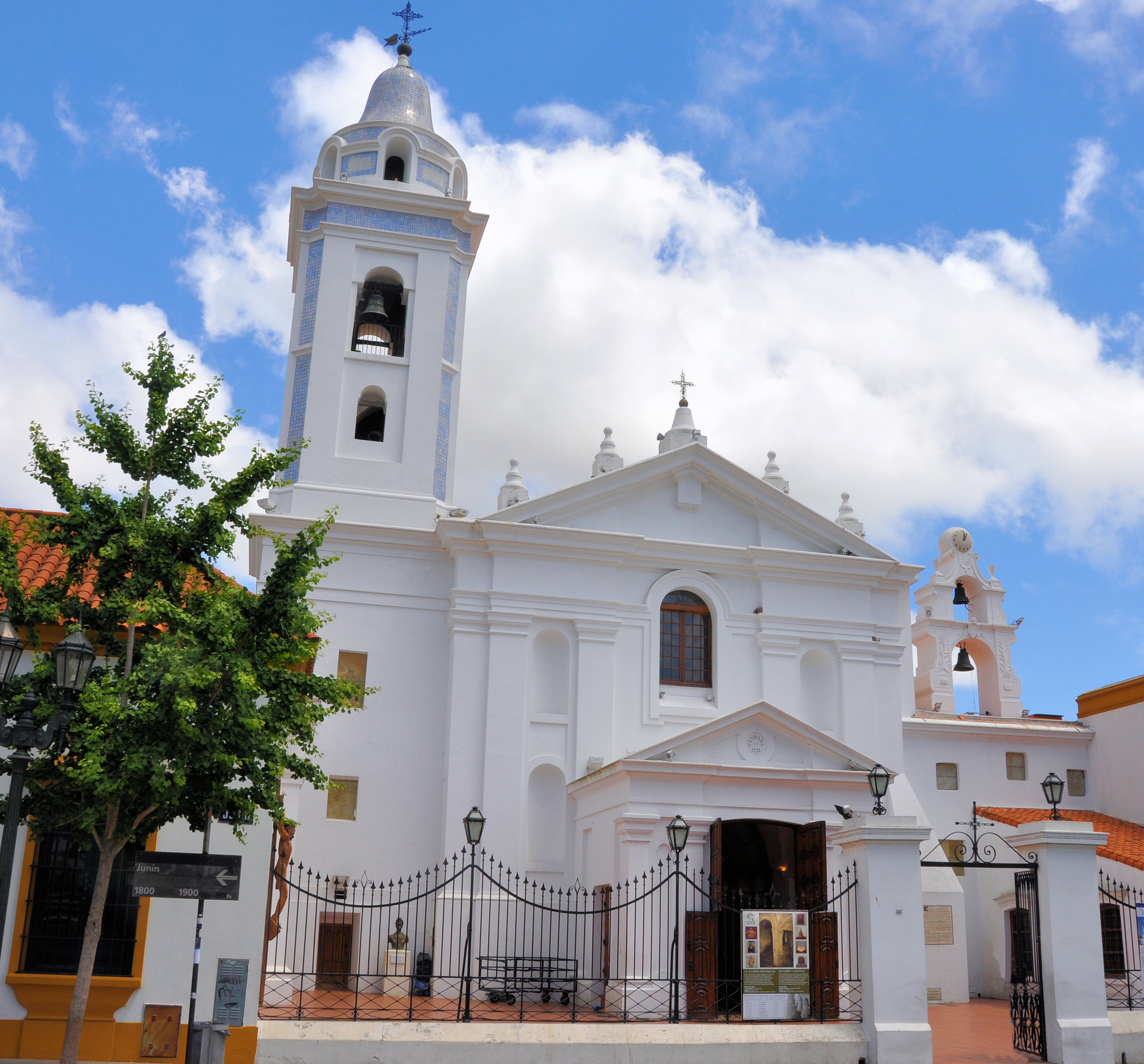
The basilica

The Basilica of Our Lady of the Pillar in Recoleta, Buenos Aires, was built as part of the Franciscan monastery, completed in 1732 and dedicated to Our Lady of the Pillar. It is the second-oldest church in Buenos Aires, and has served as a parish church following the expulsion of the Franciscans in 1821.

Its construction was begun by Italian Jesuit architect Andrés Blanqui and finished under Juan Bautista Prímoli.
