= Recoleta, Buenos Aires =

Section of the capital city

Coordinates: 34°35′26″S 58°23′26″W

Recoleta
- Neighborhood of Buenos Aires
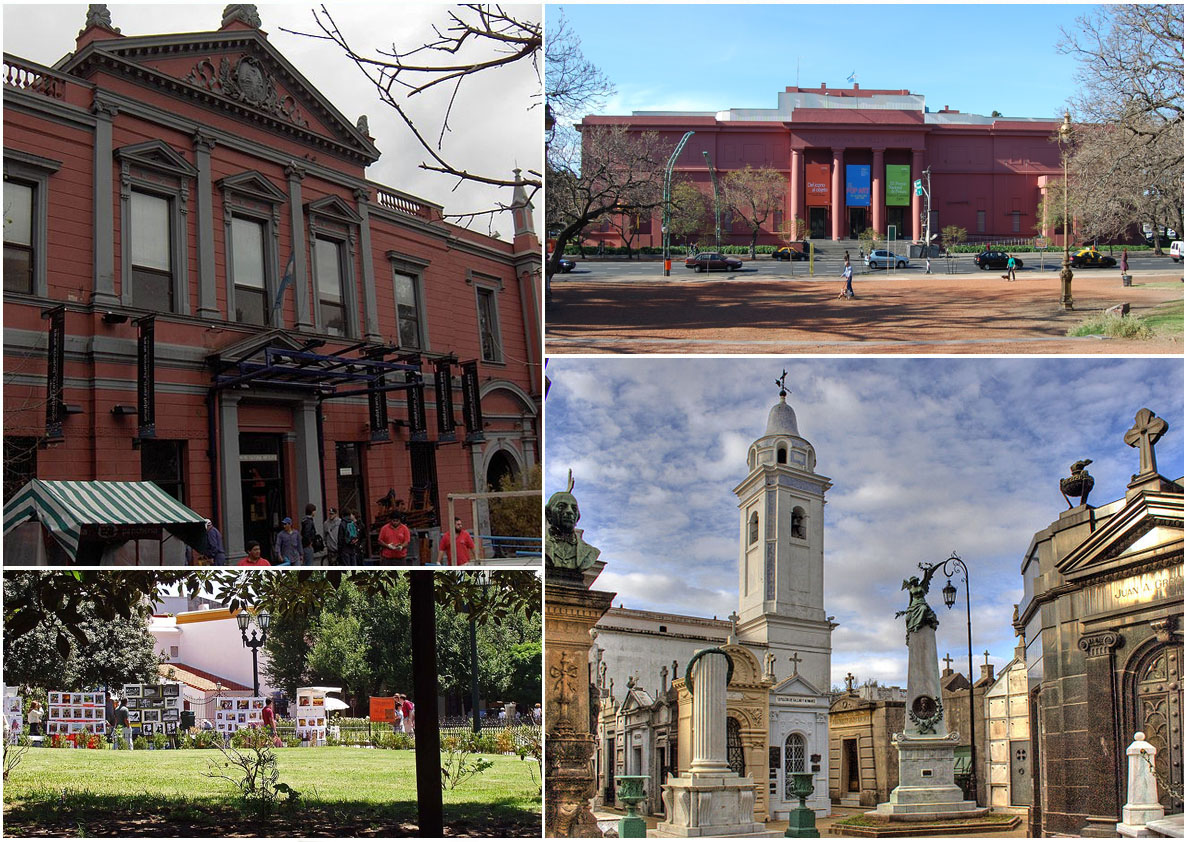
- From left to right, top to bottom: the Recoleta Cultural Center, Floralis Genérica, France Square and the Recoleta Cemetery with the Basilica of Our Lady of the Pillar.

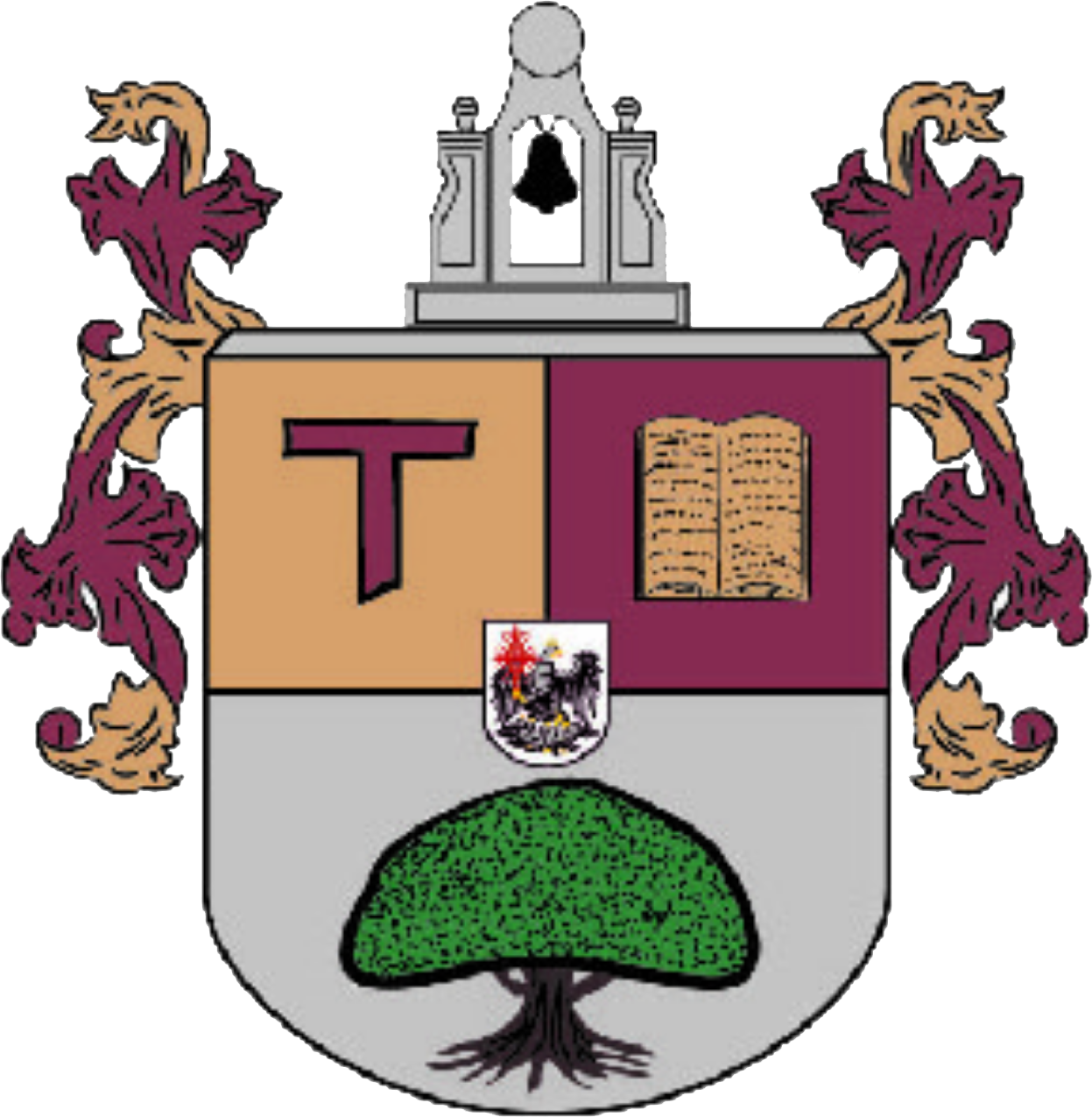
- Emblem
- Location of Recoleta within Buenos Aires
- Country: Argentina
- Autonomous city: Buenos Aires
- Comuna: C2
- Important sites: La Recoleta Cemetery, Basilica of Our Lady of the Pillar, National Library of the Argentine Republic, National Museum of Fine Arts, National Museum of Decorative Arts, Alvear Palace Hotel, Café La Biela, Recoleta Cultural Centre

Government
  - President: Ramiro Reyno (PRO-JxC)

Area
  - Total: 5.4 km^{2} (2.1 sq mi)

Population
  - Total: 188,780
  - Density: 35,000/km^{2} (91,000/sq mi)
- Time zone: UTC-3 (ART)

Recoleta is a barrio or neighborhood of Buenos Aires, Argentina, located in the northern part of the city, by the Río de la Plata. The area is perhaps best known to be the home of the distinguished Recoleta Cemetery. It is a traditional upper-class and conservative neighborhood with some of the priciest real estate in the city, known for Paris-style townhouses, lavish former palaces and posh boutiques.

== Geographical location ==
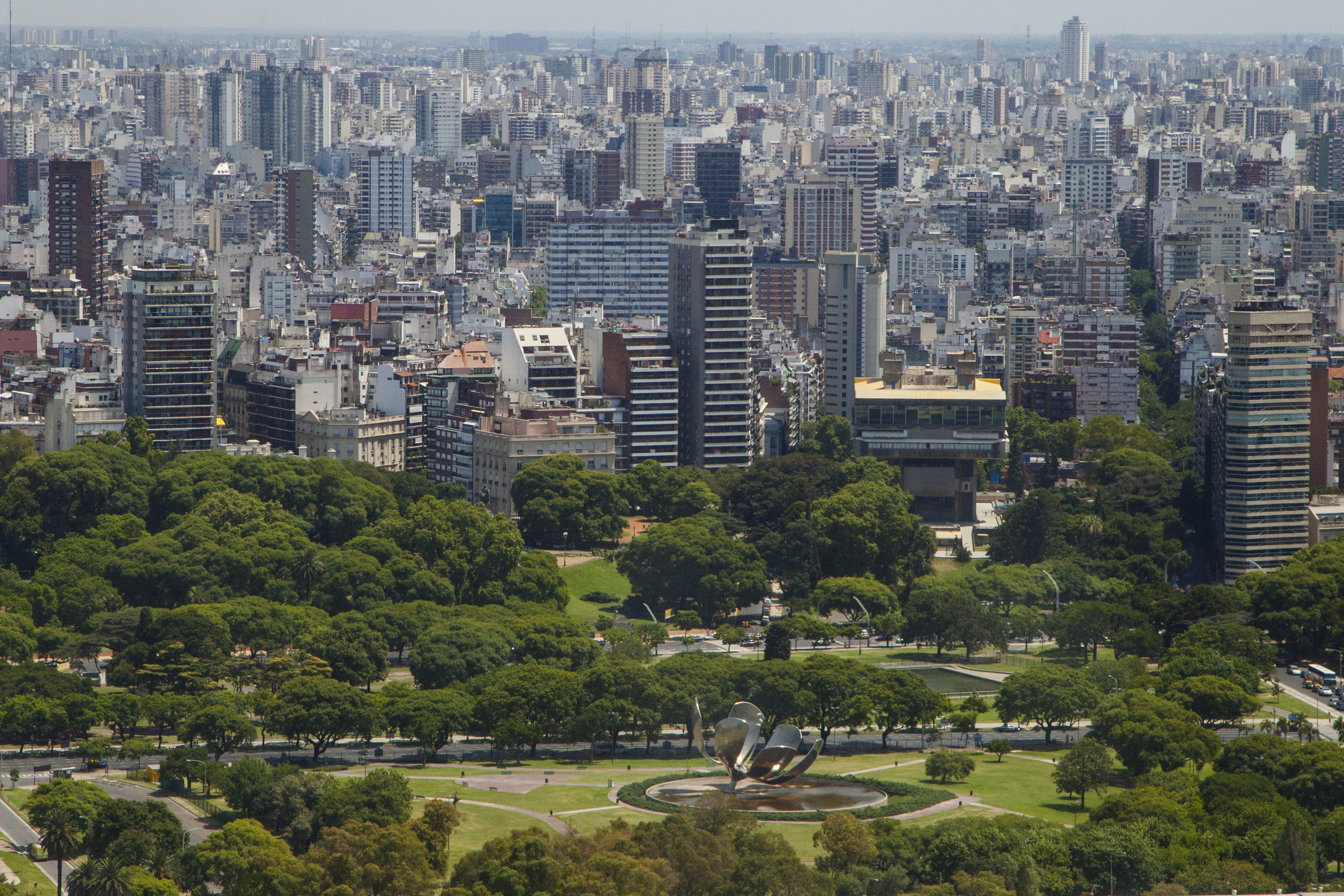
Southwestward view of Recoleta in 2014, overlooking Floralis Genérica and the National Library.

The Recoleta neighborhood is composed of the area limited by Montevideo and Uruguay Streets, Córdoba Avenue, Mario Bravo and Coronel Díaz Streets, Las Heras Avenue, Tagle Street, the F.G.B.M railway, Jerónimo Salguero Street, and by the Río de La Plata or River Plate.

Neighboring communities are Retiro to the southeast, San Nicolás, Balvanera and Almagro to the south, and Palermo to the northwest, and the River Plate to the northeast.

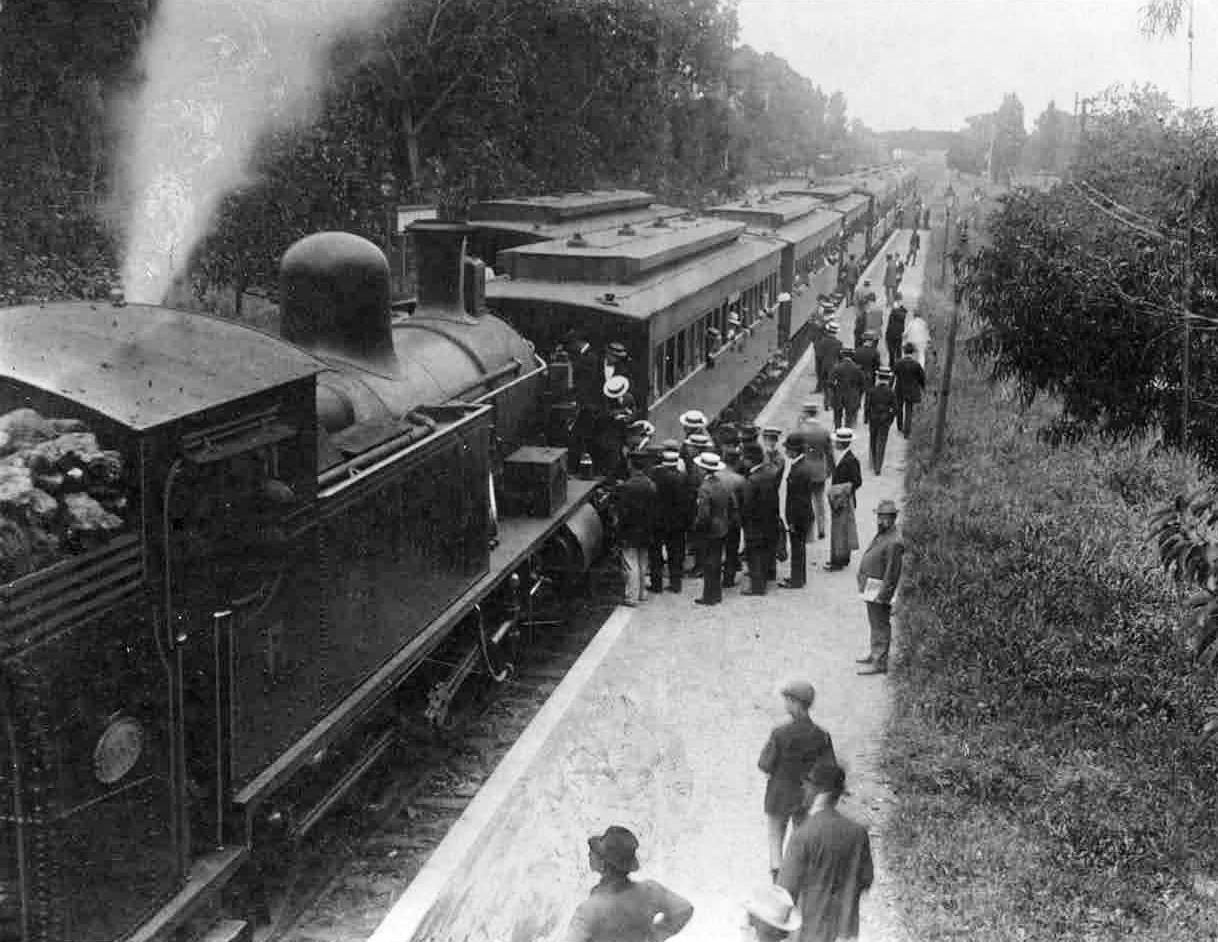
The Recoleta railway station in 1904. The rail line was later deactivated and the station demolished.

The neighborhood is served by Lines D and H of the Buenos Aires Underground, as well as by many bus lines in Avenida Santa Fe.

== History ==
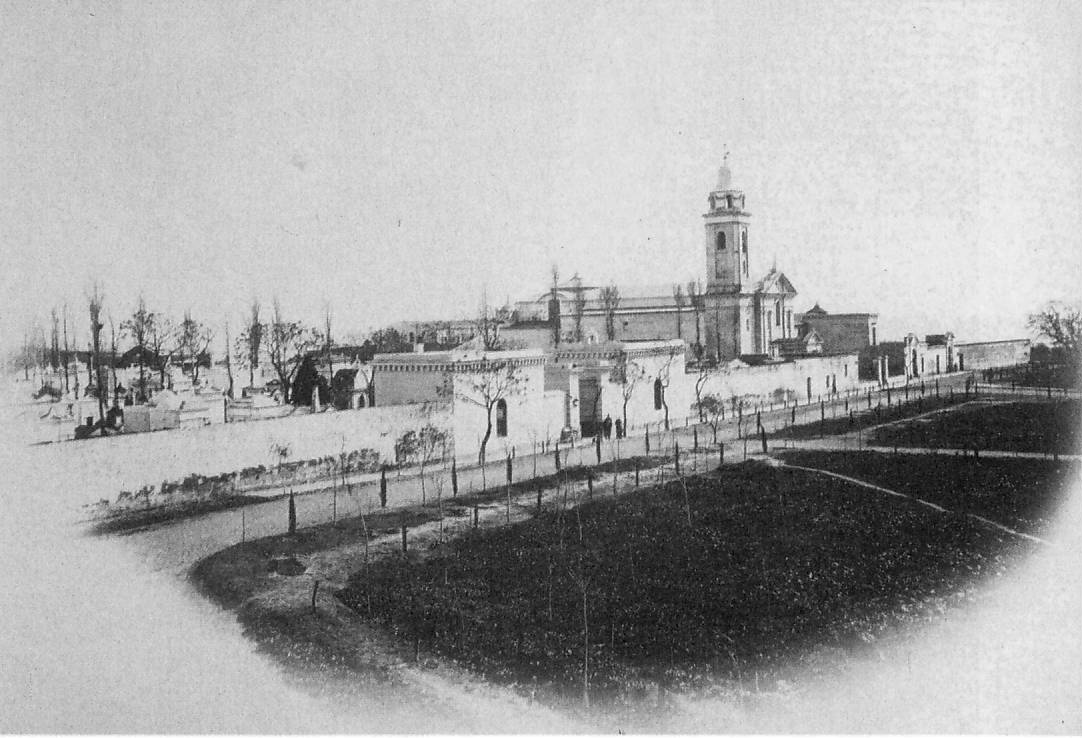
Recoleta Plaza in 1867: the Recoleta Cemetery and the Church of Nuestra Señora del Pilar.

The name of the neighborhood comes from the monastery – the Recollect Convent (Convento de la Recoleta) – of the Recollect fathers, members of the Franciscan Order, which was established in the area at the beginning of the 18th century. They founded a monastery and a church dedicated to Nuestra Señora del Pilar with a cemetery attached. The Recoleta pathway is nearly the exact geographic center of the neighborhood, and one of its highest points in the city, which, at the end of the 19th century attracted wealthy families from the south of the city who sought to escape from the deadly yellow fever outbreak which began in 1871. From that time on, the Recoleta has been one of the most stylish and expensive neighborhoods in Buenos Aires, home to private family mansions, foreign embassies, and luxury hotels, including the Alvear Palace Hotel.

The historical center of the neighborhood is the Church of Nuestra Señora del Pilar, construction of which was completed in 1732. For that reason, the neighborhood was occasionally called El Pilar. The church was originally situated at the edge of the banks that sloped down to the Río de la Plata and Manso Creek. The creek, also known as Tercero del Norte, currently flows through an underground pipe, and runs below present-day Pueyrredón Avenue. It formed a type of small delta, with channels along the current Austria and Tagle Streets, which flowed into the Río de la Plata.

When Buenos Aires suffered terrible cholera and yellow fever epidemics in the 1870s, the population of the city spread out to avoid the contagion. It was for that reason that, while the underprivileged classes settled in the south-southwest of the city, the most wealthy settled in the Recoleta area, where the height of the terrain reduced the presence of insects which transmitted the diseases.

These families, many of which were members of the ruling national elite, considered of "noble" ancestry (although there were no noblemen in the former Hispanic territories) for having descended from respected historical figures from the period of Argentine independence, built mansions and other notable buildings in several European architectural styles of the period. Many of these were demolished in the early 1950s and late 1960s or during the 2000s. Consequently, Buenos Aires has often been referred to as the "Paris of South America". Nowadays, what is left of these traditional buildings coexist with elegant modern constructions.

Together with some sections of the neighboring communities of Retiro and Palermo, Recoleta forms a part of the area known as Barrio Norte, Buenos Aires, a traditional residential zone for the city's most affluent families, where a great portion of the cultural life of the city is concentrated.

== Culture ==
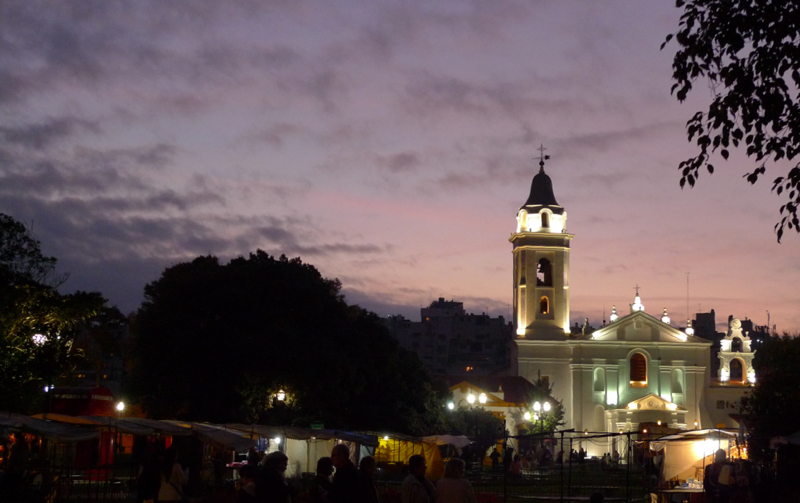
Church of Nuestra Señora del Pilar.

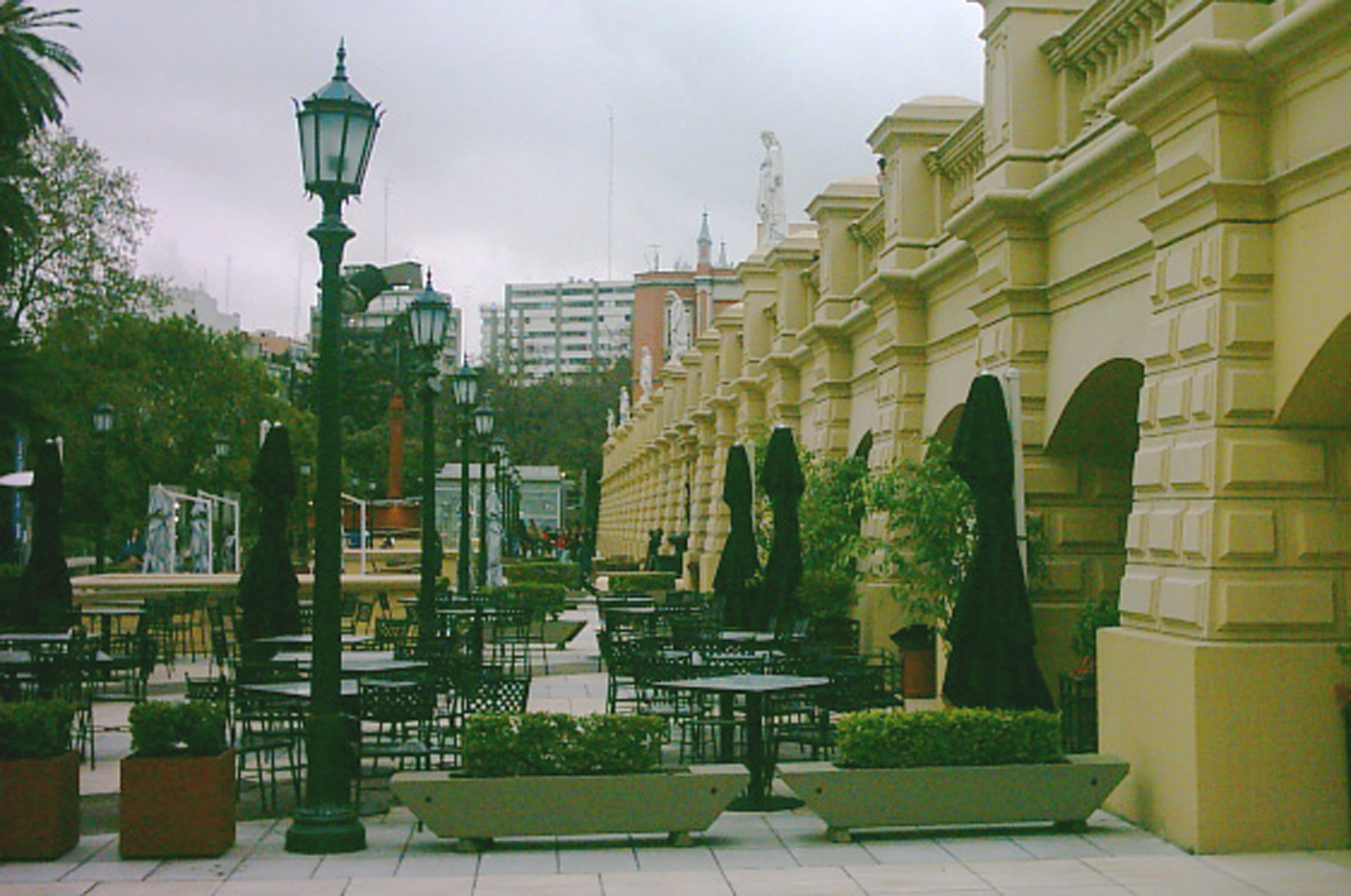
Buenos Aires Design, commercial center dedicated exclusively to décor and design, and home to the Hard Rock Cafe.

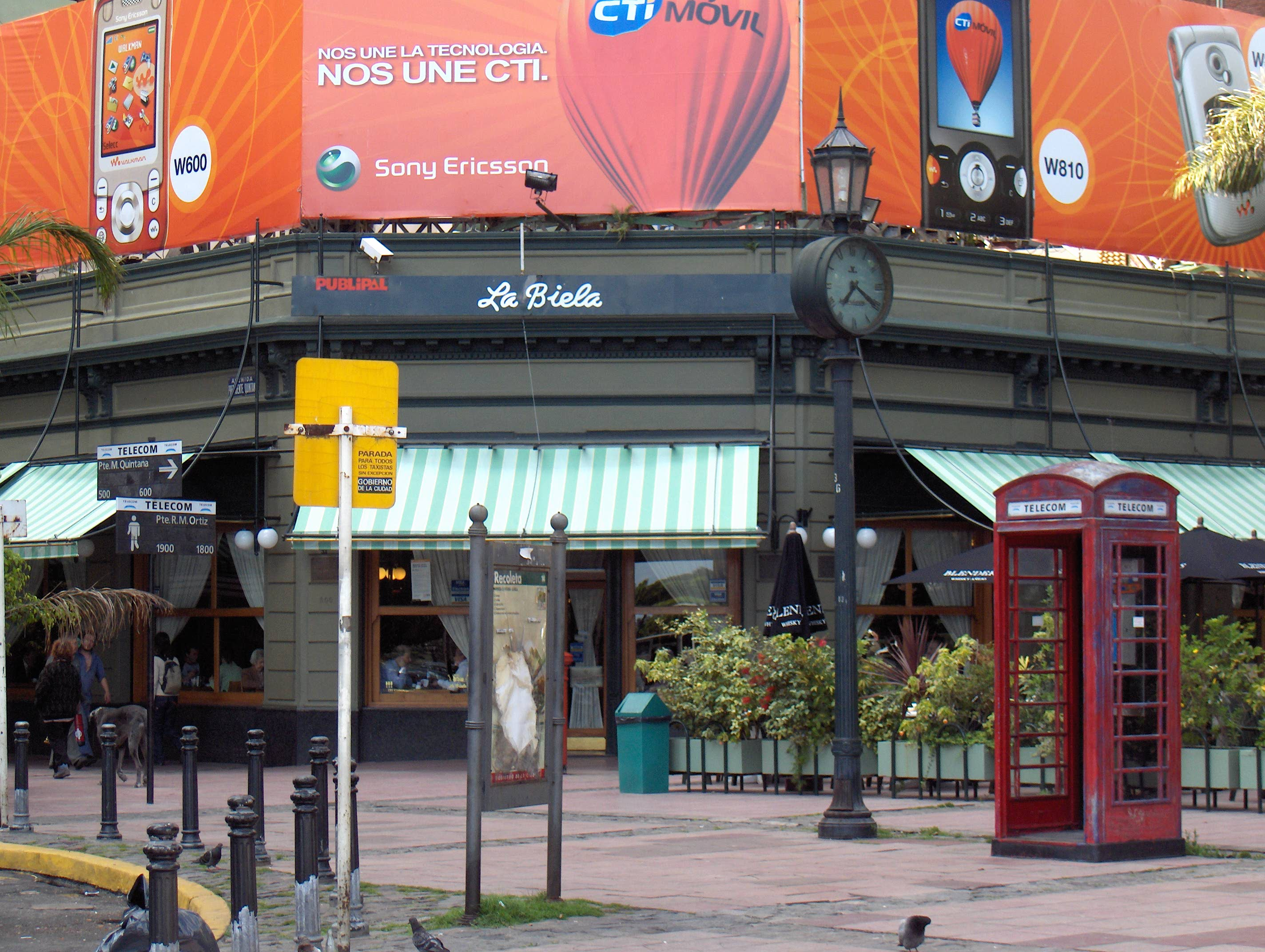
"La Biela" Café-Bar on the corner of Quintana and Ortiz, is a place that represents the area well.

The Recoleta neighborhood is distinguished by its great cultural spaces. In addition to historical monuments, it is home to the National Fine Arts Museum or Museo Nacional de Bellas Artes, the National Library of Argentina, the Recoleta Cultural Center, and other exhibition venues. The neighborhood is also well known for its shopping facilities.

=== Recoleta Cemetery ===
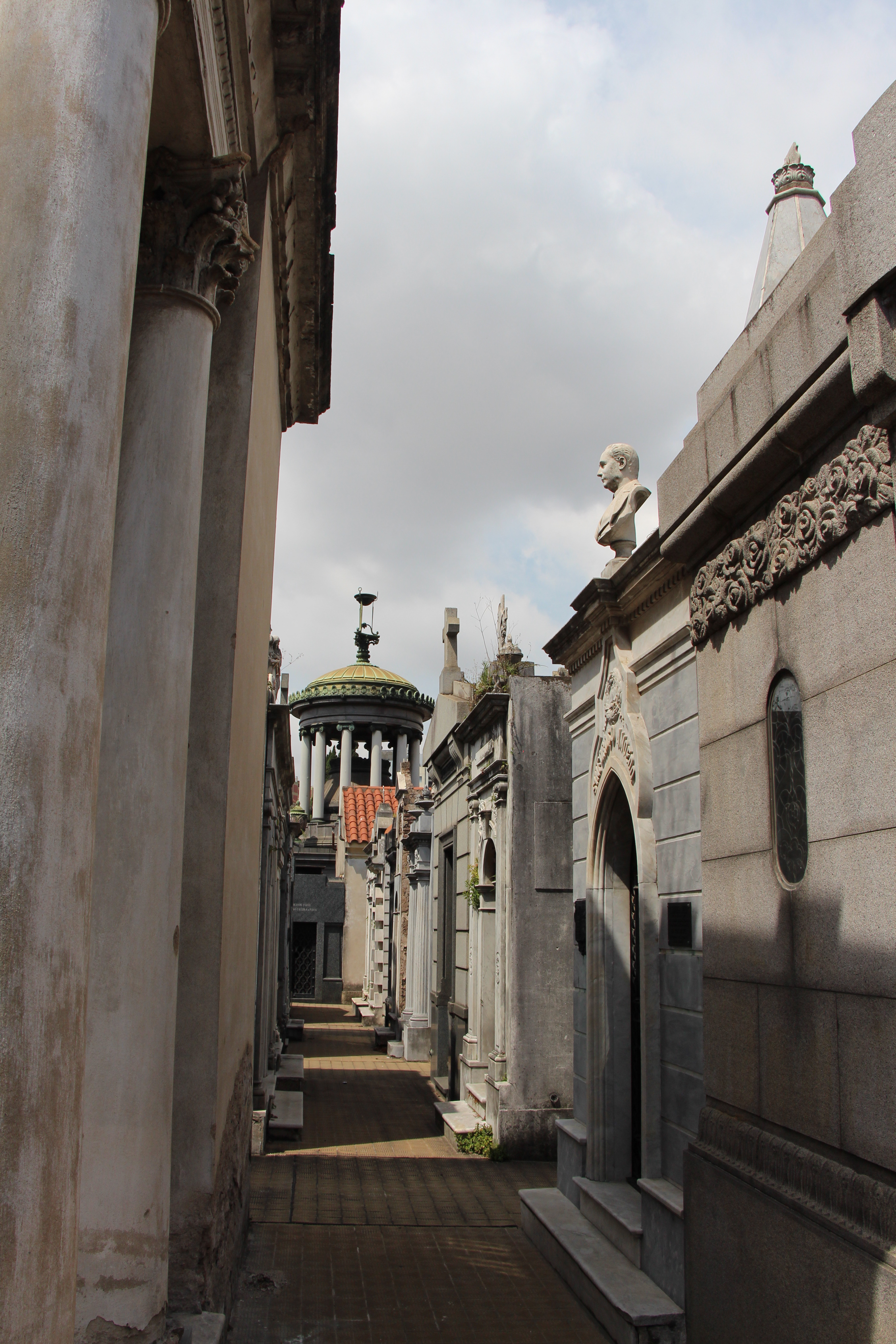
Recoleta Cemetery.

The Recoleta Cemetery is one of the main tourist attractions in the neighborhood. It was designed by the French architect Prosper Catelin, at the request of President Bernardino Rivadavia, and was dedicated in 1822.

=== Museums and cultural centers ===
Next to the cemetery is the former General Juan José Viamonte Shelter, administered in the past by the Recollect Fathers. When it ceased functioning as a shelter for the indigent, it was acquired by the city and converted into the Centro Cultural Recoleta, one of the most important exhibition halls for the plastic arts in the city. 150 meters away, across Libertador Avenue, is the Museo Nacional de Bellas Artes (MNBA), which holds in its permanent collection works of art by Argentine artists such as Berni and Seguí, as well as works by European masters such as Titian, Goya, Rembrandt, Gauguin, and Manet. To the east, along Posadas Street, is the Palais de Glace, which was, at the beginning of the twentieth century, an ice skating rink. It has since been turned into a multimedia exhibition center. The Centro Municipal de Exposiciones, which houses a wide variety of exhibitions and cultural events, is located behind Carlos Thays Park.

=== Education ===
Several of the oldest and most prestigious schools in the capital are in the Recoleta neighborhood. Among them are the Escuela Superior de Comercio Carlos Pellegrini, the Escuela Argentina Modelo, the Scuola Edmundo de Amicis, the Colegio Champagnat, the Colegio Mallinkdrodt, the Colegio San Agustín and Normal School 1, the oldest portion of which has been declared a National Monument.

Many university schools are also found in Recoleta, including several University of Buenos Aires faculties such as the Law, Medicine, Dentistry and Pharmacy and Biochemistry faculties, and the Las Heras branch of the Faculty of Engineering, an annex building in the neogothic style building characterized by the cold, humid air typical of gothic structures.

A construction in the brutalist style, located on Agüero Street between Libertador Avenue and Las Heras, is home to the new National Library of Argentina. The building was completed in 1992, after 20 years of construction work. It contains more than four million volumes, including twenty priceless editions, such as a rare copy of Dante's Divine Comedy.

=== Recoleta and tango ===
Several cabarets in the neighborhood served as locales for tango music and dance. The Pabellón de las Rosas, on Libertador Avenue and Tagle Street, like the Café de Hansen in the Palermo neighborhood, maintained a Belle Époque atmosphere, where the so-called atorrantes ("vagabonds", but also "scoundrels", "spoiled brats") spent their evenings. At this, and at other cabarets such as the Armenonville, a "peringundín" ("dance hall") where Carlos Gardel was known to appear, fights—occasionally bloody—would break out between "malevos" ("ruffians"), "compadritos" ("tough-guys") and "jailaifes" ("high-lifes” or high society boys) according to the florid contemporary slang (lunfardo). In the 1910s, when the Palais de Glace no longer served as an ice skating rink, it became a dance venue, and it is there where the tango finally became accepted by the upper classes of Buenos Aires, especially since it had already become a fad in Paris.

Many tango lyrics reflect life in the Recoleta neighborhood. One song, by Horacio Ferrer, set to music by Ástor Piazzolla, is the "Balada para un loco" ("Ballad for a Madman"), which cites two of the neighborhood streets, Callao and Arenales: "Salís de tu casa por Arenales... / Ya sé que estoy piantao, piantao, piantao... / ¿No ves que va la Luna rodando por Callao,/ que un corso de astronautas y niños, con un vals,/ me baila alrededor...?" (You leave home down Arenales ... / I know I'm mad, mad, mad../ don't you see the moon rolling down Callao? / how a carnival of astronauts and children /dance a vals around me...?")

== Sculpture ==
The neighborhood has numerous statues and sculptures in its parks and plazas. Among the statues are El último centauro ("The Last Centaur"), El Arquero ("The Archer") and the equestrian statue dedicated to Carlos María de Alvear. Additionally, there are works by the sculptor Antoine Bourdelle, the Floralis Genérica by Eduardo Catalano, and the Torso Masculino Desnudo ("Nude Male Torso") by Fernando Botero. The Recoleta Cemetery also possesses many exquisite works of art, obscured by their funerary location: the sculpture known as the Cristo Muerto by Giulio Monteverde, for example. Furthermore, the neighboring Basilica of Nuestra Señora del Pilar holds examples of Spanish Colonial art. Particularly noteworthy is a sculpture which represents one of the Apostles by the Spanish sculptor, Alonso Cano.

== Architecture ==
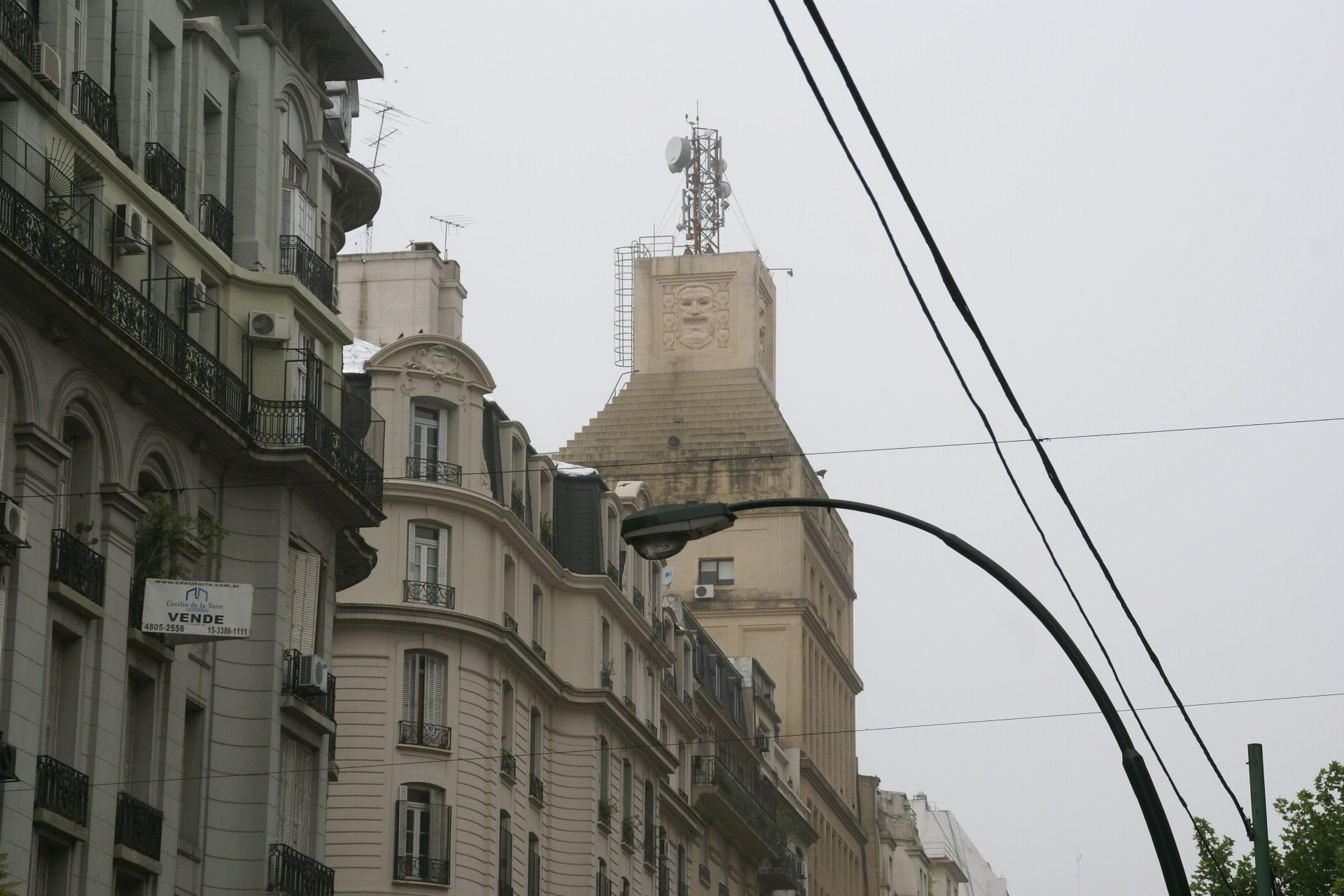
Buildings along Santa Fe Avenue, for long the choicest shopping spot in the city.

From the end of the nineteenth-century to the start of the 1920s, the Recoleta neighborhood has witnessed the construction of a great number of "châteaux" (often imitating those of the Loire valley in France), as well as Parisian style petits hôtels, almost always designed by architects of French origin. The major portion of the building materials (boiseries, slate roof tiles, marble for staircases, bronze and iron work, chandeliers with lead crystal prisms, glass lamp shades, ornate gilded mirrors, and beveled lead crystal window panes, mosaics, etc.) were brought from Europe. But just as it occurred in other neighborhoods of Buenos Aires, these grand buildings, in large part, have been demolished since the 1960s due to the realities of the real estate market: on the land that held an extraordinary private mansion, several ordinary modern buildings could be erected. Currently, several neighborhood groups which organize marches, meetings, and other events are working to halt further destruction of existing landmarks.

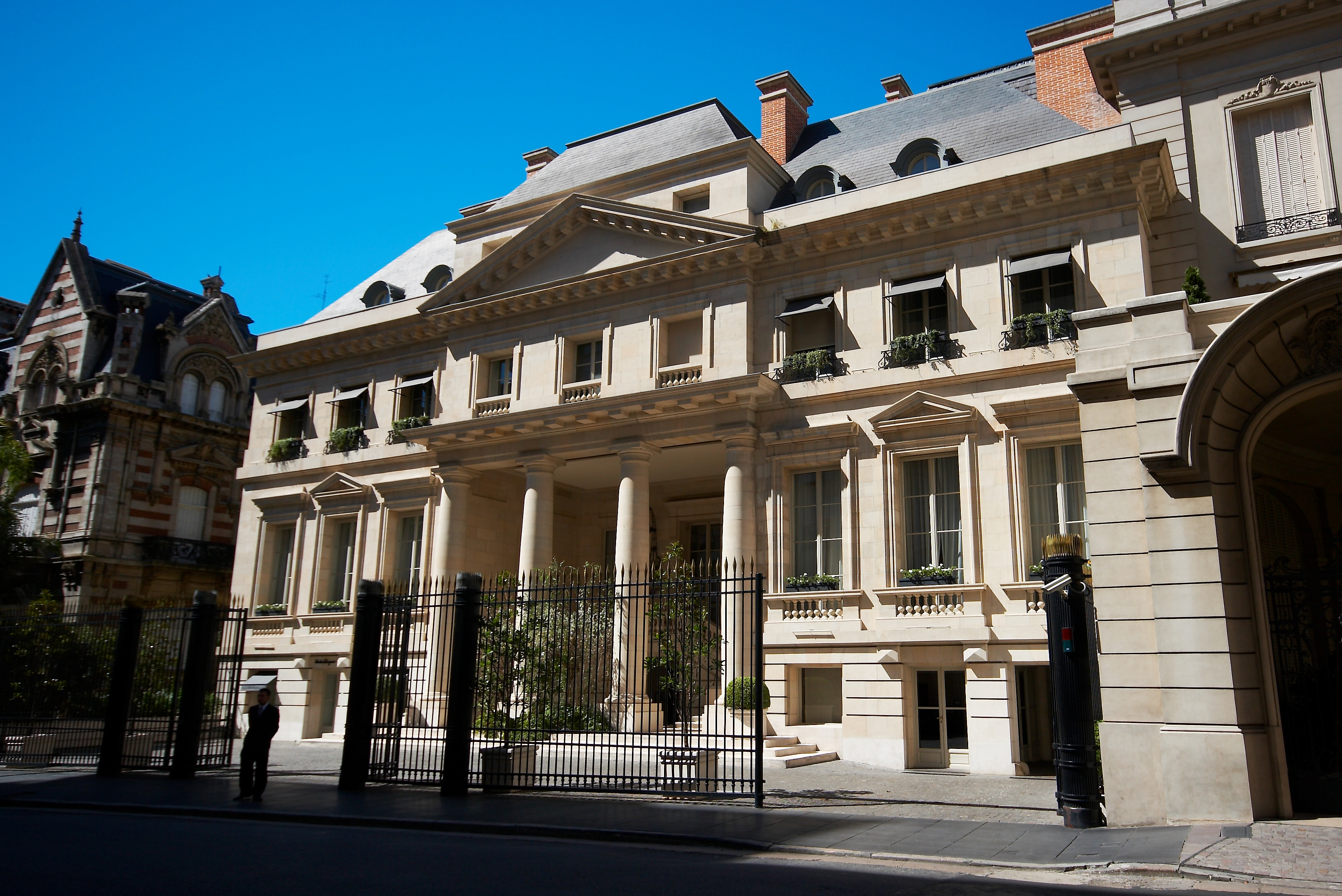
Palacio Duhau, example of some palatial mansions along Alvear Avenue

In spite of much demolition, Recoleta still displays a rich architectural legacy. Outstanding examples are on Alvear Avenue, where such buildings as the Palacio Duhau (former property of the Duhau family), the Nunciature of the Vatican (the Fernández Anchorena Palace), the French Embassy (former Ortiz Basualdo Palace), the Brazilian Embassy (former Pereda Palace), the Jockey Club, and the luxurious Alvear Palace Hotel. All over Recoleta, petits hôtels which contrast with larger and more modern apartment buildings, still grace the neighborhood.

Some of the work of the noteworthy architect, Clorindo Testa, is in Recoleta. Of importance is the National Library, the Buenos Aires Design center, and the building of the new Colegio de Escribanos de Buenos Aires (School of Legal Notaries of Buenos Aires) on Las Heras Avenue.

Additionally, on the side streets of the neighborhood, there is a large number of rental properties of more practical design, whose compact structure and austere appearance contrast with the predominantly neoclassic style of much of Recoleta.

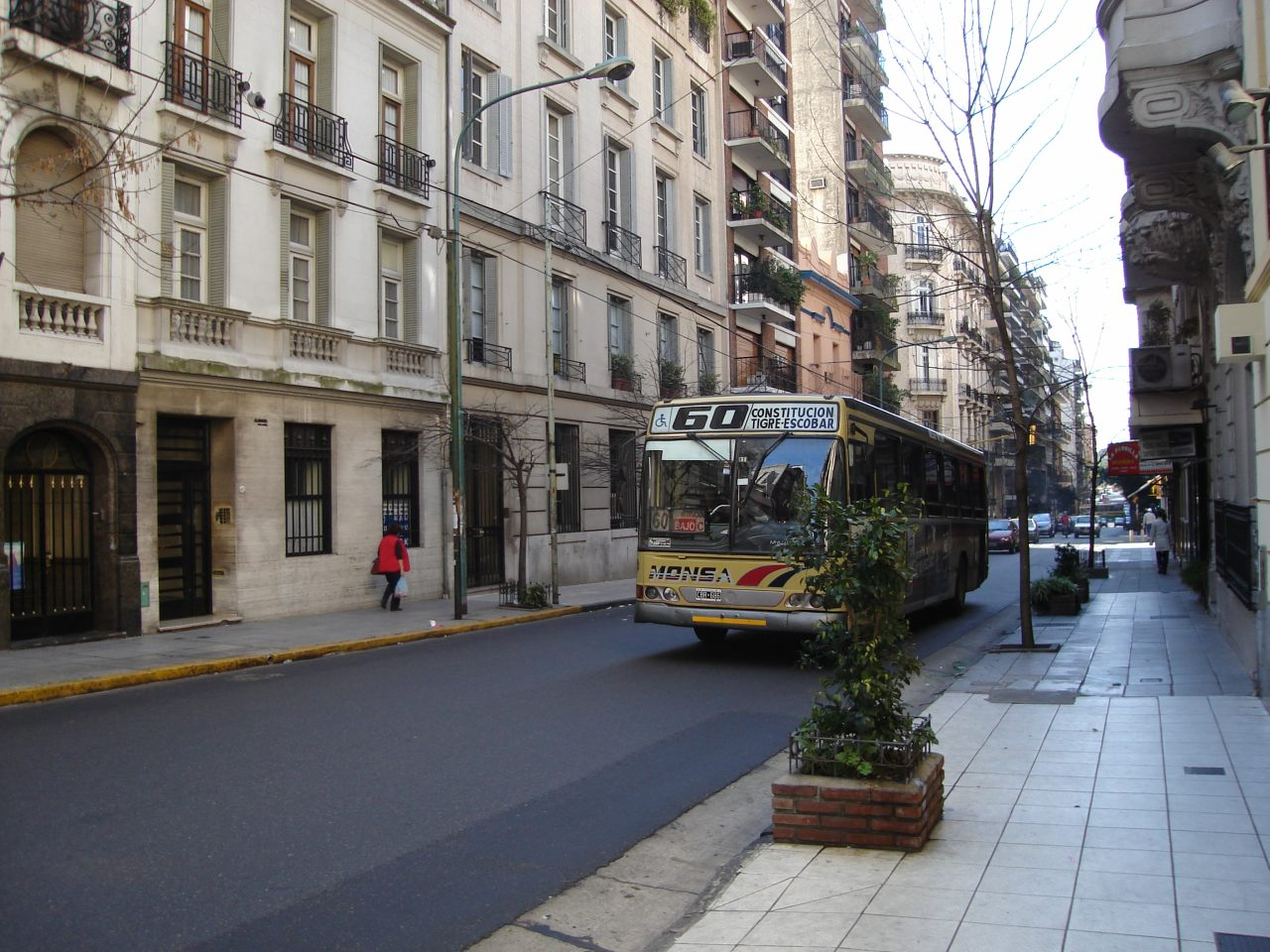
Junin street, typical of the streets in Recoleta and adjacent Barrio Norte

One particular area of Recoleta, bounded by Agüero, Córdoba, Mario Bravo, Soler, Sánchez de Bustamante, and Mansilla streets, is not normally considered to be a part of the Recoleta neighborhood, but rather belonging to the Palermo area. This may be due to fact that it displays a more recent design style than the average area of Recoleta, and of a visibly inferior quality of construction. For that reason, it is one of the more economical areas of the neighborhood, although some residents may not realize that they do in fact reside in Recoleta.

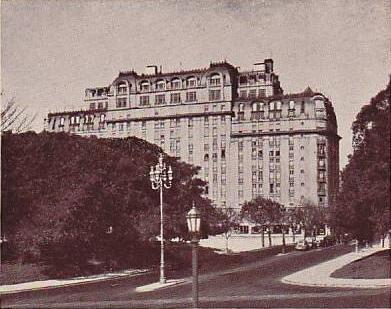
Hotel Alvear Palace in the 1930s

Unlike other areas of Recoleta, the only historic structure in this particular portion of the neighborhood is the Ricardo Gutiérrez Children's Hospital. The main wing of this hospital retains the features that it had a century ago, and it is located on the corner of Paraguay and Gallo Streets.

== Green spaces ==
Although a large portion of Recoleta has been developed, it still possesses many green spaces. Among them are Plaza Rubén Darío, Plaza República Oriental del Uruguay, Plaza República Chile, Plaza Francia, Plaza Intendente Alvear, Plaza Dante Alighieri, United Nations Square and Plazoleta Raúl Soldi. Plaza Vicente López y Planes, recently enhanced, is found at the intersection of Montevideo and Paraná Streets.

Recoleta was the site of an amusement park, Italpark, from 1960 until its closure in 1990. The current Parque Thays stands on the land that it once occupied. Along Córdoba Avenue, the western edge of the neighborhood, are two parks: Plaza Bernardo Houssay, filled with university students, artisans, and resellers of academic textbooks, and Plaza Monseñor De Andrea, at the intersection of Córdoba and Jean Jaurés Street, is a neighborhood area distinctive for its more everyday feel, where petits-hotels and grand buildings leave space for small homes, grocery stores and shops.

Of particular note, in the Plaza Francia facing the cemetery is an enormous rubber tree; its huge tentacle-like lower branches cast shade over La Biela's popular terrace. Known as the Gran Gomero, it was planted in 1791 by Martín José Altolaguirre, the owner of these lands back in that time, and is 50 meters wide.

=== Plaza Francia ===
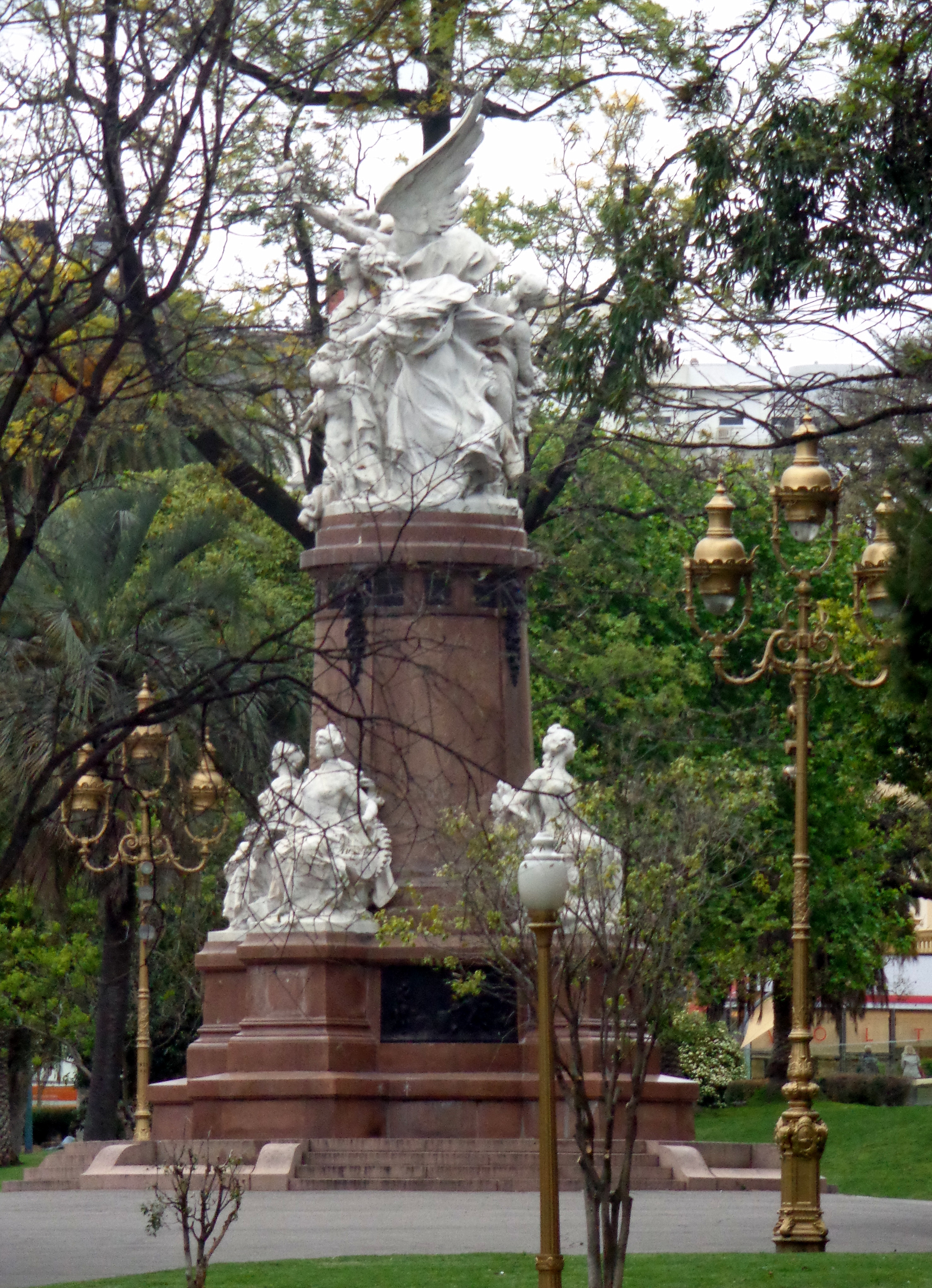
"France to Argentina", monument donated by the French government on Argentina's Centennial in 1910, located in Plaza Francia

Facing the cemetery and the cultural center, is the Plaza Intendente Alvear, mistakenly, but commonly known as Plaza Francia. The plaza became famous in the 1960s for its street fair, popularly called the “feria hippie.” Over time, in addition to artisans and craftspeople, the fair has attracted street vendors and merchants of a wide variety of merchandise.

At present, the Government of the City of Buenos Aires has reorganized the fair, encouraging the participation of those artisans whose work is original and authentic, and discouraging those whose merchandise is of low quality or those who simply sell mass-produced items. The artisans, led by the organization, Interferias, must pass an evaluation process and be registered. Visitors to the fair may find all kinds of handicraft items, many of them of high quality: leather goods, book restoration, sandals and espadrilles, carved mates, ethnic jewelry, incense, essential oils, spices, satchels, candles, indigenous musical instruments, photography, and much more.

== Famous residents of Recoleta ==
Of the important residents of the Recoleta neighborhood, the writers Adolfo Bioy Casares and Silvina Ocampo stand out. Perhaps even better known is Jorge Luis Borges, who lived on Quintana Avenue and was, for many years, the Director of the Biblioteca Nacional. He is, arguably, the single most influential and world-renowned Argentine writer. José Ortega y Gasset also lived for a time on Quintana Avenue. In the 1930s, Cardinal Eugenio Pacelli, later known to the world as Pope Pius XII, lived in a sumptuous residence on Alvear Avenue.

The American actor Guy Williams lived and died in the neighborhood.

In the past, the Argentine president's residence was located at the intersection of Agüero Street and Libertador Avenue. After the overthrow of President Juan Perón in 1955, the luxurious residence was demolished, and today, where it stood, now stands the National Library, work of the Italo-Argentine Clorindo Testa.

Other contemporary residents who have lent local color to the neighborhood are the comedian Carlos Balá and the iconoclastic musician Charly García.

== Image gallery ==
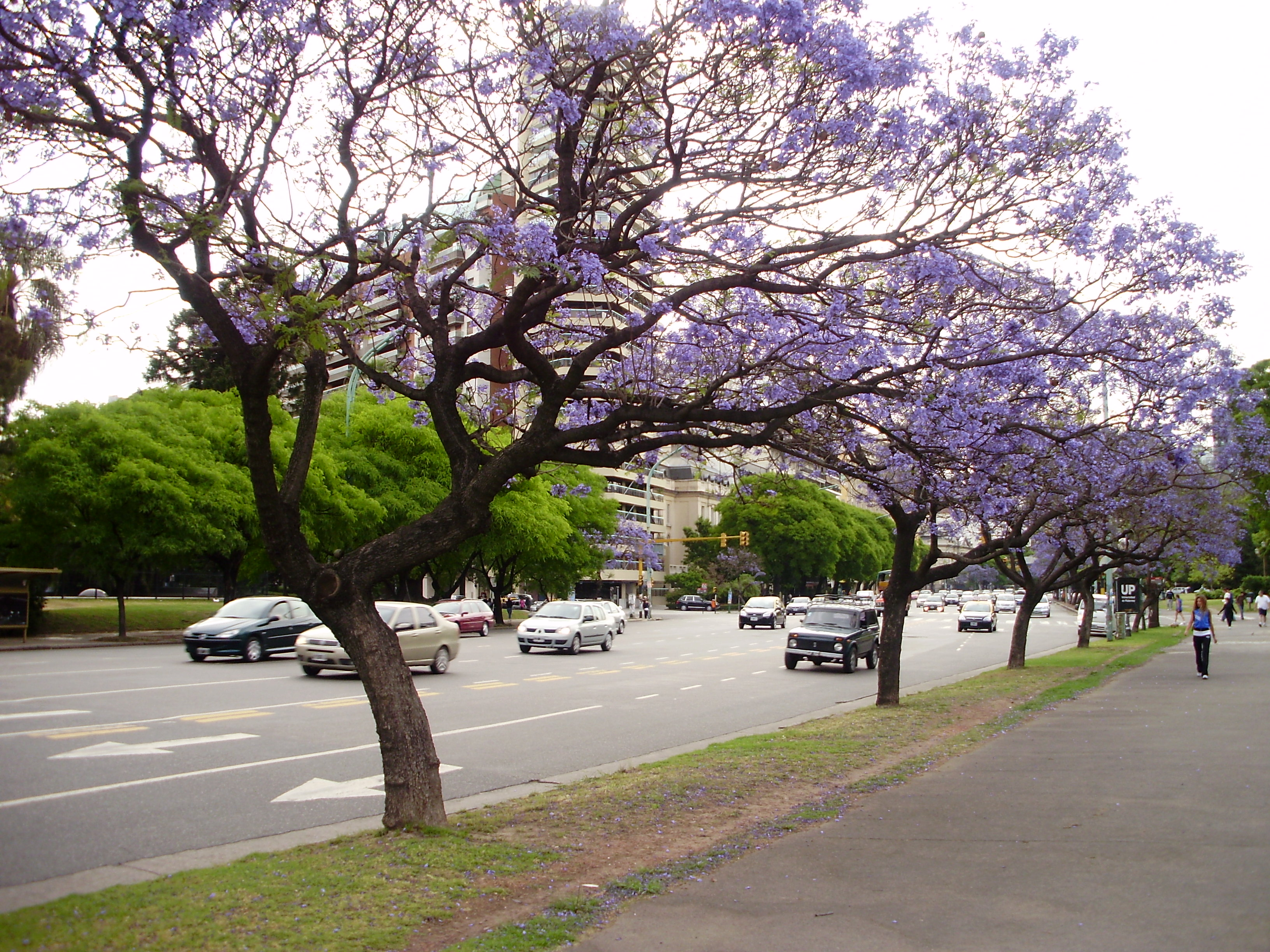
Libertador Avenue

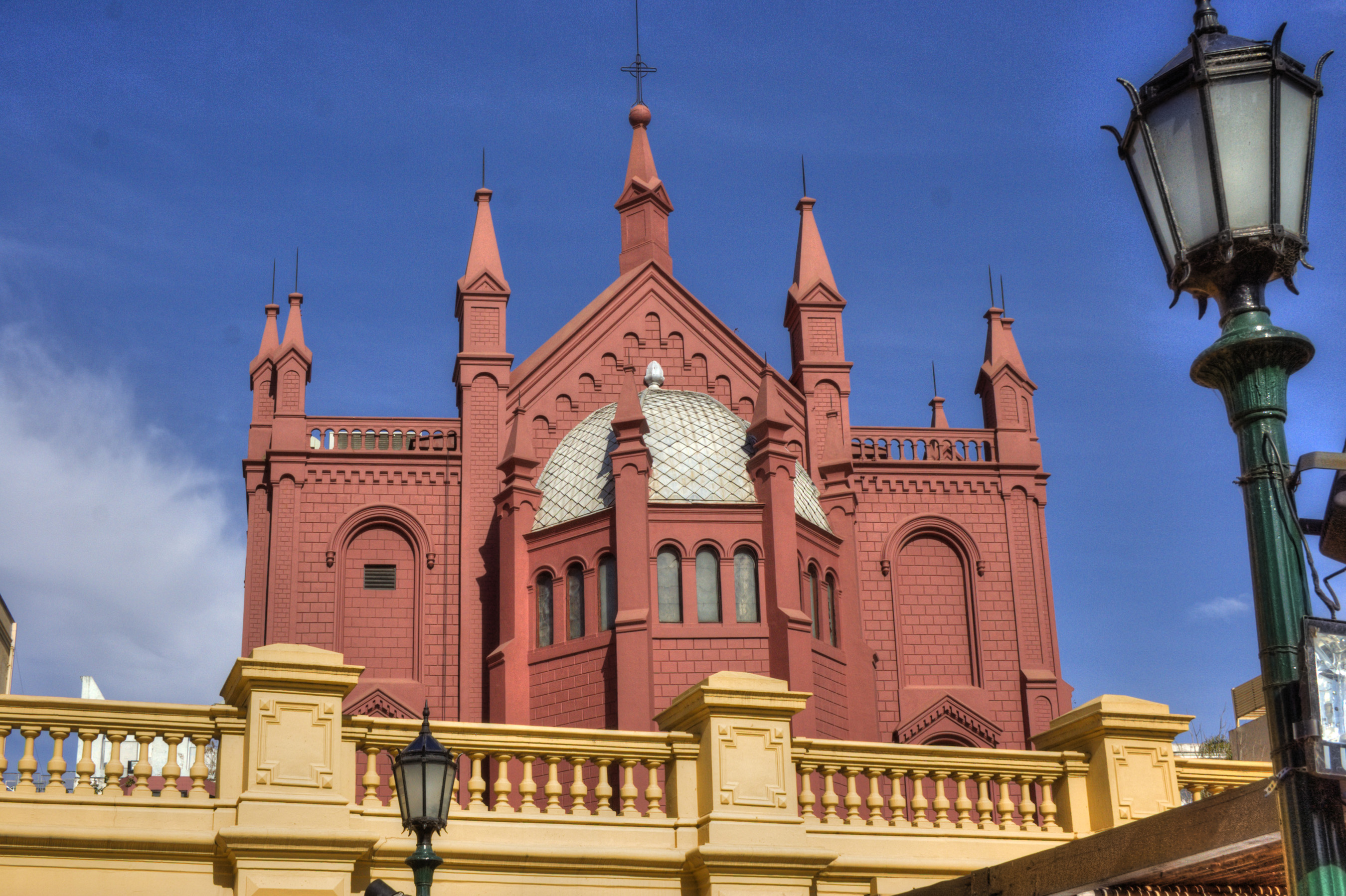
Chapel of the Centro Cultural Recoleta

Nuestra Señora del Pilar Church

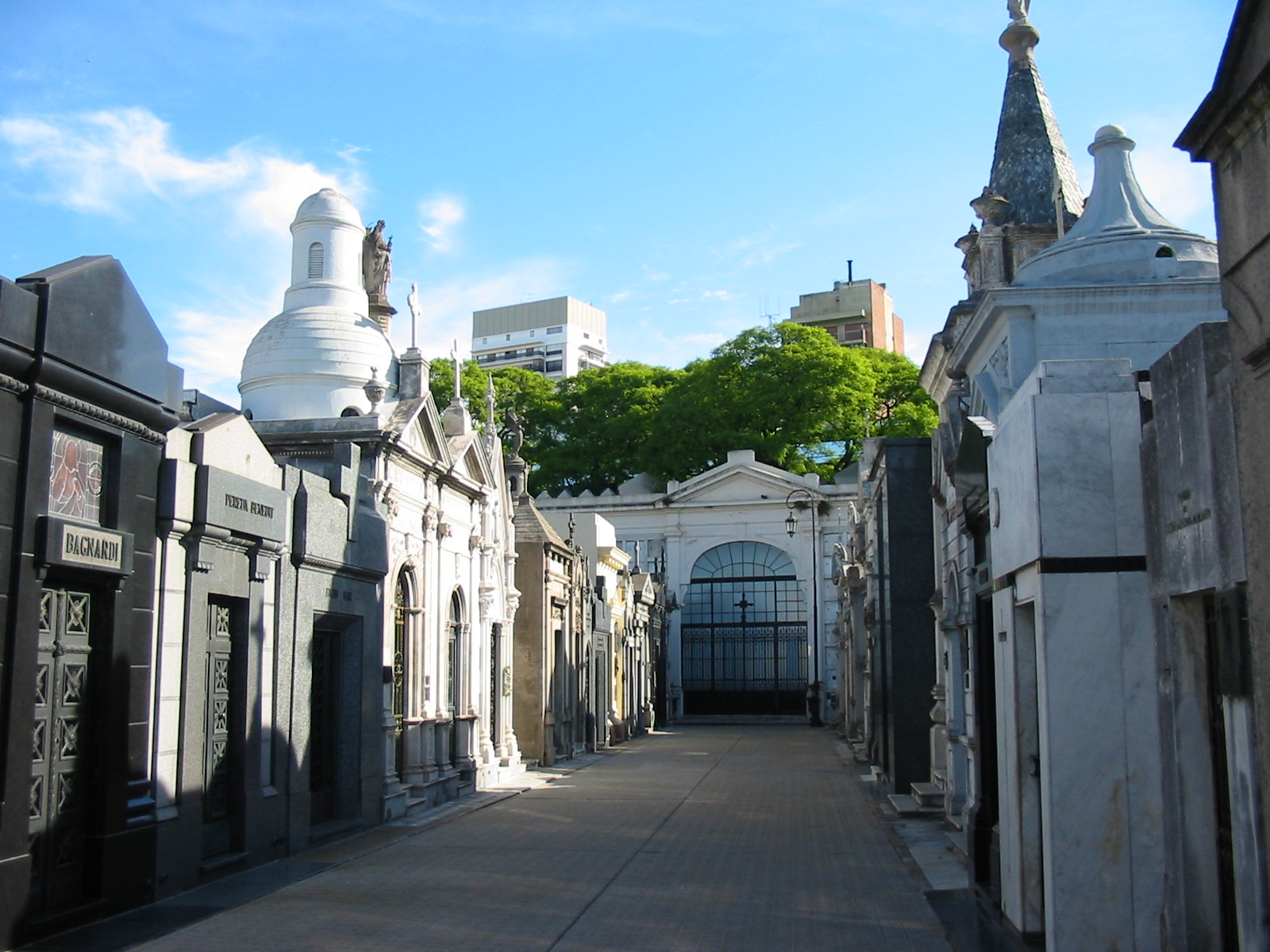
Recoleta Cemetery

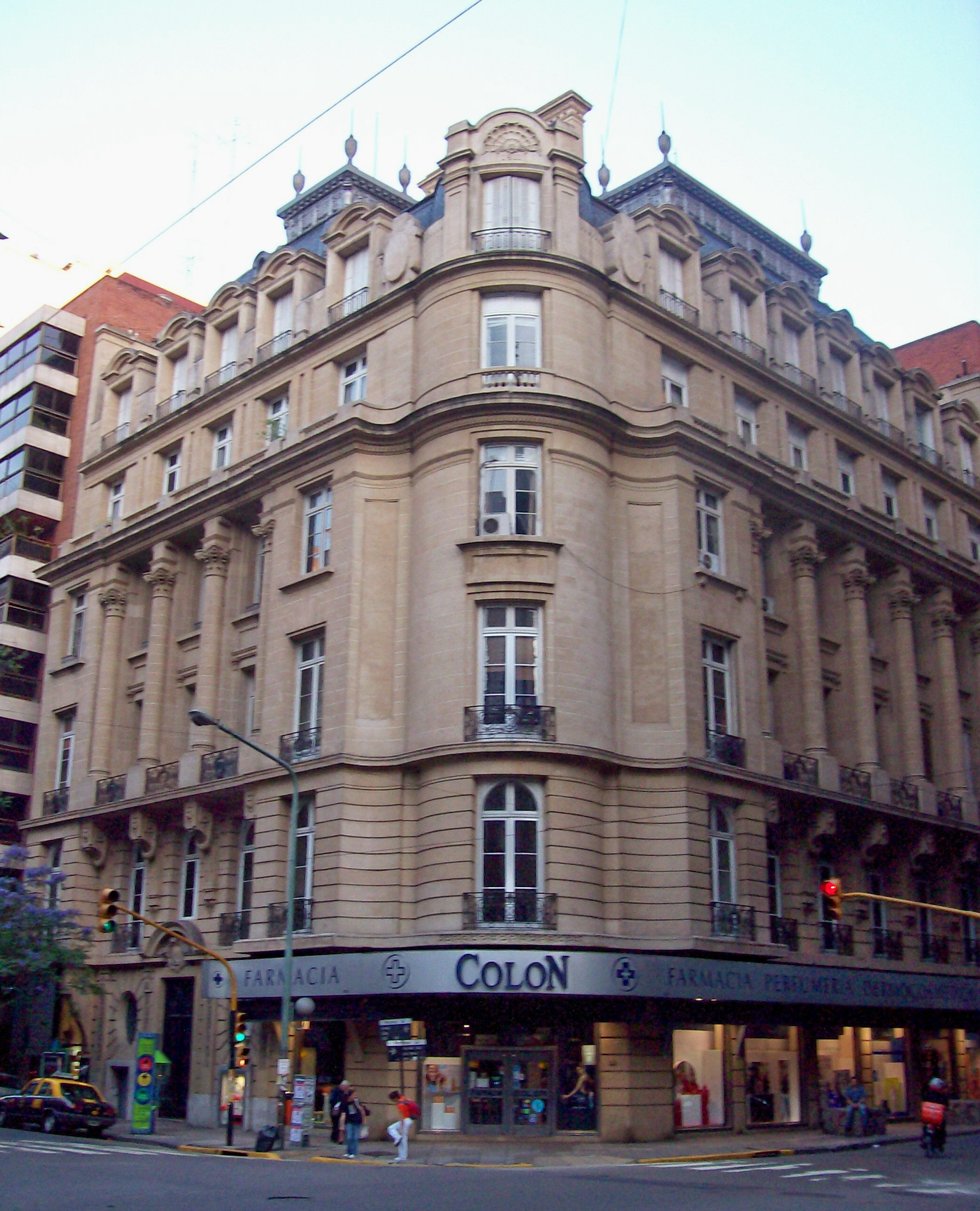
Las Heras Avenue

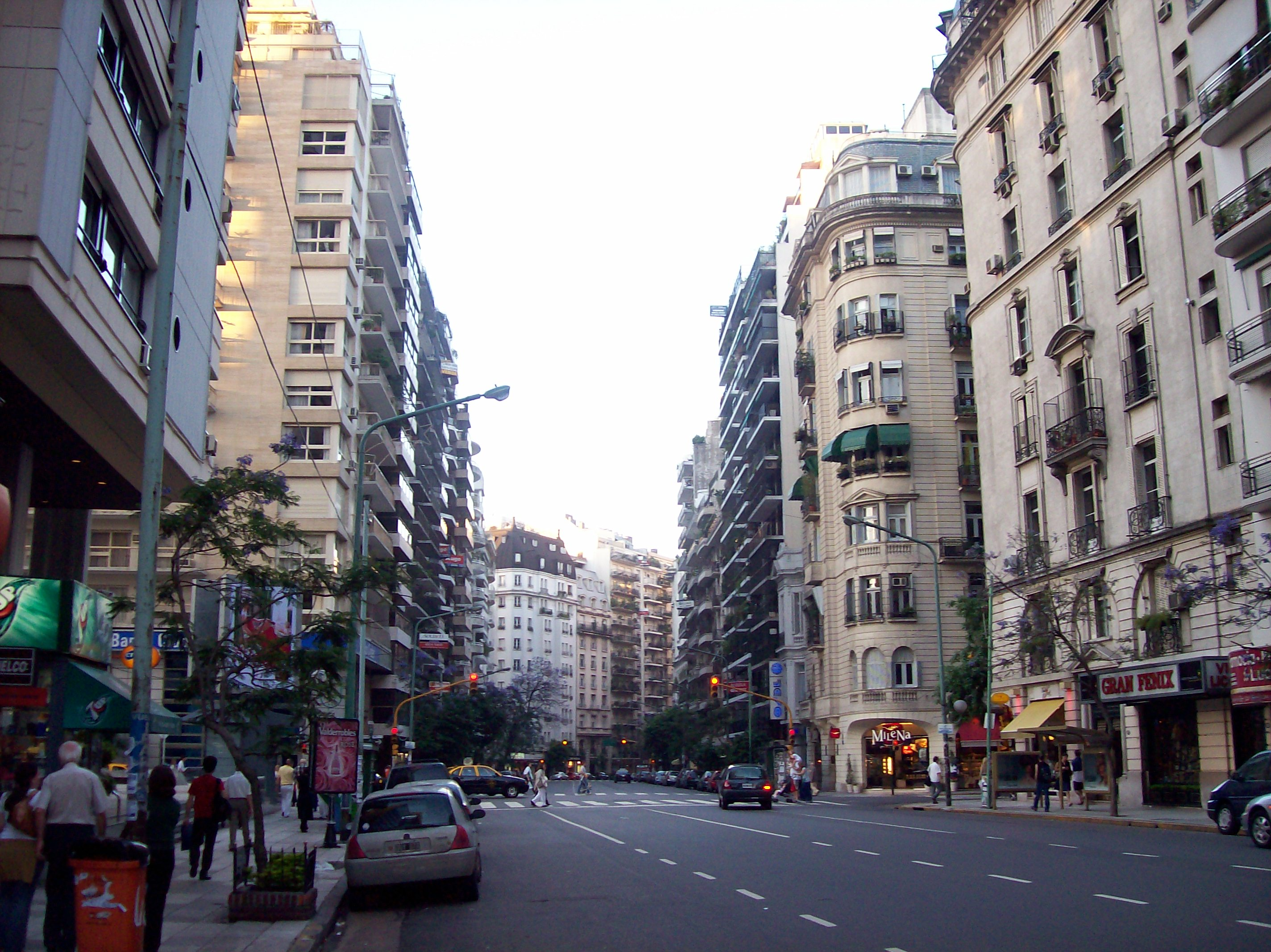
Callao Avenue

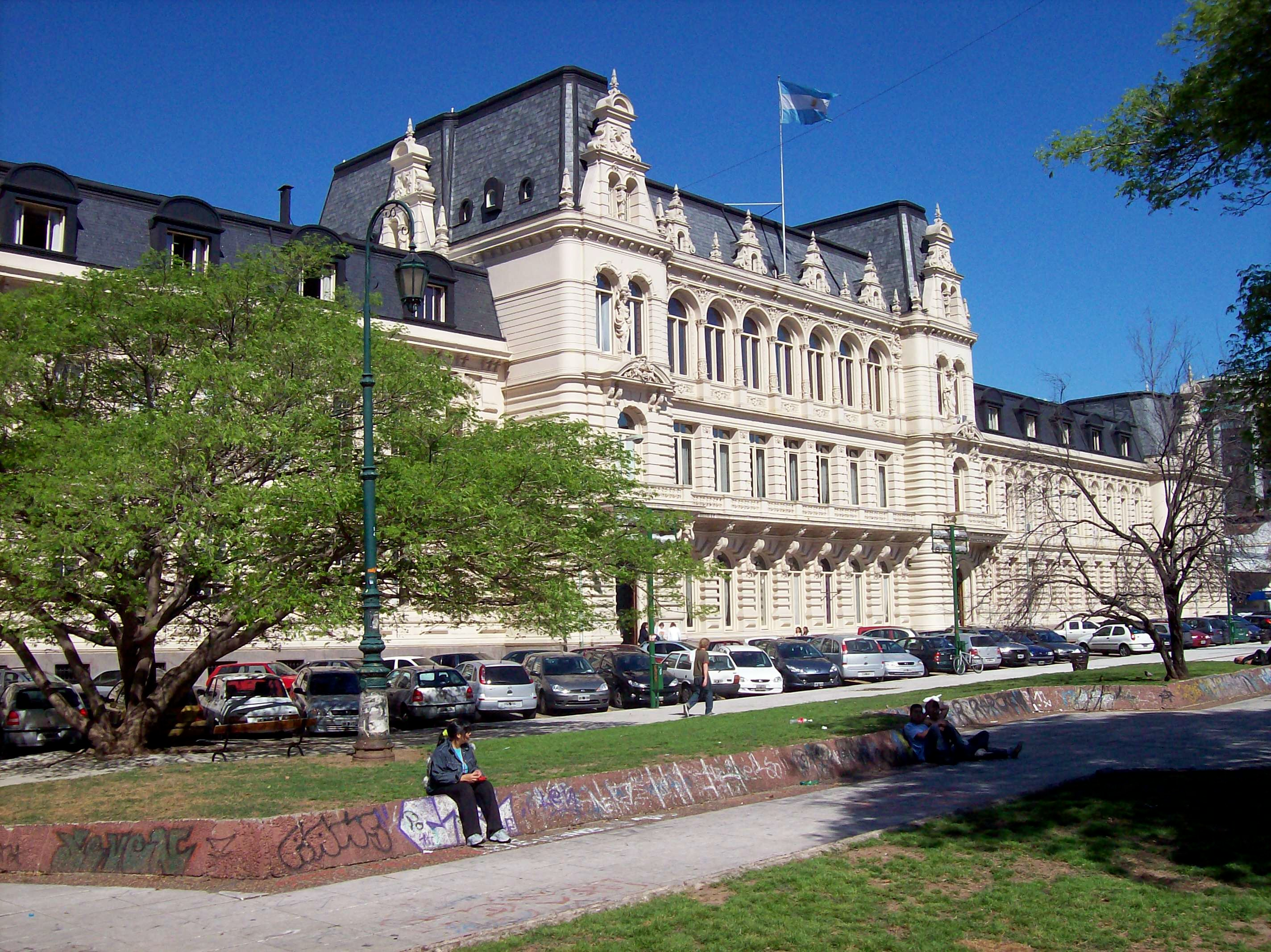
The Pizzurno Palace (Ministry of Education)

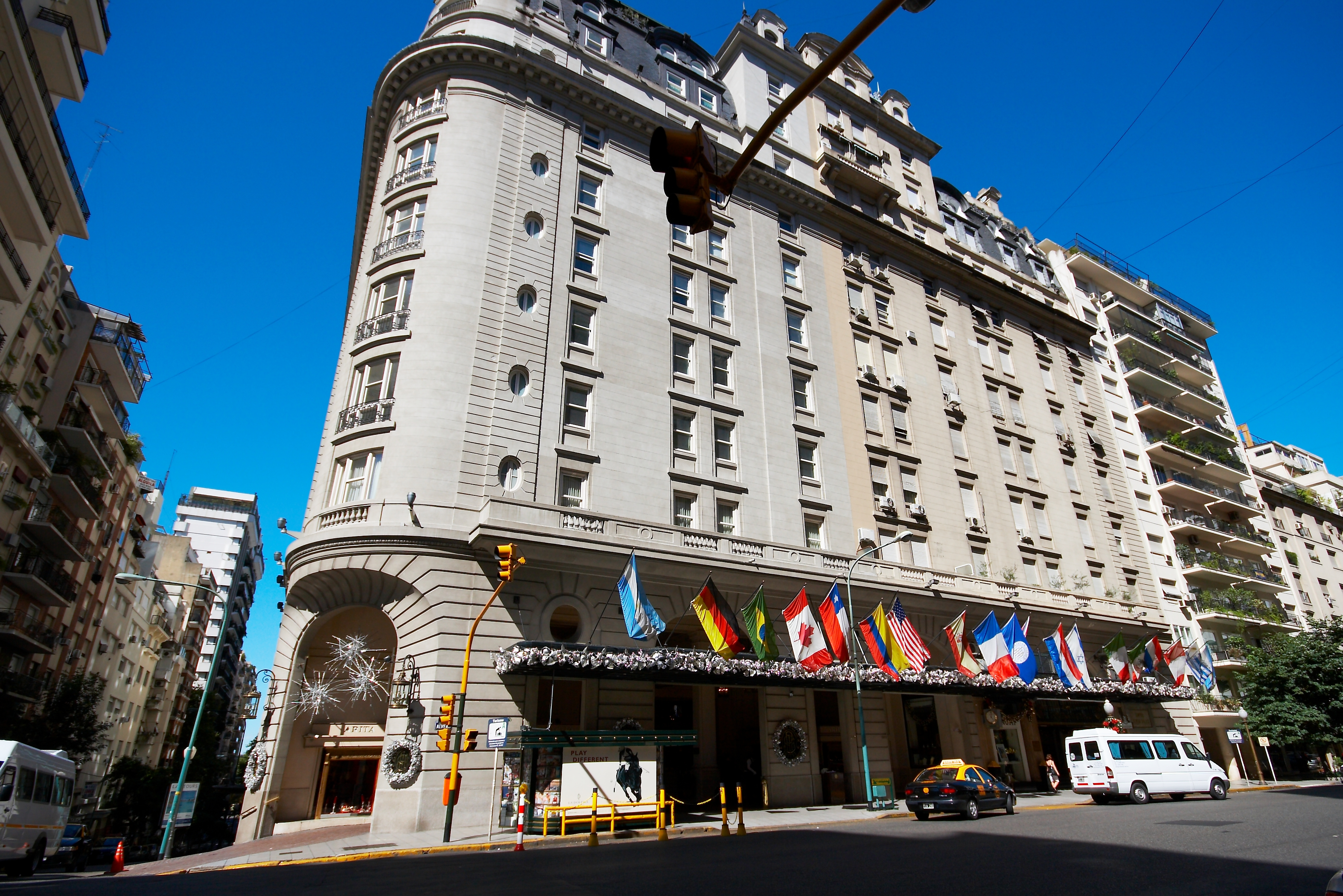
Alvear Palace Hotel

La Biela Café

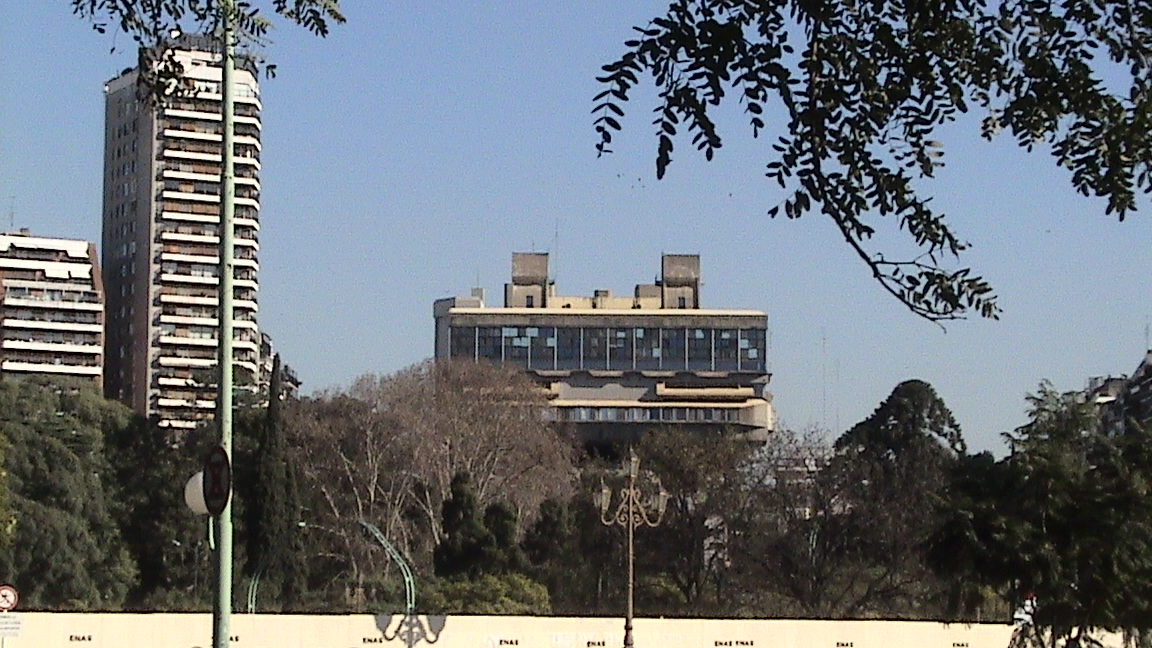
National Library

Monument to Guillermo Rawson

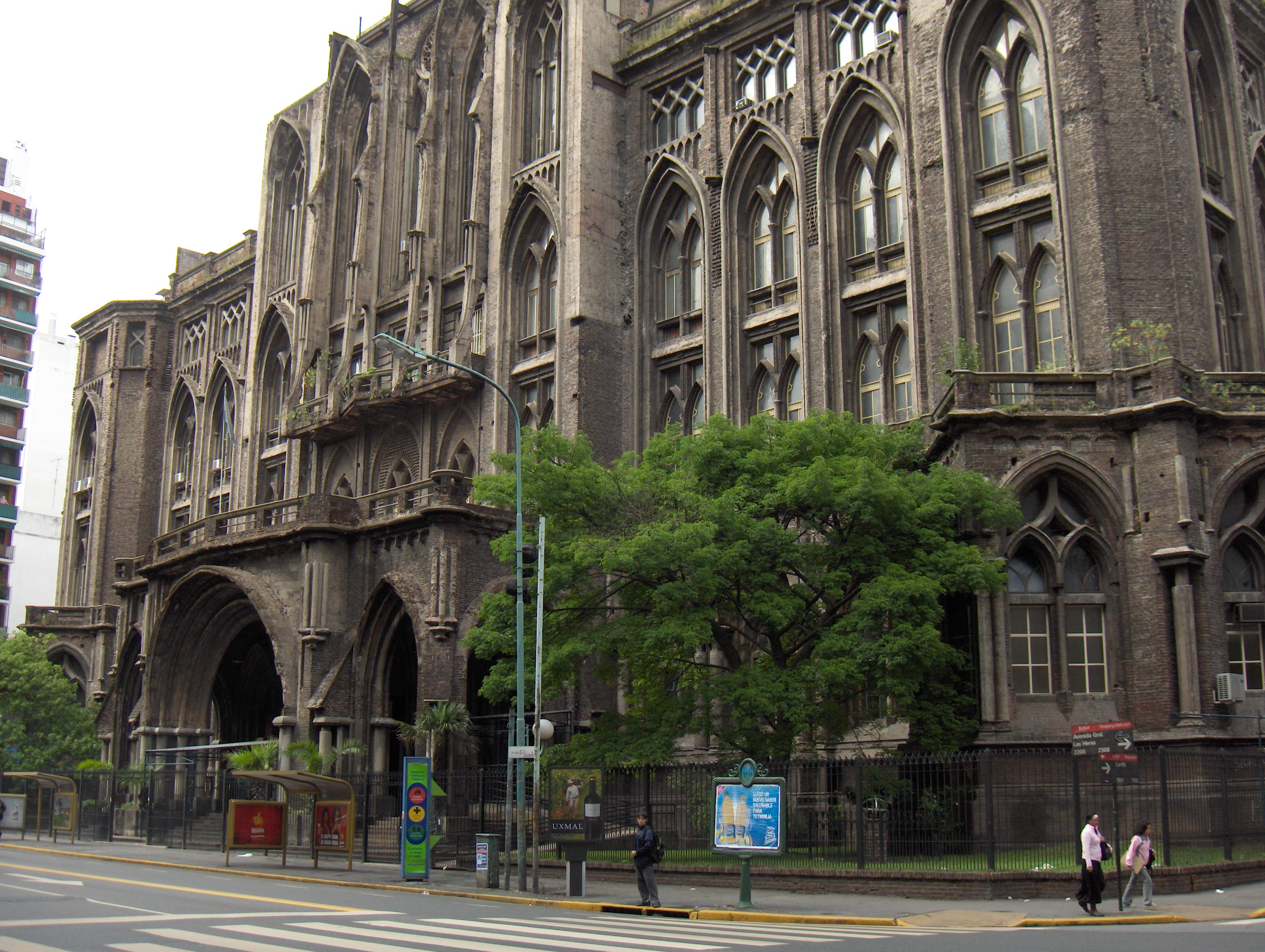
Faculty of Engineering (Las Heras Ave. branch)

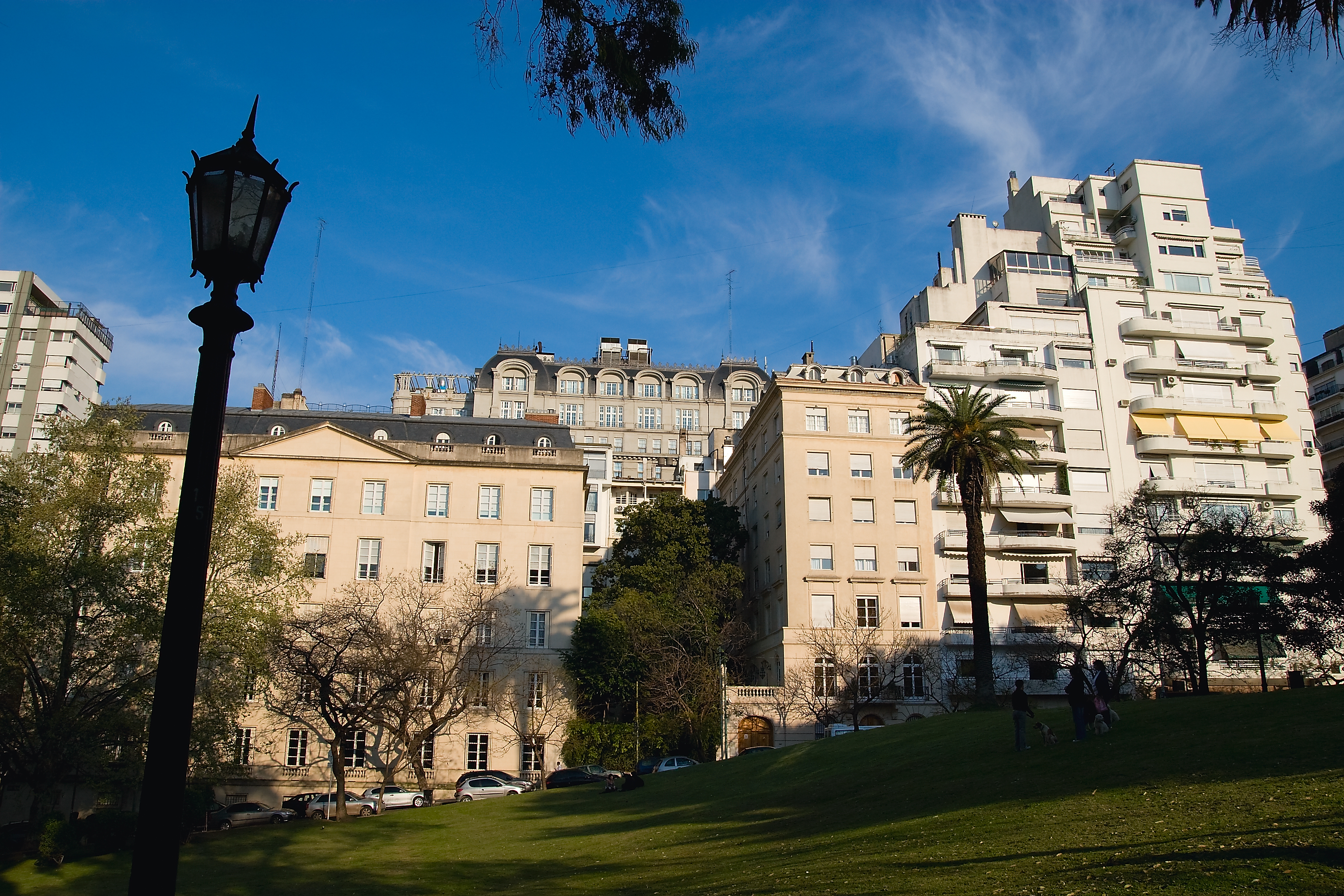
Plaza San Martín de Tours

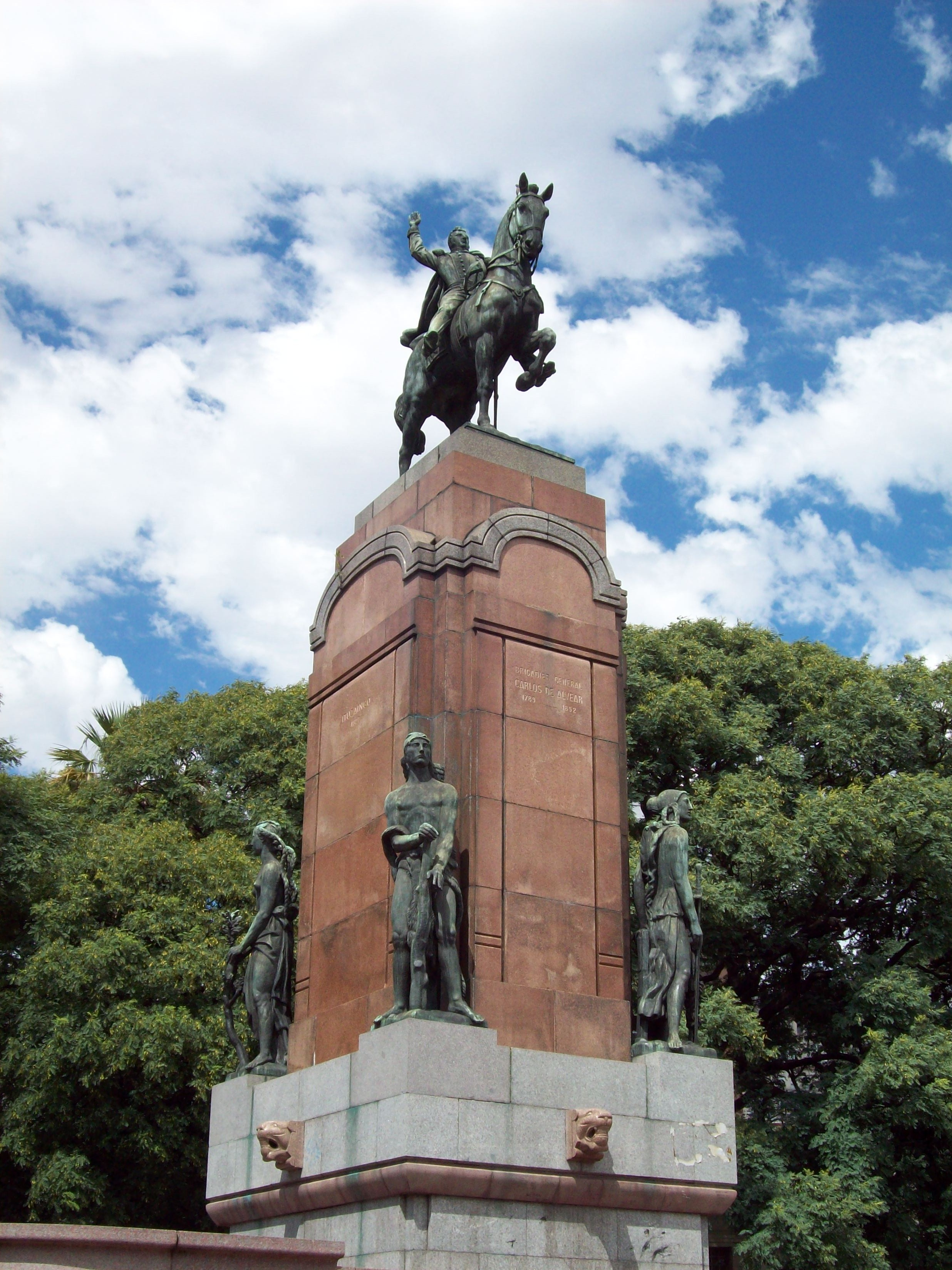
Monument to General Carlos M. de Alvear
