= Plaza Vicente López y Planes =

City square in Buenos Aires, Argentina

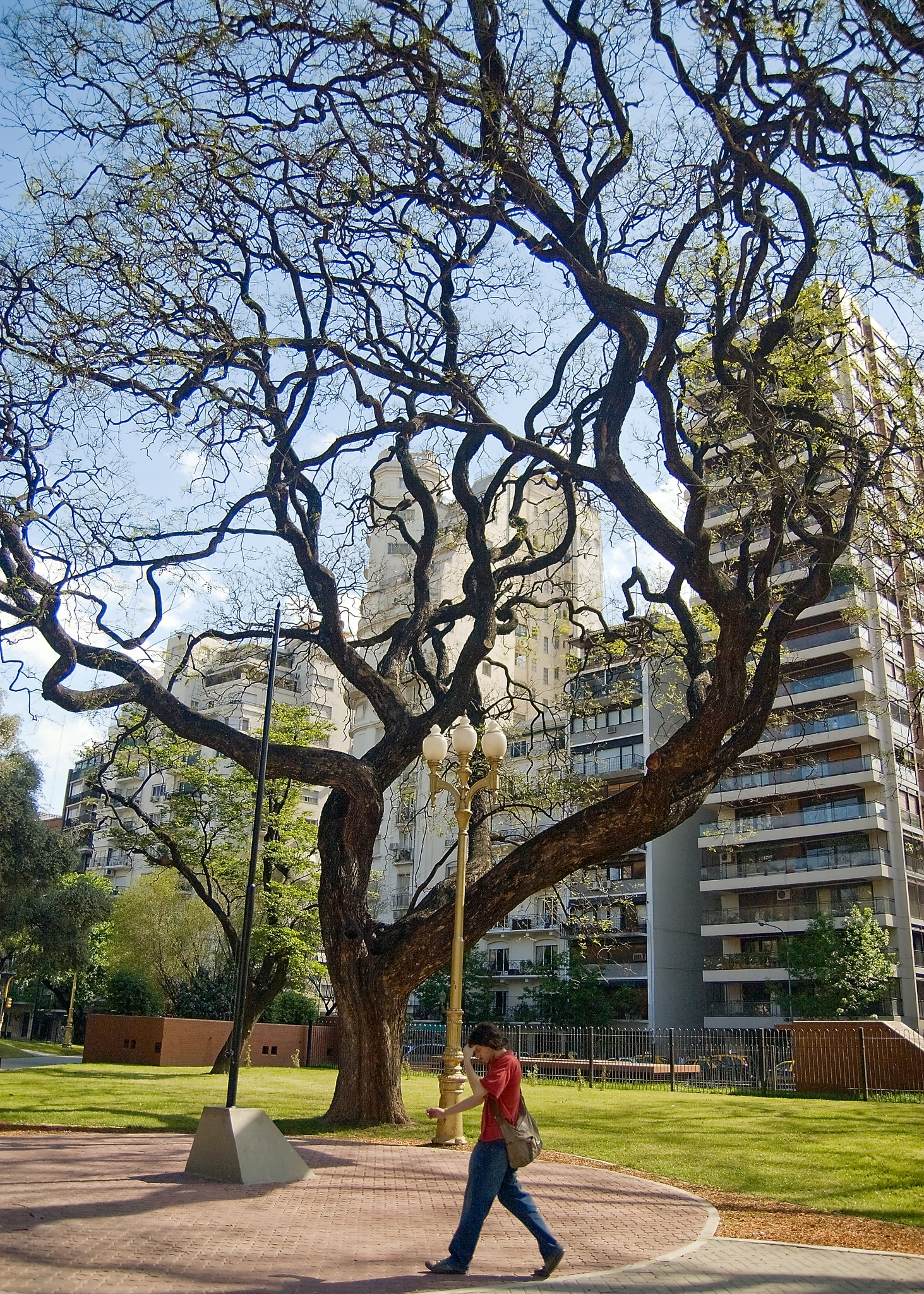

The Plaza Vicente López y Planes is a public space in Recoleta, Buenos Aires, Argentina bounded by Paraná, Montevideo, Arenales and Juncal Vicente Lopez streets.

The square honors the author of the Argentine national anthem, Vicente López y Planes. His image is flanked by high and very flowery spring trees of the broads and jacaranda species, bearing within it a great ombú following urban design and landscape requirements Carlos Thays who, despite being born in France, became a naturalized Argentine and preferred that the streets, squares and locals parks had local flora rather than imported plants.

The square is of moderate size (if not smaller) then you have a plant that takes an almost triangular in appearance having its northeast end the beginning Las Heras avenue. Rge condition of the square was restored in 2007.

One of the peculiarities of this place is that she was walking in the 1909 Santiago Ramón Estrada singing some of his songs that would later come to national scenarios of greater importance.

About the Parish Montevideo street commonly called "The Slave" (Sacred Heart of Jesus) Church officially stands and Eucharistic Heart of Jesus. Beautiful eclectic building in which Gothic and Romanesque details predominate built between the late nineteenth and early twentieth century as a votive gift from a wealthy family in the order of nuns called Handmaids of the Sacred Heart of Jesus.
