= Workers' control =

Participation in management by employees

Workers' control is participation in the management of factories and other commercial enterprises by the people who work there. It has been variously advocated by anarchists, socialists (notably Trotskyists), communists, social democrats, distributists and Christian democrats, and has been combined with various socialist and mixed economy systems.

Workers' councils are a form of workers' control. Council communism, such as in the early Soviet Union, advocates workers' control through workers' councils and factory committees. Syndicalism advocates workers' control through trade unions. Guild socialism advocates workers' control through a revival of the guild system. Participatory economics represents a recent variation on the idea of workers' control.

Workers' control can be contrasted to control of the economy via the state, such as nationalization and central planning (see state socialism) versus control of the means of production by owners, which workers can achieve through employer provided stock purchases, direct stock purchases, etc., as found in capitalism.

== Historical examples by country ==
=== Algeria ===
During the Algerian Revolution, peasants and workers took control of factories, farms and offices that were abandoned, with the help of UGTA militants. Around 1,000 enterprises were placed under workers' control in 1962, with that number climbing to 23,000+ in the following years. The FLN passed laws in the newly independent Algeria which partially institutionalized workers' control, creating a bureaucracy around workers' councils that centralized them. This caused massive corruption among new managers as well productivity and enthusiasm in the project to fall, leading to numerous strikes by workers in protest. Following a military coup in 1965, workers' control efforts were sabotaged by the government which began to centralize the economy in the hands of the state, denying workers control.

=== Argentina ===
In 1973, with the end of the self-proclaimed Argentine Revolution, there was a wave of strikes and workplace occupations that rocked the country as the first elections were held, mainly in state-owned industry. 500 occupations of workplaces were taken out overall, with 350 occurring between the 11th and 15 June, mostly of media outlets, health centres and public transport and government administration. These occupations were predominantly done in support of Peronism, and failed to achieve any long lasting results on the eve of the Dirty War.

During the Argentine Great Depression, hundreds of workplaces were occupied and ran according to the principles of workers' control by angered unemployed people. In 2014, around 311 of these were still around, being run as worker cooperatives. Some of the notable examples include:

- Brukman textile factory
- FaSinPat
- Hotel Bauen
- Tandanor shipyard

=== Australia ===
In Northern Queensland from 1908 to 1920, the IWW and the Australasian Meat Industry Employees Union organized a degree of workers' control among meat industry workers. From 1971 to 1990, Australia saw a massive wave of workers' control corresponding with strikes all over the country. Some authors have argued that the green bans constitute a form of workers' control. Including:

- 1971: Harco Work-In
- 1972: Clutha Development Mine Work-In
- 1972: Sydney Opera House Work-In
- 1972: Whyalla Glove Factory Work-In
- 1974: Wyong Plaza Work-In
- 1975: Nymboida Mine Work-In
- 1975: Coal Cliff Work-In
- 1978: Sanyo Television Factory Work-In
- 1979: Union Carbide Work-In
- 1980: Department of Social Security Work-In
- 1990: Melbourne Tramworkers' Strike

=== Bosnia and Herzegovina ===
In 2015, workers took over a detergent factory that was on the verge of bankruptcy, running it as a co-operative.

=== Brazil ===
Around 70 bankrupted enterprises have been taken over by about 12,000 workers since 1990 as part of the recovered factories movement, mainly in the industries of metallurgy, textiles, shoemaking, glasswork, ceramics and mining. This has been concentrated in the South and Southeast of Brazil.

=== Canada ===
In 1981, workers took over BC Telephones' phone exchanges for five days in protest of layoffs and increased deskilling of work.

=== Chile ===
During the presidency of Salvador Allende (1970–1973) 31 factories were placed under workers' control in a system called Cordón industrial before being destroyed by Augusto Pinochet.

=== China ===
Workers' control was practiced in Guangzhou in the 1920s and the Shinmin Autonomous Region from 1929 to 1931.

=== Costa Rica ===
From 1968 to 1991, there were several workplace and takeovers (mainly in agriculture) that were repressed by the state. Little knowledge exists of these in English.

=== Czechoslovakia ===
Workers' control occurred during the Prague Spring, by January 1969 there were councils in about 120 enterprises, representing more than 800,000 employees, or about one-sixth of the country’s workers. They were banned in May 1970 and subsequently declined.

=== Egypt ===
Before the Egyptian Revolution of 2011, several factories were placed under workers' control.

=== France ===
In 1871, the Paris Commune placed 43 enterprises under workers' control as one of the first experiments in modern socialism. Another famous example of workers' control is the LIP clock factory, which was occupied in 1973 and operated as a worker cooperative.

=== Germany ===
Germany has a history of "Mitbestimmung" (Codetermination) since 1891 (see Codetermination in Germany). The Weimar Republic required workers' consultative committees in every business employing 20 people, which the Nazi government abolished. Works councils were authorized by the Allied Control Council in 1946 and required by the West German government in 1952; codetermination has been mandatory in all large companies (2,000 employees) since 1976.

=== Greece ===
In the early 1980s, two textile factories were taken over by their workers after going bankrupt. In the early 2010s, various workers took over a building materials factory, newspaper, radio station and hospital.

=== Indonesia ===
During the Indonesian National Revolution, railway, plantation and factory workers across Java implemented workers' control from 1945 to 1946, until it was crushed by the new Indonesian Nationalist Government. In 2007, over a thousand workers in Jakarta inspired by workers' control in Argentina and Venezuela took over a textile factory in response to wage cuts, repression of a recently organized union and efforts to fire and intimidate union organizers.

=== Italy ===
During the Biennio Rosso, workers, especially in Northern Italy, took control of numerous factories. In 2012, workers took over an office and former car factory, turning it into a recycling plant.

=== Japan ===
During the Allied Occupation of Japan, around 100,000 workers took over 133 workplaces as a form of industrial dispute called production control. Coal mines, shoe factories, hospitals, government offices, steel works and newspapers were the main sites taken over.

=== Poland ===
Workers' control had been practiced in Poland during the Revolution of 1905, as workers protested a lack of political freedoms and poor working conditions. Workers' control also occurred in around 100 industries in the aftermath of World War I with around 500,000 participants. Notably in the short-lived Republic of Tarnobrzeg. As World War II was ending, workers took over abandoned and damaged factories and began running them between 1944 and 1947.

=== Russia and Soviet Union ===
Between the Revolutions in 1917, instruments of worker representation rose up, called the Soviets. On 27 November 1917, the Council of People's Commissars (SNK) implemented a decree on workers' control.

The USSR experimented with workers' control with the Kuzbass Autonomous Industrial Colony thanks to the influence from IWW from 1922 to 1926 before being destroyed by the government.

=== Spain ===
During the Spanish Revolution of 1936, workers' control in anarchist-controlled areas was widespread, with workers' control being practiced in factories, farms, docks, ships, utilities, railways, trams and hospitals.

=== Sri Lanka ===
Workers' control was practiced in the Ceylon Transport Board from 1958 to 1978 with about 7,000 buses and 50,000 workers.

=== Syria ===
Workers' control has been practiced in several cities and towns during the Syrian Civil War since 2012 as they maintain agriculture, run hospitals and maintain basic social services in the lack of a state. Workers' control is also practiced in Rojava, with around a third of all industry being placed under workers' control as of 2015.

=== Tanzania ===
Workers' control was practiced in several factories and hotels during a strike wave from 1972 to 1973 over anger at the ineffective workers committees, although the government of Julius Nyerere initially supported the factory takeovers, it later repressed them, with some analysts arguing it was a form of co-optation.

=== Ukraine ===
Workers' control was practiced by the Makhnovshchina in both factories and farms from 1918 to 1921, when it was crushed by the Red Army.

=== United Kingdom ===
Workers' control was first practiced by the Diggers, who took over abandoned farm land and formed autonomous collectives during the English Civil War. In the 1970s, around 260 episodes of workers' control were witnessed across the UK, including:

- 1971: Upper Clyde Shipbuilders
- 1971: Plessey armaments factory near Glasgow
- 1972: Sexton, Son and Everard shoe factories in East Anglia
- 1972: Briant Colour Printing in East London
- 1972: Leadgate Engineering in Durham
- 1972: Fisher-Bendix motor components factory near Liverpool
- 1972: Bredbury Steelworks near Manchester
- 1972: Stanmore Engineering in London
- Unknown: Triumph Engineering
- Unknown: Elisabeth Garret Anderson hospital
- Unknown: Hounslow Hospital

=== United States ===
Workers' control was practiced in Seattle in 1919, as workers organized milk deliveries, cafeterias, firefighting and laundry before being suppressed by the government. From 1968 to 1972, General Electric experimented with workers' control in River Works, Massachusetts to great success.

=== Yugoslavia ===
In Yugoslavia, there was a limited degree of workers' control of industry which was encoded into law in 1950. This occurred due to the Tito-Stalin Split and inspiration from the Paris Commune. However, the poorly designed, top-down nature of the workers' councils led to corruption, cynicism and inefficiencies until they were destroyed in the Yugoslav Wars.

== See also ==
- Anarcho-syndicalism
- Co-operatives
- Direct democracy
- Inclusive democracy
- Industrial democracy
- Industrial Workers of the World
- Paris Commune of 1871
- Participatory democracy
- Participatory economics
- Trotskyism
- Worker cooperative
- Worker self-management
- Workplace democracy
- Edvard Kardelj
