= Squatting in Argentina =

Argentina on globe, marked in dark green

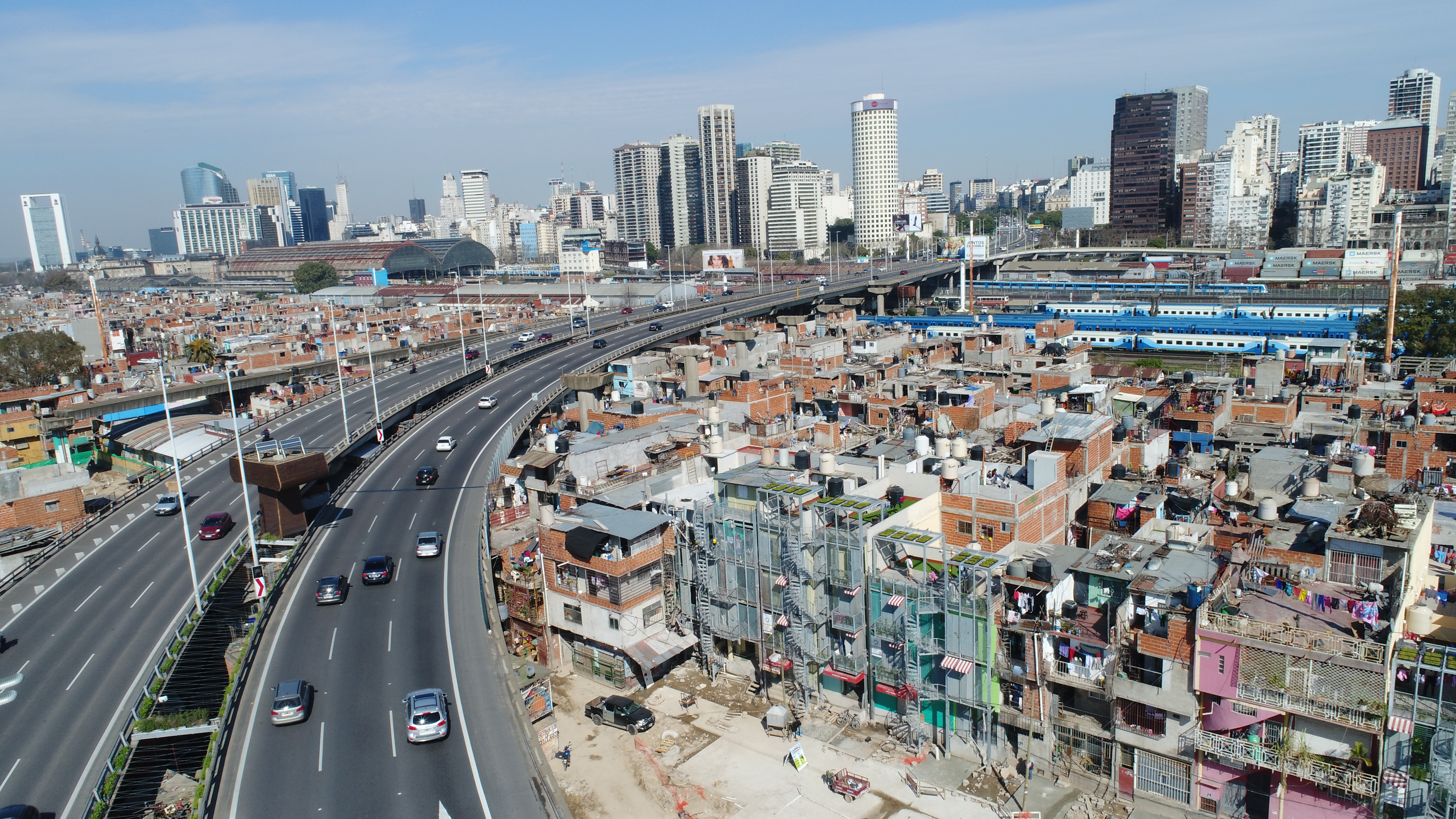
Villa 31 in Buenos Aires, 2017

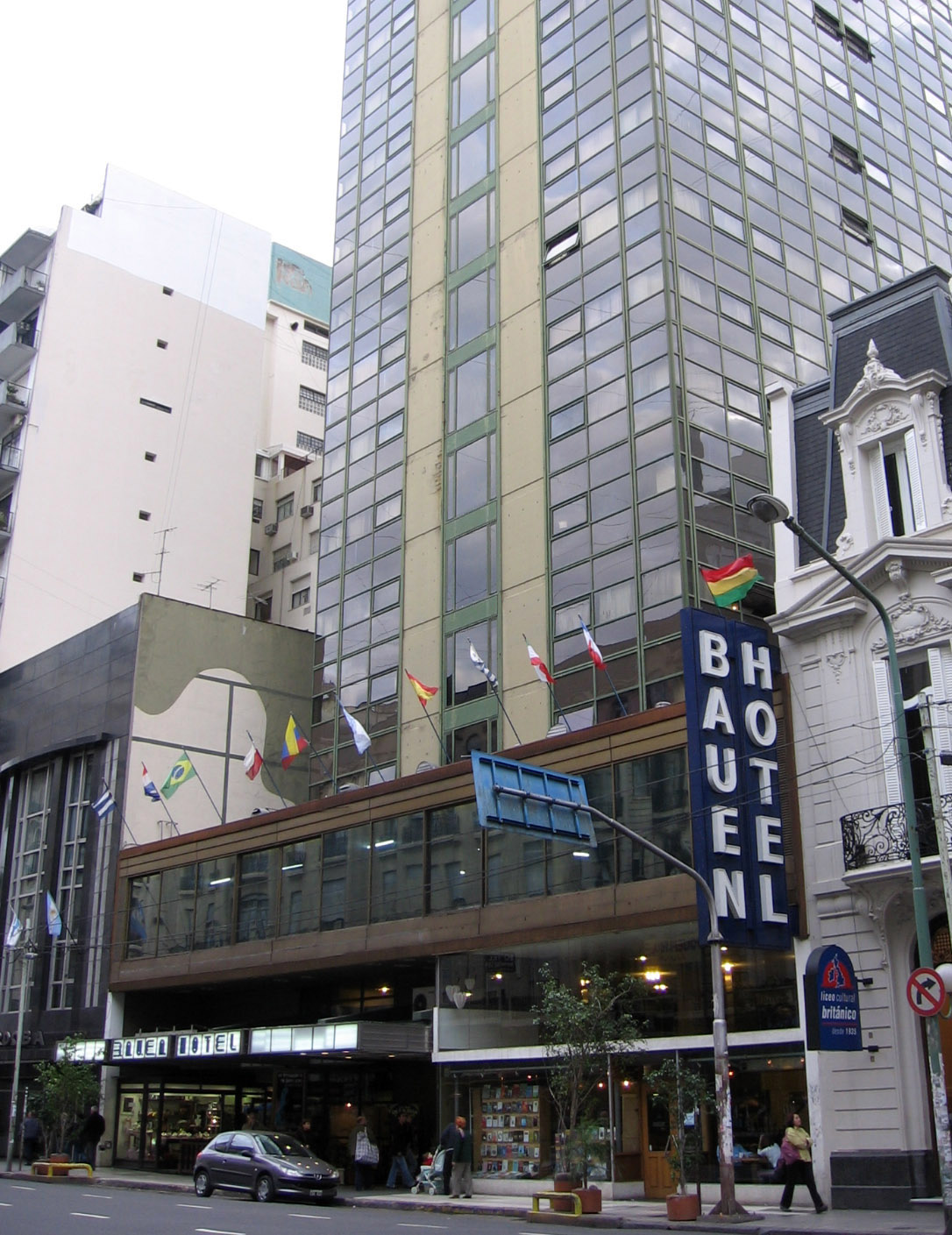
Hotel Bauen in 2006

Squatting in Argentina is the occupation of derelict buildings or unused land without the permission of the owner. Shanty towns emerged on the periphery of Buenos Aires from the 1930s onwards and are known as villa miseria. After the 1998–2002 Argentine great depression, 311 worker cooperatives set up across the country as people squatted and re-opened businesses.

== History ==
Buenos Aires began to industrialize from the 1930s onwards and areas such as Villa Paraíso were squatted becoming shanty towns. Villa Paraíso still exists and experiences violence both from local drug-dealers and police raids. It has also received state aid programs such as Plan Vida (Life Plan). In the greater metropolitan area there are squatted informal settlements such as Barrio San Jorge. This had 630 homes and almost 3,000 inhabitants in 1990.

Around 5,000 squatters occupied Parque Indoamericano in Buenos Aires in 2010 as a housing protest. The events quickly became a political scandal. As of 2014, there were 6.5 million Argentinians living in slums known locally as villa miseria. One well-known example is Villa 31 in Buenos Aires, which was founded when Polish migrants occupied derelict railway buildings in the 1930s. By 2019, it was estimated to have 40,000 inhabitants.

During the 1998–2002 Argentine great depression, many businesses closed down. Some were occupied and re-opened by the workers. These projects included Brukman factory, FaSinPat and Hotel Bauen. The worker cooperatives operated under the motto "Occupy. Resist. Produce" and by 2014 there were 311 across the country.
