= The 23 objectives of the Australian Democrats =

The 23 objectives of the Australian Democrats were balloted by the membership in 1997, and represent an attempt through participative democracy to codify the overall policy aims and objectives of the Australian Democrats.

== Background and rationale ==
Participatory democracy was a founding principle for the Australian Democrats. For instance, the inaugural leader Don Chipp stated in 1977 that the Australian Democrats were founded on the premise that members be given the opportunity “for a greater say in the decisions that affect them”, and the importance of participatory democracy is also a theme in Chipp’s 2004 memoirs. Political scientist Anika Gauja writes that the Australian Democrats “strived to present novel opportunities for individual political participation. In contrast to the organisation of the major parties, the membership is intended to be the driving force of the party: formulating policies, selecting office-bearers, pre-selecting parliamentary candidates, and deciding party leadership” Gauja argues that, insofar as the Australian Democrats used membership ballots as the basis of their intra-party decision making, “they represent an unusual example for a party that has sought to promote direct participation in policy development ...” Similarly, researcher Cathy Madden wrote in 2009 that the Australian Democrats “established a practice of participatory democracy unusual in Australian politics” According to Gauja and Madden, the commitment of the Australian Democrats to participatory democracy originated from the new politics movement of the time, which emphasized participation in democratic decision-making, and the existing commitment to participatory decision-making as already established in the Australia Party, an important predecessor to the Australian Democrats. The balloting of the objectives, that is, having objectives formulated, discussed, and voted upon by the membership, was a way of putting this participative democracy into practice, as well as codifying the basic aims and direction of the Australian Democrats. In 1997, the objectives were formulated, discussed, voted upon, and duly published. In subsequent years there were at times differing interpretations within the Democrats as to how the 23 objectives were to be interpreted and applied, although, in his 2004 memoir, Don Chipp vigorously defends the right of individuals within the Australian Democrats to reach differing interpretations of the objectives as a rightful function of conscience.

== Coverage ==
The 23 objectives cover a range of policy issues, including animal rights, the arts, education, the environment, health, inclusivity, income security, indigenous rights, individual enterprise, industrial democracy, media policy, national planning, participatory democracy, peace and international cooperation, political independence, population, political values, sustainability, and rural development.
