= Autogestion =

Autogestion may refer to:

- Workers' self-management
- The construction of a self-managed economy
