= Parque Thays =

Park in Buenos Aires, Argentina

Coordinates: 34.5844°S 58.3878°W

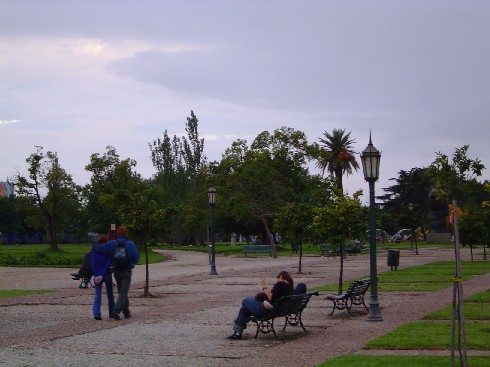

The Parque Thays is a public space in Recoleta, Buenos Aires, Argentina. The park is located in the corners of Libertador avenue y Callao avenue.

It was named after the French landscape architect Carlos Thays.

One of the sculptures can be seen in this place is Torso Masculino Desnudo ("Nude Male Torso") by Colombian artist Fernando Botero.

The land on which the park is located is the formerly occupied Italpark amusement park, which was closed in 1990.
