= Poder Popular =

Poder Popular ('People Power') may refer to:

- Poder popular (Chile), a slogan calling for a form of workers or direct democracy
- People's Power (Colombia), a political movement founded in 1981
