= Villa 31 =

Slum in Buenos Aires, Argentina

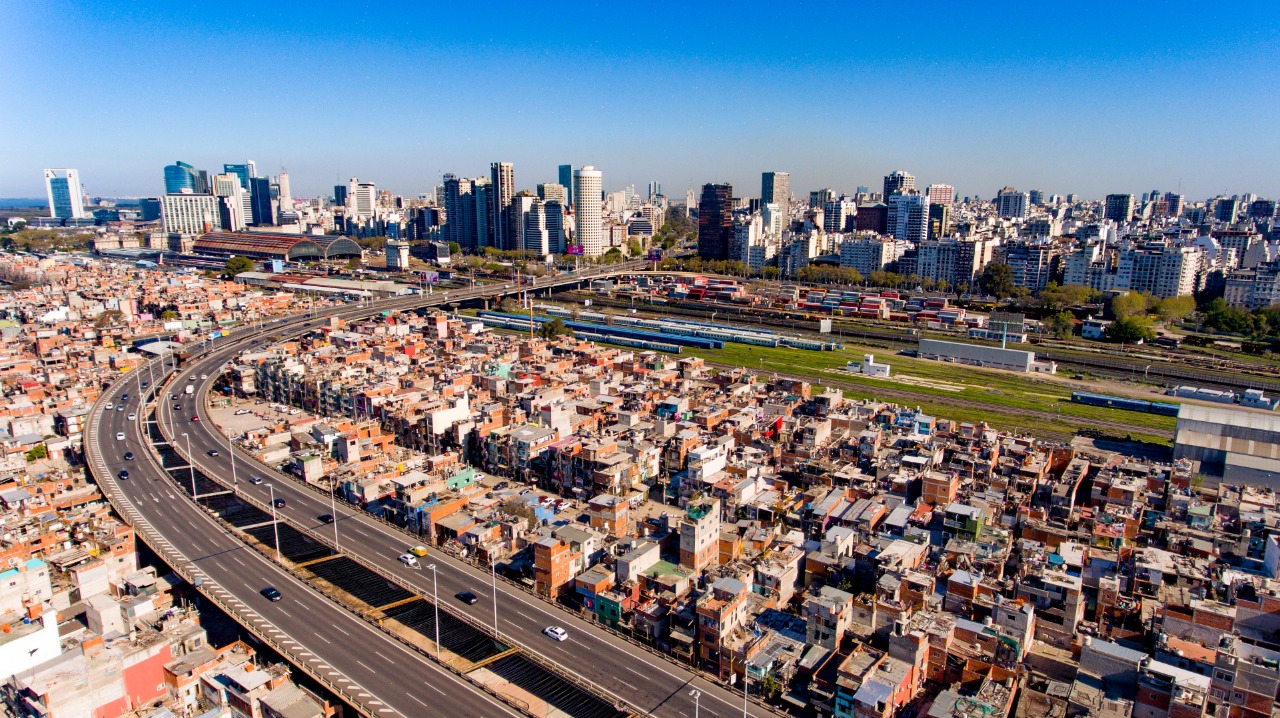
Villa 31 in contrast to the wealthy area of Buenos Aires and Illia Highway

Villa 31, sometimes called Barrio Padre Mugica or Barrio 31, is a large villa miseria (slum) in the Retiro area of Buenos Aires, near the local railway station. Its population is about 40,000 inhabitants, It was originally populated by Italian and Polish immigrants. Later, there was a large influx of immigrants from other northern provinces of Argentina. In the present most of the immigrants are from Paraguay or Bolivia. Most are under the age of 40 years old.

The first record of the slum is from 1932, when some immigrants and workers started to occupy the zone due to its proximity to the Port of Buenos Aires after the effects of the Great Depression in Argentina. The slum was a refuge for lower class people, who came from the rest of Argentina, especially the northern parts of the country. The slum also drew immigrants from neighboring countries. This has become a key characteristic of the slum.

The slum is a symbol of inequality of the country because it is near the most exclusive zones of Buenos Aires, like Recoleta and the most valued sector of Retiro. Successive governments tried to evict the zone without results for decades, sometimes resulting in the growth of the area. The opposition to the eviction of Villa 31 was represented by some left-wing organizations and groups of inhabitants. After a long discussion and debates, the Government of Buenos Aires recognized the legality and ownership of the inhabitants of the slum.

The city council planned to renovate the area by 2020, by improving housing, offering the opportunity for people to become homeowners and connecting electricity, water and sewage facilities. The $320 million plan, financed by the World Bank and the Inter-American Development Bank, aimed to resettle squatters into 1,350 new homes. At least 30% of the residents were concerned that they would not be rehoused.

== History ==
Previously, the zone was a big area without modern infrastructure near the railway station. Due to its proximity to the port, the Government —as owner of the place— decided to not occupy Villa 31 in order to make some projects like the construction of Government buildings, universities and facilities for the port area. Argentina was a popular destination for many poor European immigrants and then the Government authorized as a provisional measure to use the zone as a temporary place for European immigrants (like Italian, Polish, among others). The first modernization of the zone occurred when they built zinc and cardboard houses. Even with the modernization efforts, some people still live in unused train wagons and buildings near the railway.

Despite the fact they were evicted many times, the sector never ceased to be a zone of poor houses, always defying the authorities and growing like a little city inside Buenos Aires. In those times, they used different names like "Villa Desocupación" ("Idleness Villa") or "Villa Esperanza" ("Hope Villa"). The growth of the slum was always related to succession of the crisis of the Argentinian economy and the military trying to eradicate the slum. The villa was a place of action for the Movement of Priests for the Third World, making famous the priest Carlos Mugica, who was an activist against the eradication of the slum. Mugica was killed and after that some people started to call the slum "Barrio Padre Mugica". The villa has a church "Cristo Obrero" (Christ the Worker) created by Mugica and his group of priests which was used to give mass for then Jorge Mario Bergoglio to show support of the activities of the priests of the villas.

The slum was a common discussion in Argentina about the right to housing. Mayor Horacio Rodríguez Larreta recognized the legality of the slum and started a process of integration of the slum. The Government of Buenos Aires with Larreta as mayor announced that the Buenos Aires Underground will have stations in the slum. Some critics claim that Larreta wants to make slum tourism or gentrification. After this project, McDonald's even open a restaurant employing inhabitants of the villa.

== Popular culture ==
This slum, as many others, was an inspiration for the Argentinian TV telenovela La 1-5/18 and subject of many books like La Villa of César Aira.

The slum hosted some sports and training facilities during the 2018 Summer Youth Olympics in Buenos Aires.
