= Italpark =

- Italpark Logo.
- Interactive map of Italpark
- Location: Buenos Aires, Argentina
- Coordinates: 34°35′8″S 58°23′10″W
- Opened: 1960
- Closed: 1990
- Owner: Zanon family

View of the Italpark entrance, ticket office and marquee.

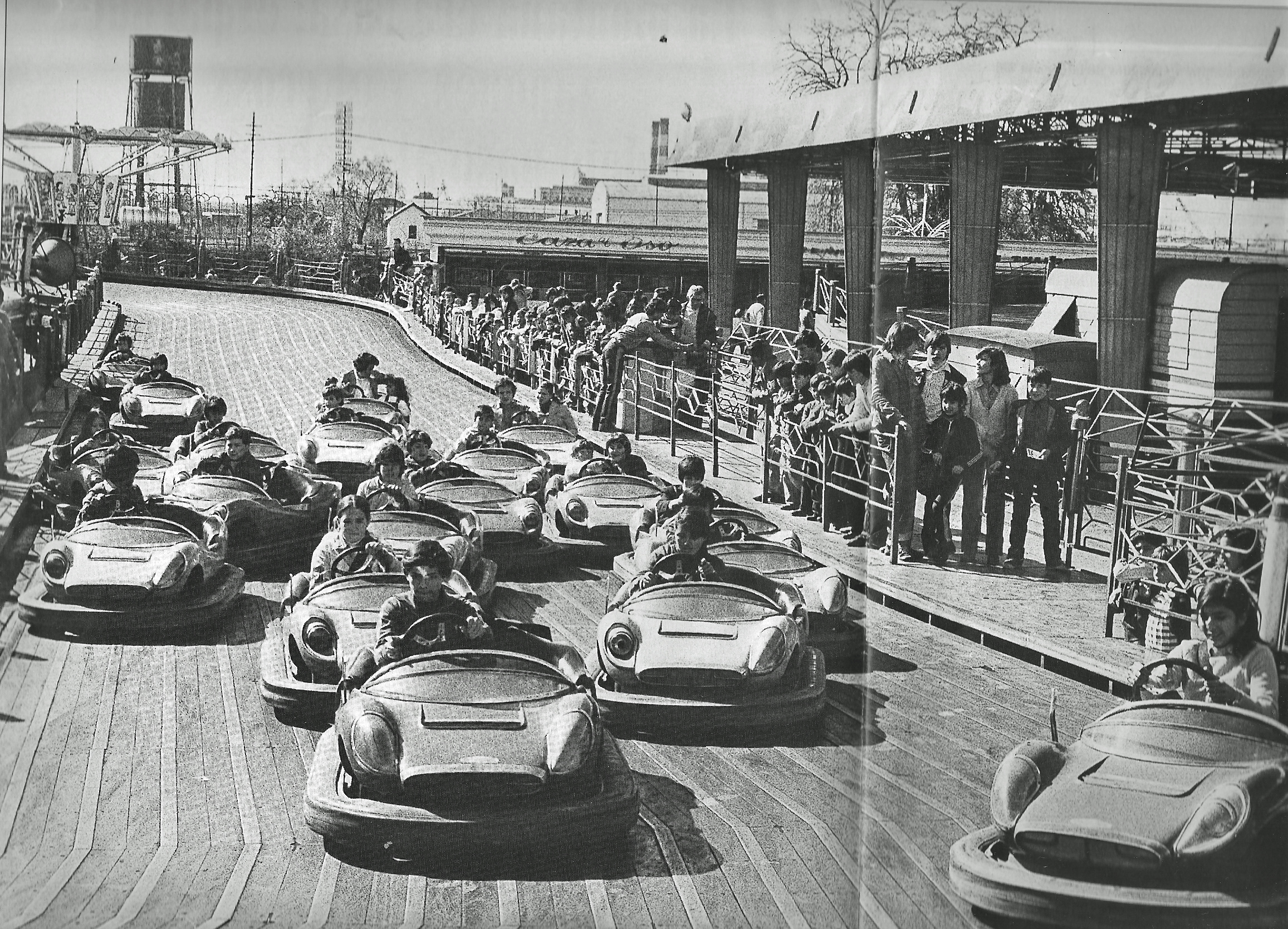
Italpark attraction, year 1979.

The Italpark was a theme park in Argentina, which was located at where currently is the Parque Thays (at del Libertador and Callao), in the Recoleta neighbourhood of Buenos Aires. It became a landmark of Buenos Aires in its 30 years of existence up until its closure in 1990.

== History ==
Italpark was opened in 1960 to accommodate the festivities of the 150th anniversary of the May Revolution.

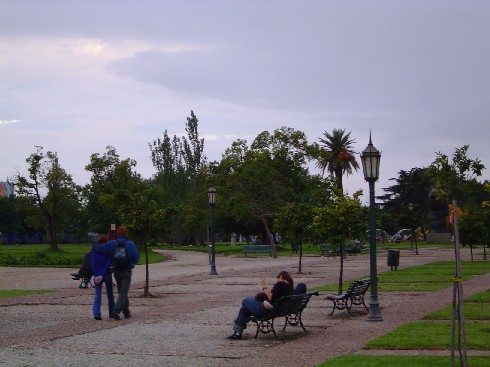
View of Parque Thays, where the Italpark used to be

== Crisis and demise ==
On 29 July 1990, one of the wagons of the Matter Horn ride broke, killing 15-year-old Roxana Celia Alaimo, and severely wounding her friend Karina Benítez.

Four months later, the city mayor Carlos Grosso ordered the definitive closure of Italpark as consequence of the tragedy.

== See also ==
- Parque de la Ciudad
- Parque Thays
- Shopping Sur
- Parque de la Costa
