= Cordón industrial =

Cordón Industrial (or in plural Cordones industriales; English: Industrial Belts) is an organ of popular power or of workplace democracy. Cordones were established in Chile by the working class during the Salvador Allende Popular Unity government (1970–1973).

== Historical context ==
The cordones were established by the independent activity of working class people and were initially established to pressure the government to socialize a number of companies that refused to accept workers rights. Their formation were extended and their creation-pace accelerated in response to sabotage and strikes organized by employers' organizations and the Bourgeoisie that aimed to destabilize the Salvador Allende democratically elected socialist government and derail the implementation of a socialist programme. Initially created as organs to exert social pressure on the ruling government, they ultimately became a base for working-class political power itself. The first cordón was established on June 19, 1972, when workers from 30 different factories join to formulate the Cordon Cerrillos.

== Structure ==
Each Cordón was a group of factories and companies, which coordinated the tasks of workers in the same zone. By the time the Salvador Allende government was overthrown on September 11, 1973 military coup 31 cordones had been established and were operational. Of the 31 cordones 8 of them were within the Chilean capital of Santiago.

== Cordones and the State ==
The independent nature of these organs of poder popular from the bureaucracies of the official trade union body (C.U.T.), the state (the National Congress of Chile) and the leadership of the parties forming the governing Popular Unity coalition (viz. Socialist Party, Communist Party, etc.) created a complex situations for those attempting to implement socialism within the framework of existing democratic institutions. Some political organisations such as the Revolutionary Left Movement (which was not part of the popular unity coalition) and the Popular Unitary Action Movement saw these organs of popular power as embryonic social organs for a new more democratic form of workers' state.

== See also ==
- Poder Popular (Chile)
- Inclusive Democracy
- Workers' councils
- Participatory democracy
- Workers' control
- Workplace democracy
