= Avenida Callao =

Street in Buenos Aires, Argentina

Coordinates: 34°36′04″S 58°23′34″W

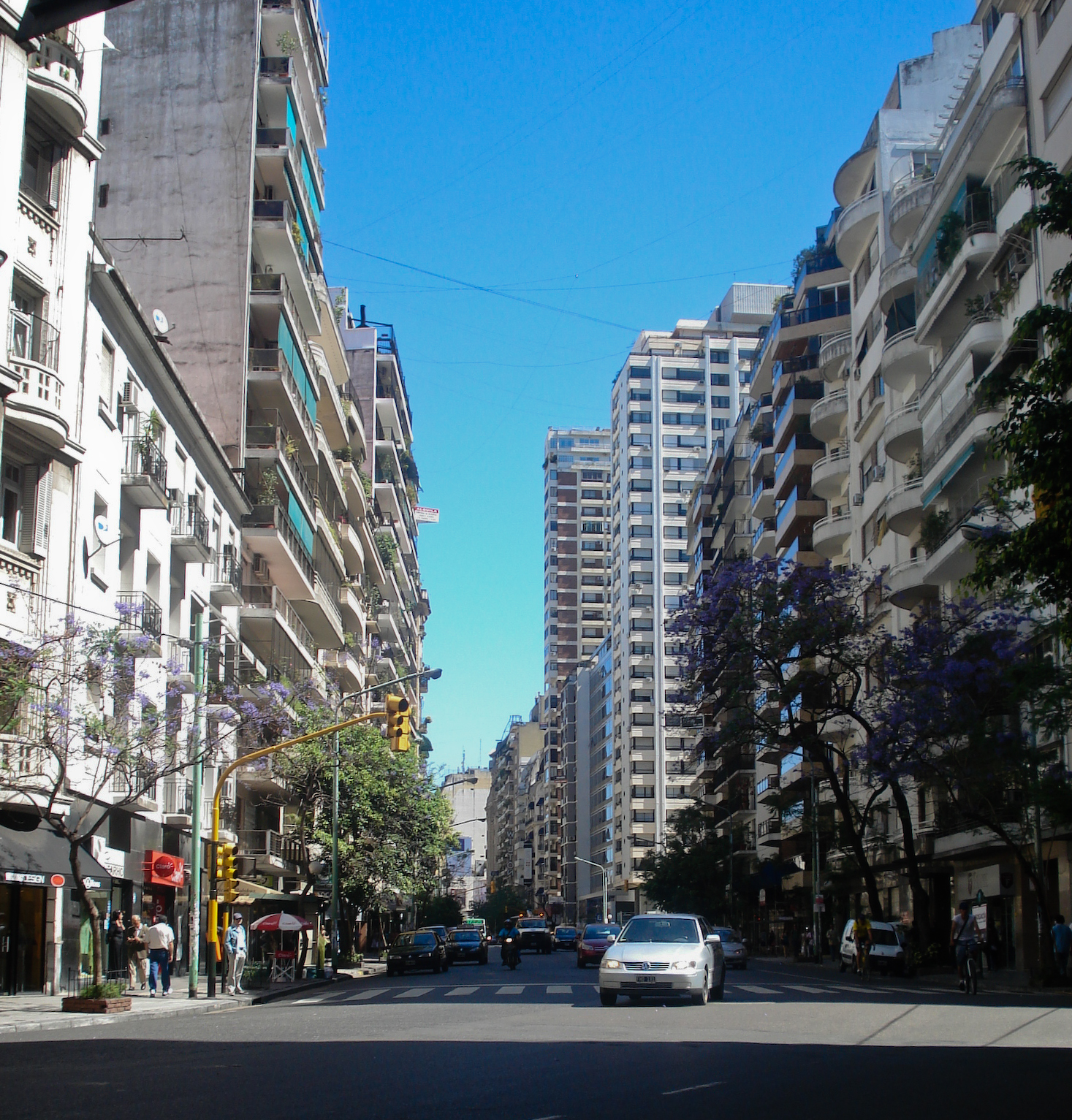
View of Avenida Callao from the north.

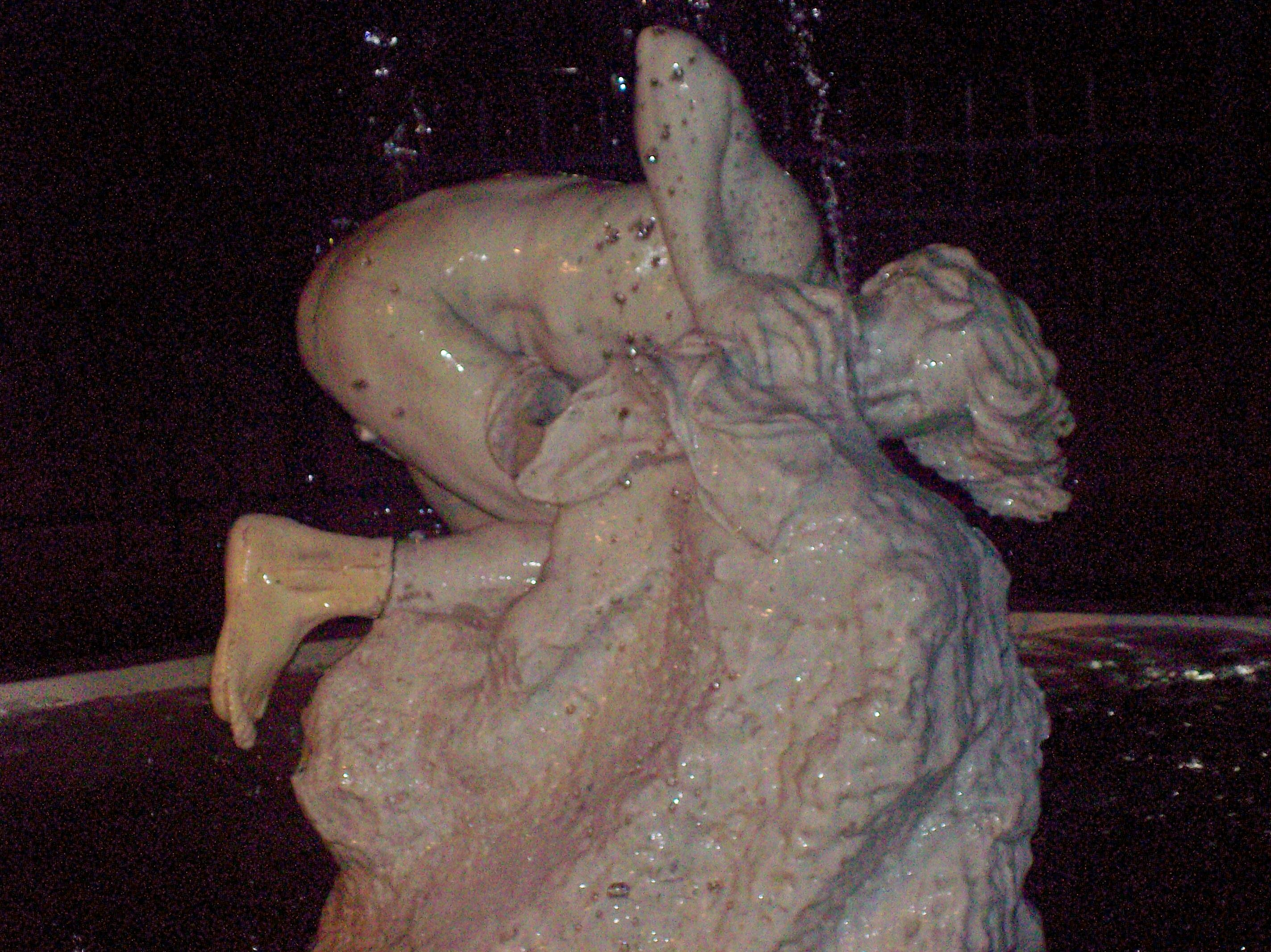
Luisa Isella de Motteau's Thirst (1914).

Callao Avenue (Spanish: Avenida Callao) is one of the principal thoroughfares in Buenos Aires, Argentina.

== Overview ==
Mayor Torcuato de Alvear, inspired by the urban redevelopment works in Paris at the direction of Baron Haussmann, drew up master plans for major boulevards, running east to west (every six blocks) and north to south (every ten blocks). Named in honor of the decisive Battle of Callao, the avenue was included in the plan and widened in the 1880s. A one-way thoroughfare following a 1967 ordinance, the avenue travels northwards from its outset at Rivadavia Avenue, along the northwest corner of Congressional Plaza. That intersection is known for both the Argentine Congress and the El Molino Café, both of whose domes are Buenos Aires landmarks. At the corner of Callao and Bartolemo Mitre is Residencia Azul, a student residence for college students and foreign travelers.

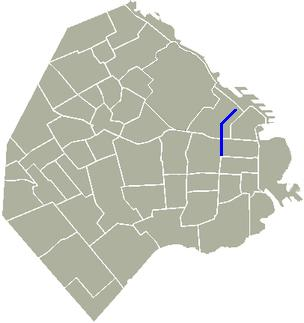
Location of Avenida Callao in Buenos Aires.

Three blocks north, the avenue passes by the Bauen Hotel, a modernist highrise that garnered international attention following an employee takeover in the aftermath of its 2001 closure. The hotel, which maintains its 1970s interiors, is today one of Argentina's most successful "recovered workplaces." Two blocks on, Callao is graced by the Church of the Savior, a Jesuit temple designed by local architect Pedro Luzetti between 1872 and 1887; their College of the Savior is adjacent to the church. At Córdoba Avenue, where the avenue enters the upscale Recoleta borough, the Clásica y Moderna bookstore has been one of the avenue's best-known cultural landmarks since 1938, when it became the first in Buenos Aires to incorporate a café. A block on, Rodríguez Peña Plaza provides needed parkland space along one of the city's most-densely populated areas. The plaza is notable for the Pizzurno Palace facing it (the Ministry of Education) and Luisa Isella de Motteau's Thirst, her realist sculpture completed in 1914. A distinctly rounded Art Deco apartment building designed by Francisco Salamone stands on the southwest corner of the avenue and Pacheco de Melo Street.

Callao Avenue ends at Avenida del Libertador, one of the city's most important boulevards. An amusement park, Italpark, stood at this site between 1960 and 1990, after which the lot was converted to Thays Park (named in honor of French Argentine urbanist Charles Thays). The twenty-block avenue is not only a commuter artery, it also features a concentration of Belle Époque architecture, much of which has been lost to development since the 1950s. The City Legislature is considering assigning a Historical Protection designation on the avenue, a measure protecting 85 significant buildings along Callao.

Avenida Callao
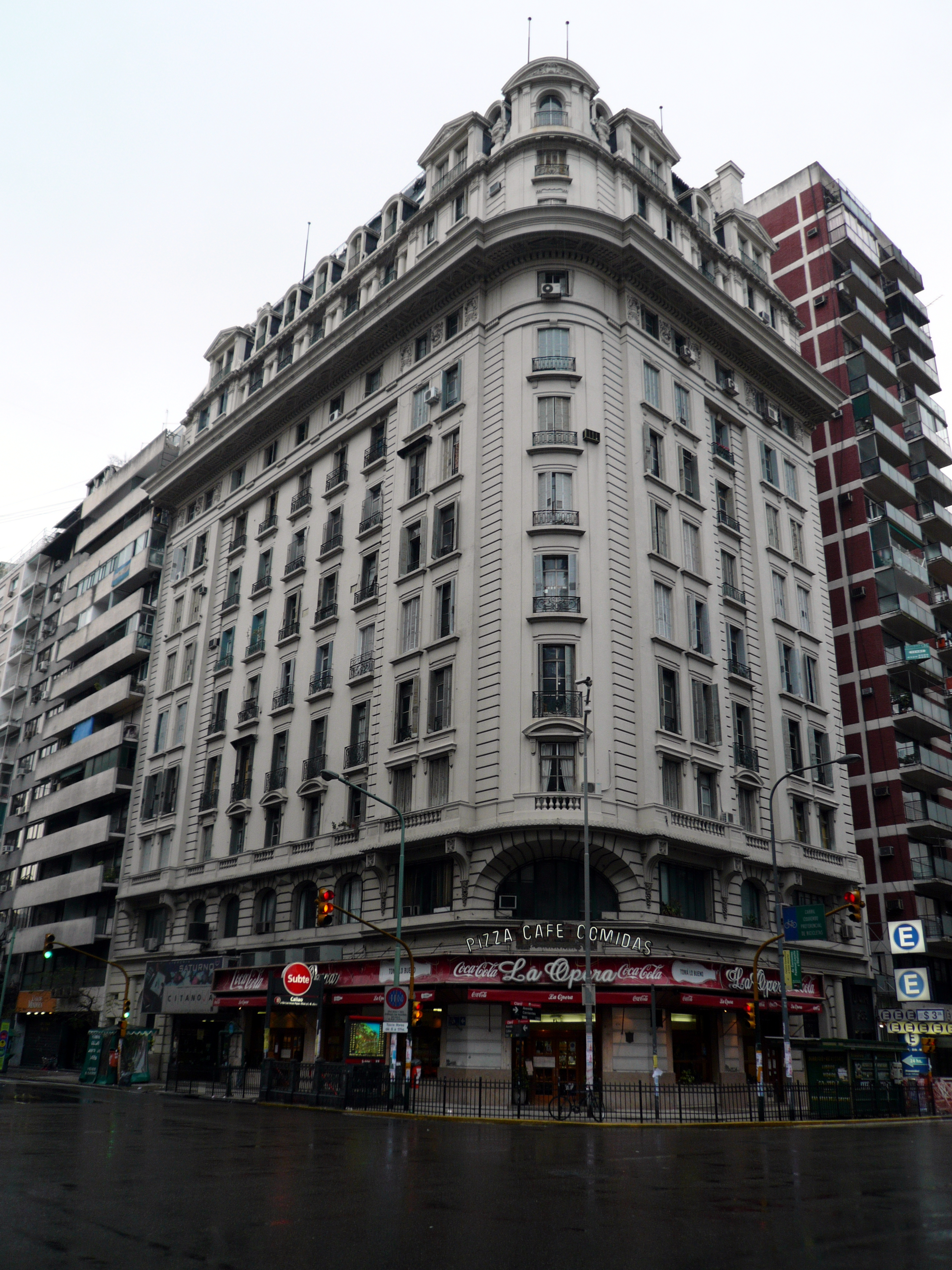
At Avenida Corrientes

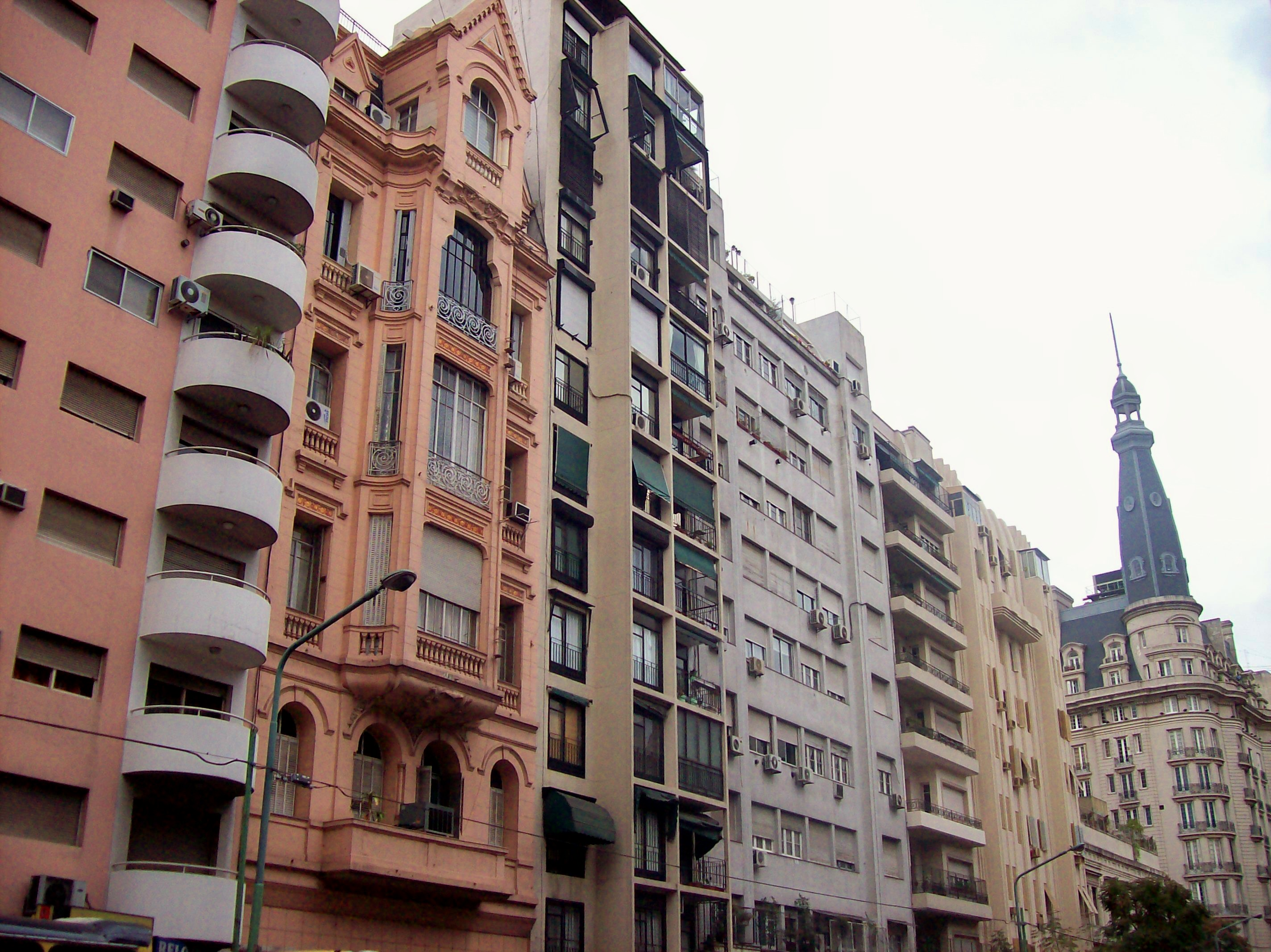
Along the avenue's San Nicolás side

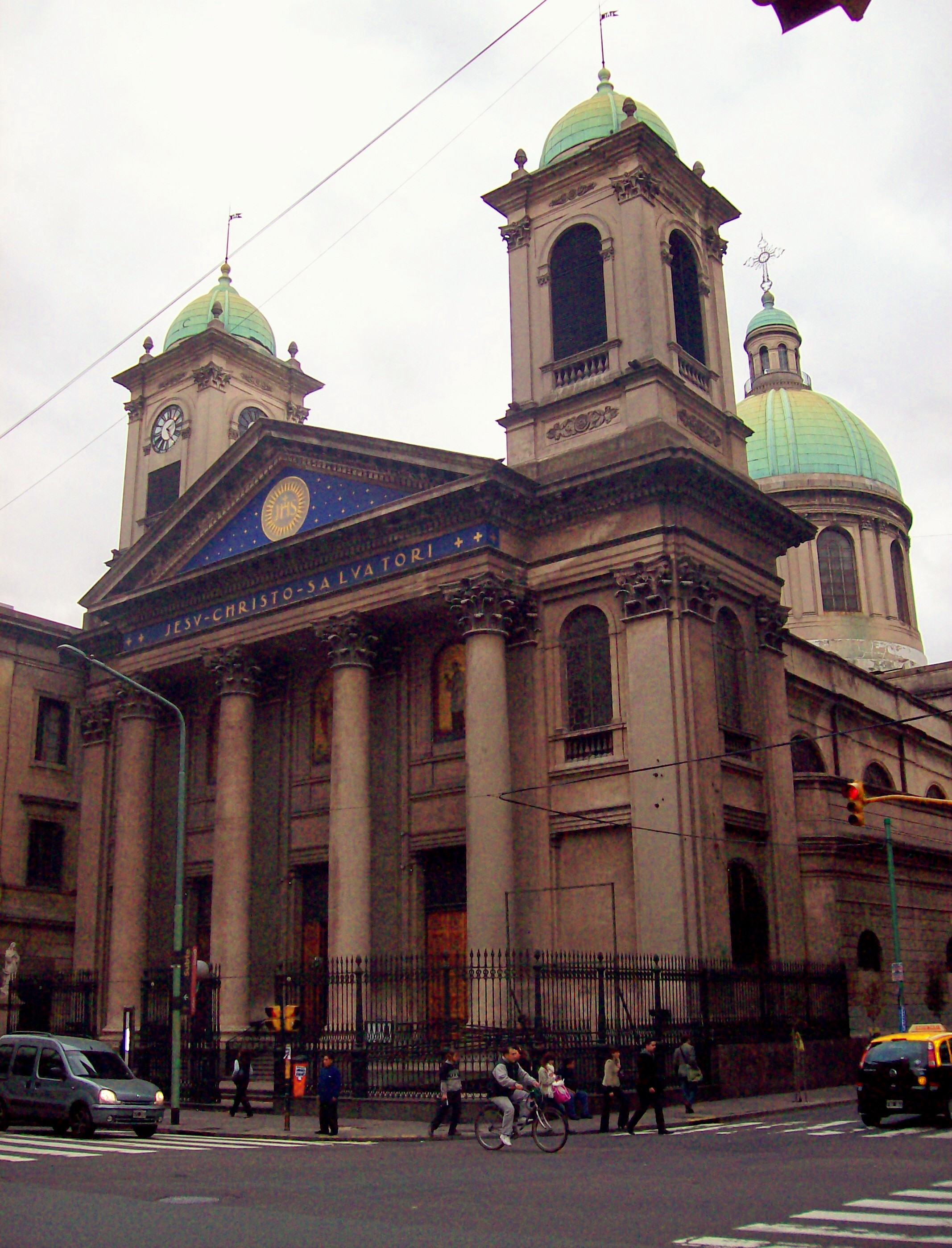
The Church of the Savior

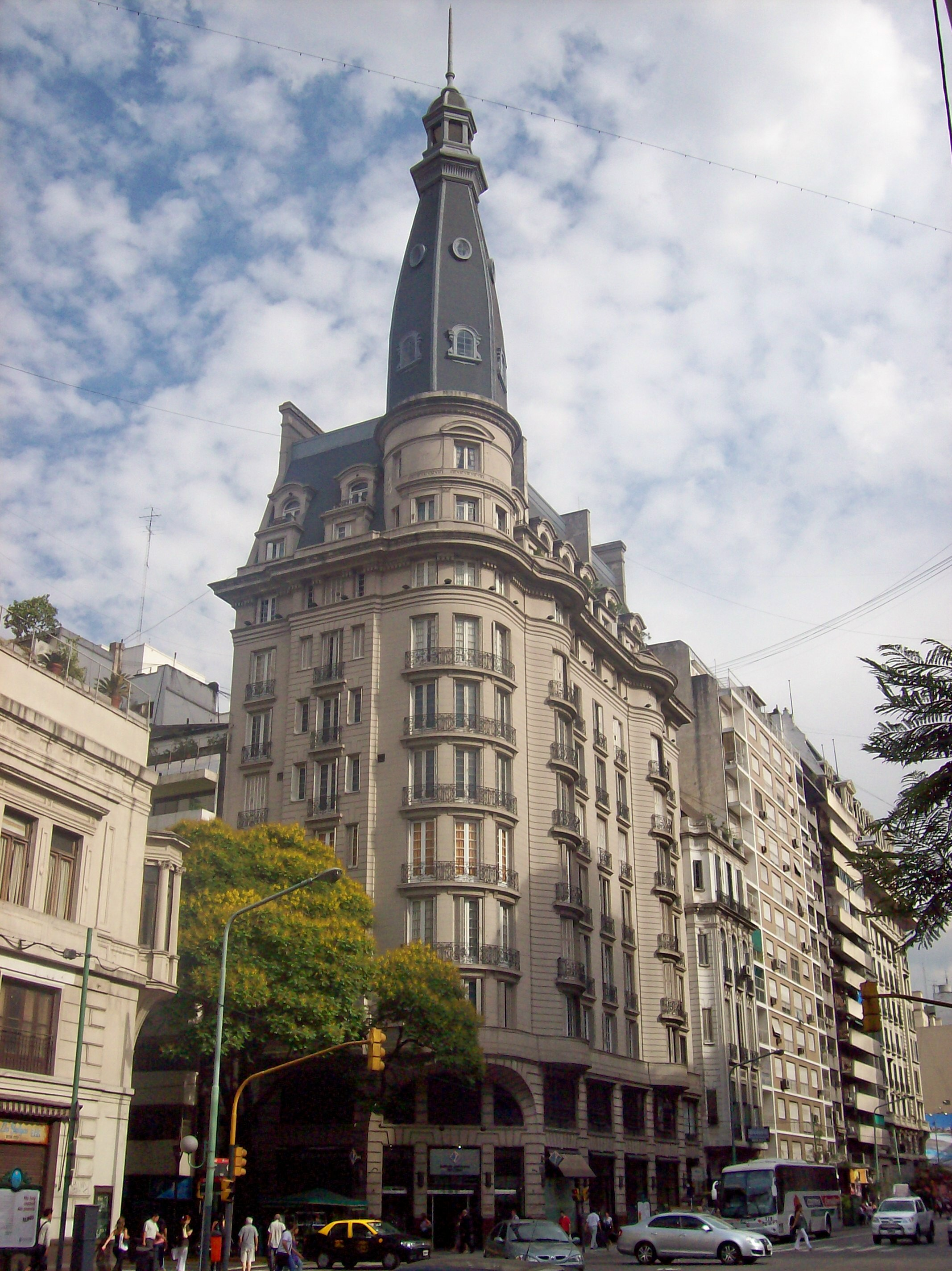
At Lavalle street

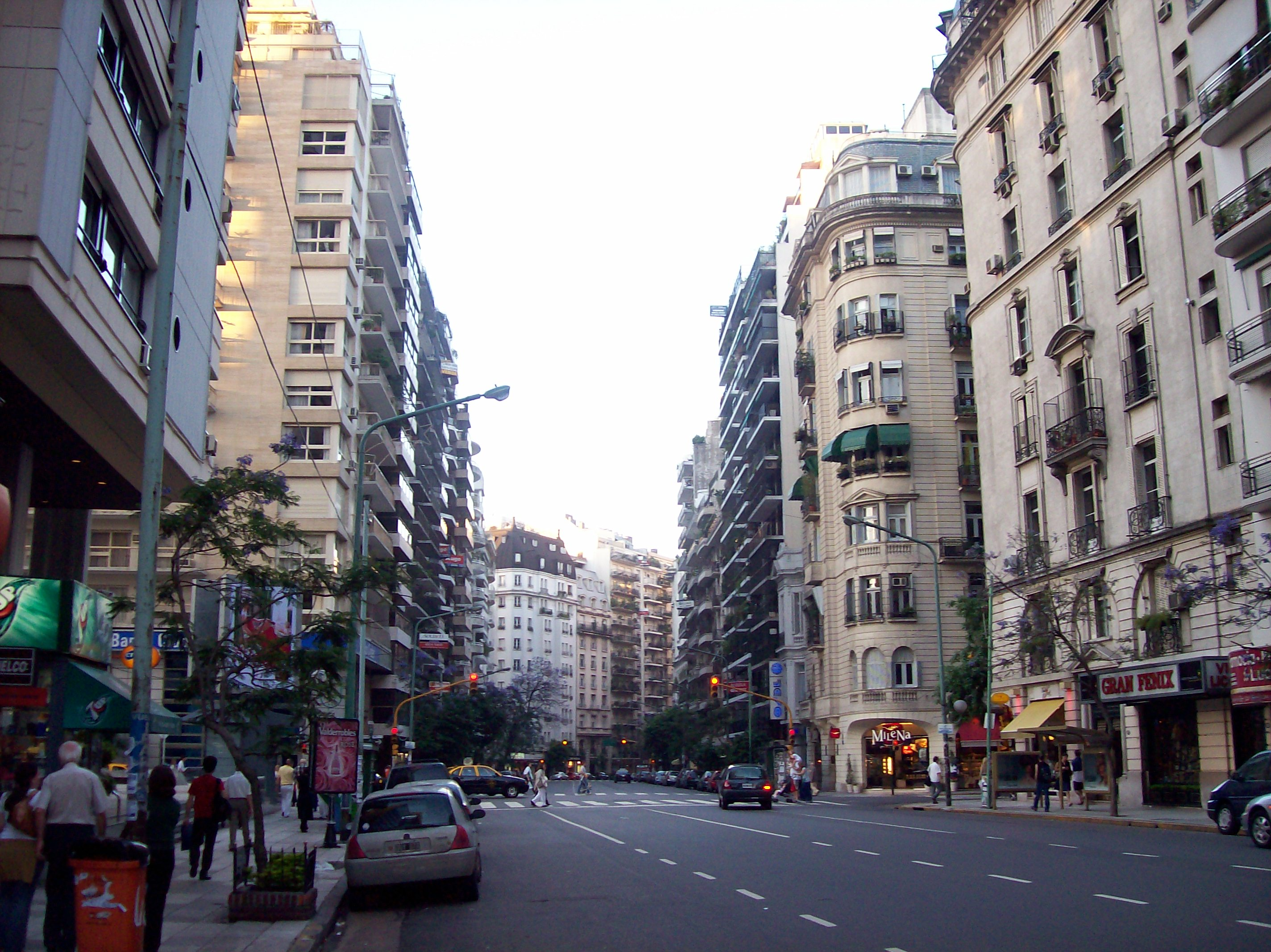
Along its Recoleta stretch

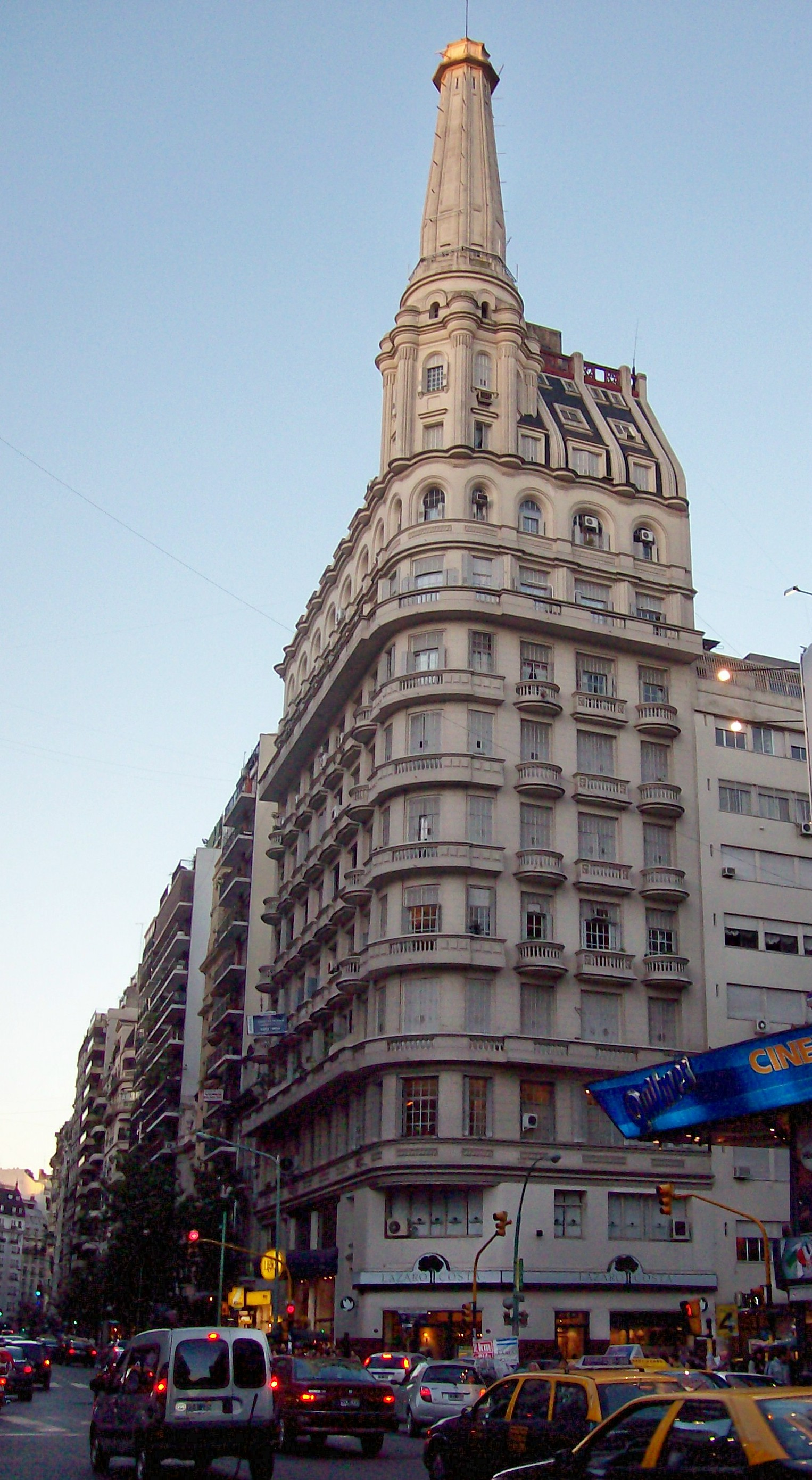
At Santa Fe Avenue

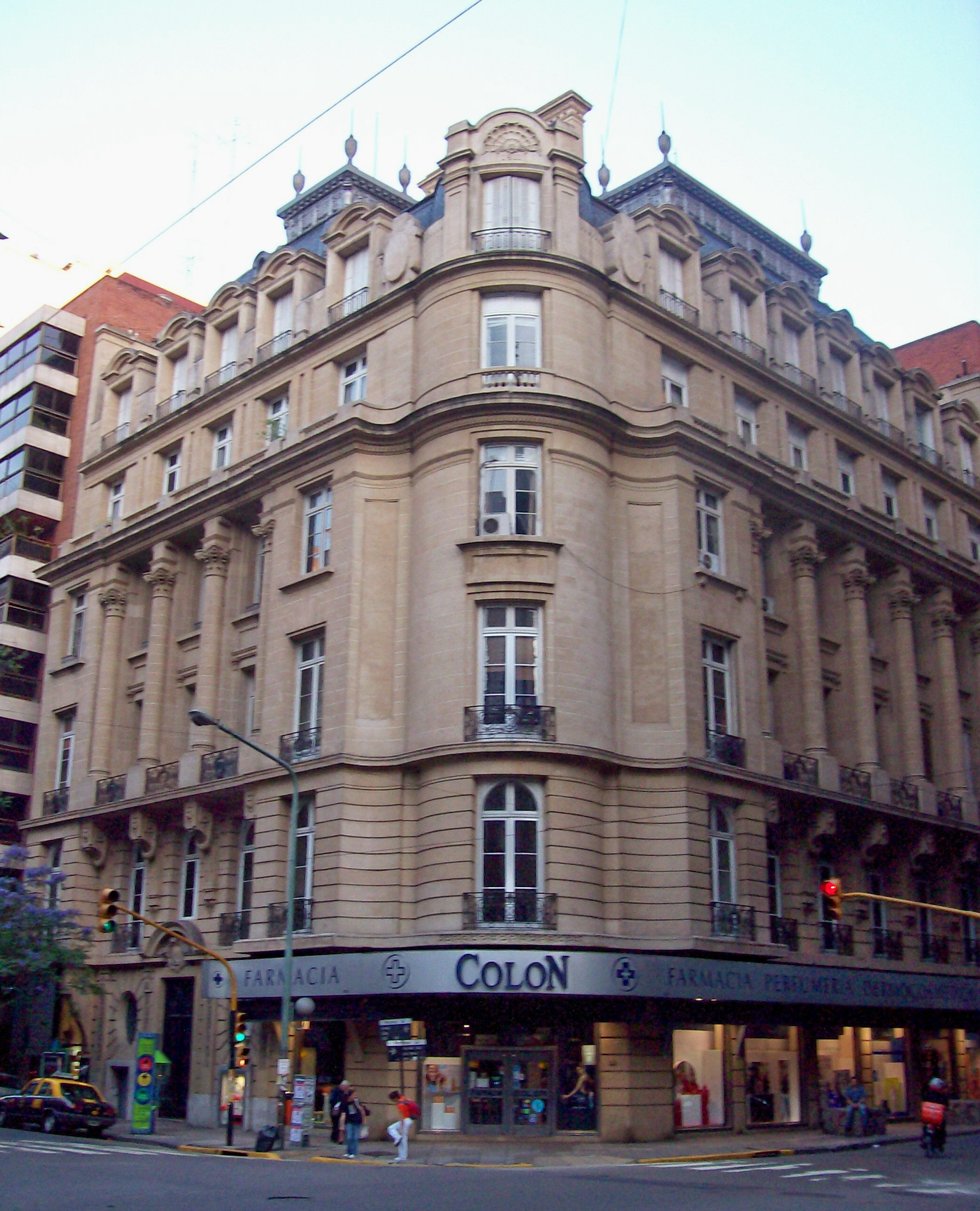
At Las Heras Avenue

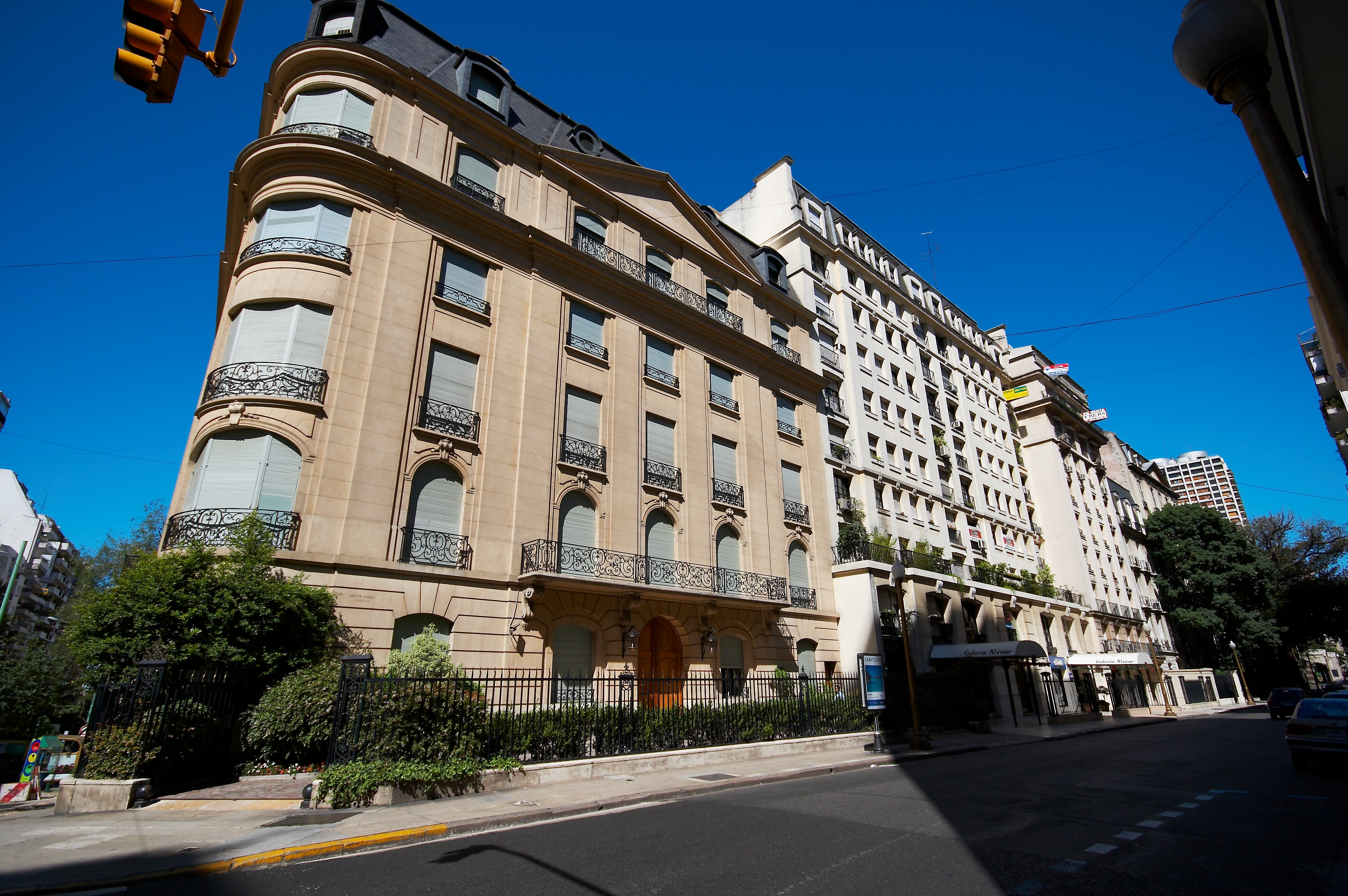
At Alvear Avenue
