= Villa miseria =

Type of shanty town slum in Argentina

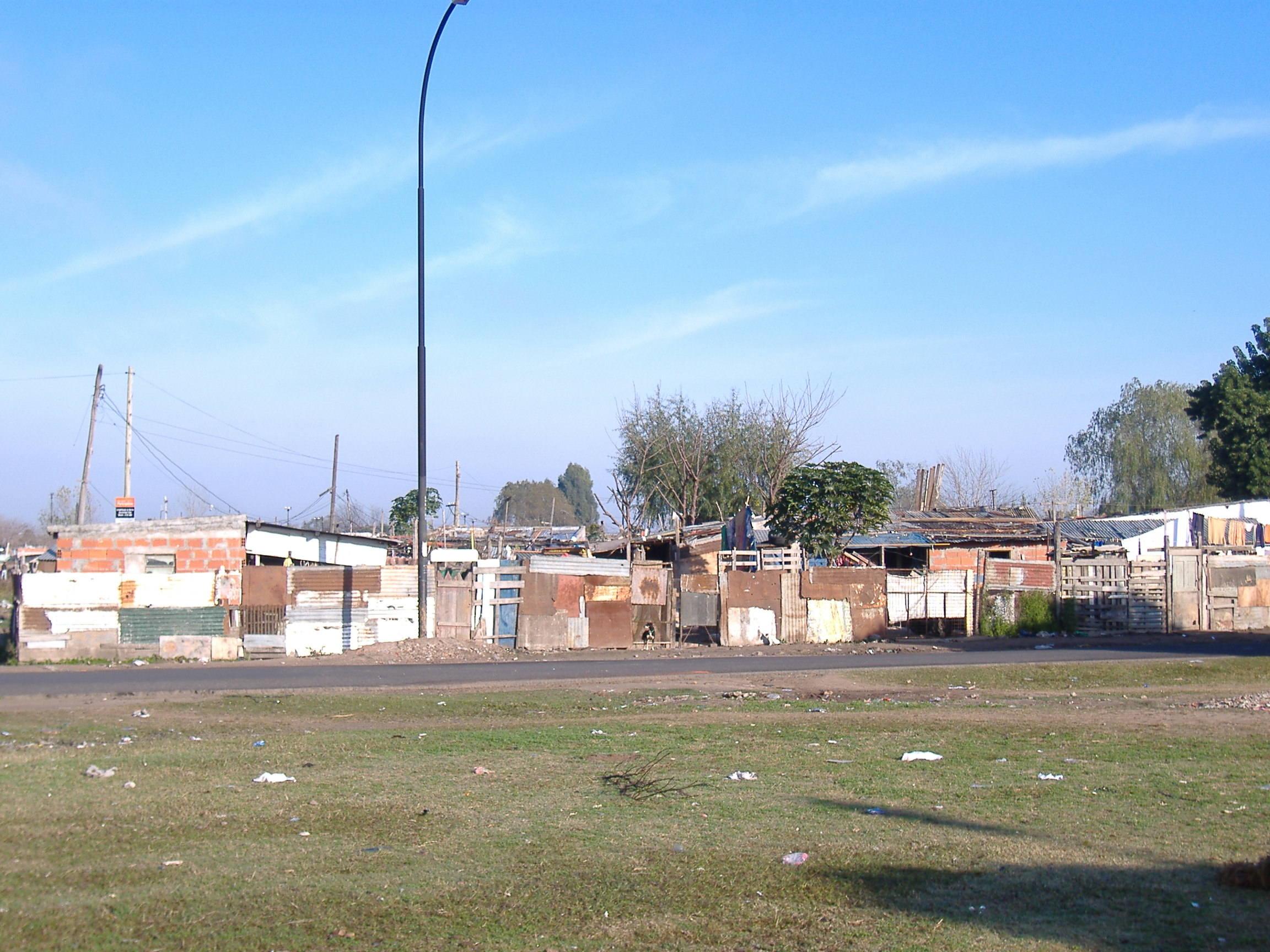
Houses in a villa miseria in Rosario, Santa Fe

Villa miseria (Spanish pronunciation: [ˈbiʝa miˈseɾja]; locally [ˈbiʃa miˈseɾja]), villa de emergencia or simply villa, is the informal term used in Argentina for shanty town slums.

== Name ==
The term is a noun phrase made up of the Spanish words villa (village, small town) and miseria (misery, destitution). The concept was first articulated in an October 1933 article titled "La VILLA de la MISERIA dentro de la CIUDAD MARAVILLOSA" (the villa of misery in the marvellous city) by Carlos Sibellino, and picked up in the title of Bernardo Verbitsky's 1957 novel Villa Miseria también es América ("Villa Miseria is also [a part of] America"). Other terms used are asentamiento ("settlement") and villa de emergencia ("emergency village"), the latter being the original name. These names are not popular with residents; shanty towns have come to be called, euphemistically, barrios populares ("popular neighbourhoods"). In most parts of Argentina, the non-modified word villa usually refers to a villa miseria.

== Informal settlements ==
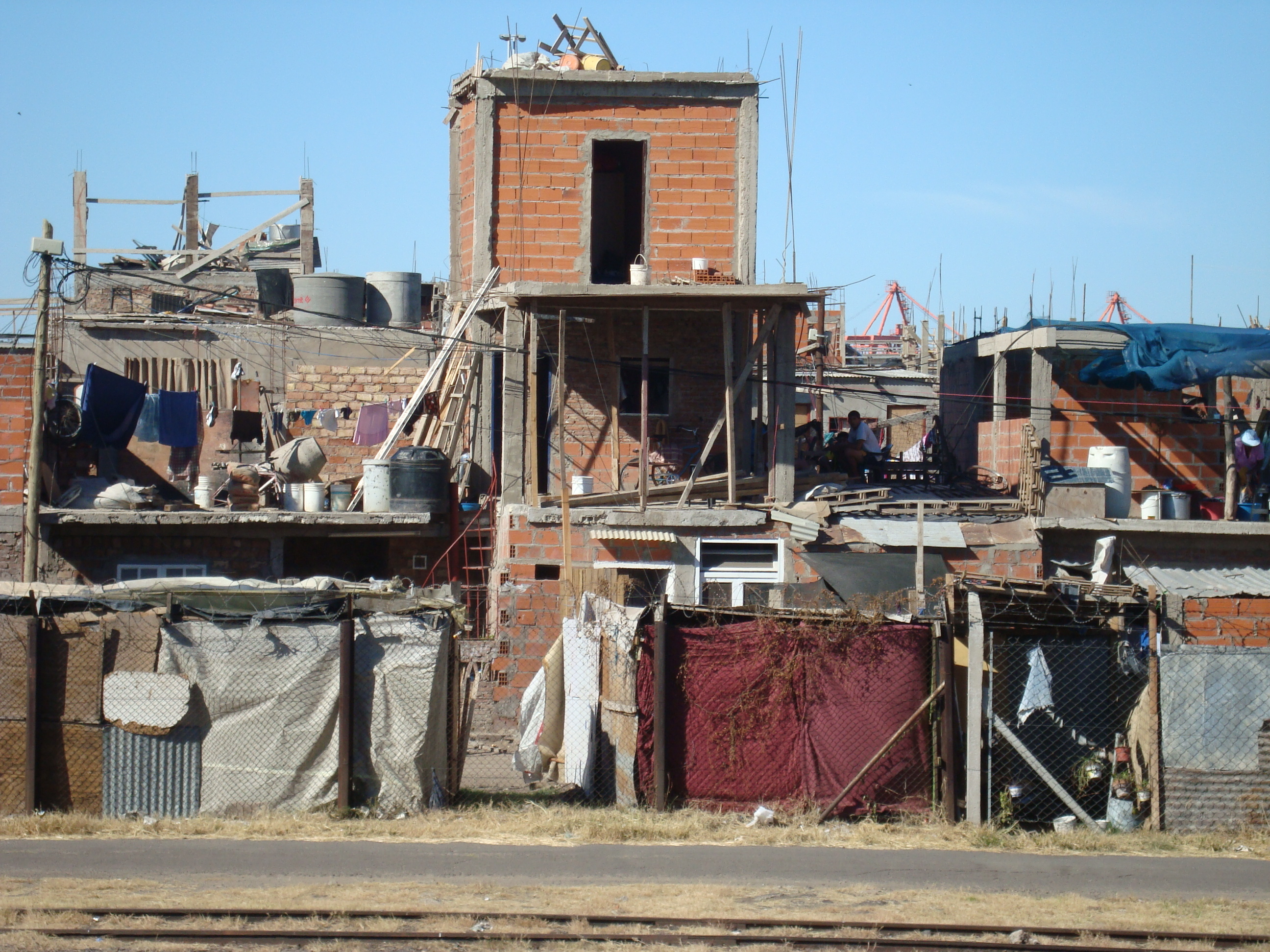
Shacks in Villa 31, near Retiro Station, Buenos Aires.

These settlements consist of small improvised houses or shacks made by their residents of corrugated iron, wood and other scrap material. The alleys are not usually paved, and narrow internal passages connect the different parts. The villas miseria have no sewerage. There may be water pipes passing through the settlement. Electric power is sometimes taken directly from the grid using illegal connections.

The villas range from small groups of precarious houses to larger, more organized communities with thousands of residents. In rural areas the shacks might be made of mud and wood. There are villas miseria around and within most Argentine cities. They draw people from several backgrounds, often local people who have fallen from an already precarious economic position. In most cases, a villa miseria is populated by the children and grandchildren of the original settlers, who have been unable to improve their situation.

== Statistics ==
By 2011, there were over 500,000 people living in more than 800 informal settlements around the periphery of Buenos Aires. A non-governmental organization known as TECHO, also known as Un Techo para mi País, found that of these settlements, 66% had been founded in the last fifteen years and 65% were still growing. Most villas (85%) had no sewerage, and a similar percentage had no access to gas.

The National Institute of Statistics and Censuses of Argentina announced in 2016 that 8.8 million people, 32.2% of the population, were living in poverty. This was a dramatic leap in numbers from the 4.7% people living in poverty just three years before.

The TECHO organisation estimated that there were more than 1,000 informal settlements in Greater Buenos Aires in 2015, only 10% of which had access to running water and 5% to sewage infrastructure.

== Programs ==
Attempting to address the housing problem, the de facto president of Argentina Alejandro Lanusse established the Fondo Nacional de la Vivienda (FONAVI) in 1972. An amalgam of long-standing national housing programs and lending facilities previously managed by the Banco Hipotecario, FONAVI helped coordinate slum clearance efforts and, since then, has put up over 25,000 housing units a year (both single-family and multi-family types).

The military junta which ruled Argentina between 1974 and 1983 in the Dirty War attempted to destroy the informal slums by forcibly resettling people, which only succeeded in moving the villas miseria to new locations.

Horacio Rodríguez Larreta, the chief of government of the city of Buenos Aires, said that he intended to regularize all the informal settlements by 2023.

== See also ==
- Squatting in Argentina
- Favela (Brazil)
- Pueblos jóvenes (Peru)
