= Poder popular (Chile) =

Poder popular (English popular or people power) is a slogan calling for a form of workers or direct democracy. In Chilean history poder popular has referred to a form of political power that is derived from the independent activity of working class people, which is (in theory) in its formulation and constitution, highly collective, flexible, representative and direct. This is alleged to be fundamentally different from bourgeois parliamentary democratic power, which is achieved via a democratic electoral process but once established is imposed upon a predominantly static and apolitical electorate via highly inflexible bureaucratic social institutions.

Throughout the 20th century, many forms of organs of poder popular were established in Chile. The most developed and important ones were formed during the Popular Unity government headed by Salvador Allende (1970-1973), especially the cordones industriales which at one stage incorporated and coordinated a considerable section of the labor force in the country and threatened the traditional ground occupied by the official workers federation CUT and the leadership of the traditional working class political organizations. Poder popular was also used as the name of a proposal for revolutionary political organization by the Revolutionary Left Movement.
