= Participatory management =

Empowering group members in organizational decision making

In social science and governance, participatory management is the practice of empowering members of a group, such as employees of a company, or citizens of a community, to participate in organizational decision making. It is used as an alternative to traditional vertical management structures, which has shown to be less effective as participants are growing less interested in their leader's expectations due to a lack of recognition of the participant's effort or opinion.

This practice grew out of the human relations movement in the 1920s, and is based on some of the principles discovered by scholars doing research in management and organization studies, most notably the Hawthorne Experiments that led to the Hawthorne effect.

While group leaders still retain final decision-making authority when participatory management is practiced, participants are encouraged to voice their opinions about their current environment. In the workplace, this concept is sometimes considered industrial democracy.

In the 1990s, participatory management was revived in a different form through advocacy of organizational learning practices, particularly by clients and students of Peter Senge.

== About ==
=== Theories ===
The participatory management model or at least techniques for systematically sharing authority emphasize concerns with the delegation of decision making authority to employees. Participatory management has cut across many disciplines such as public administration, urban planning, and public policy making. In theory, the model does much more than recognize that employees ought to be able to recommend changes or course of action, but rather reflect a belief that authority should be transferred to and shared with employees. The belief in this theory stems from understanding what the culture of an organization or institution represents. Conceptually, organizational culture is thought to represent a symbolic and ideal system composed of values and norms implemented by its founders, then shared and reflected to influence behavior of its members or employees in the institution. The culture of the organization or institution is in turn used to guide the meaning of the organization's work.

There are certain institutions that successfully participate in organizational structures specific to hierarchical management models, thereby configuring power distribution, authority, communication and decision making. In an Organizational Structure, or Classical Management, employees do not participate in the decision-making process. Employees receive, interpret and carry out orders after the decisions are made by administrators. Participatory management is a shift in the management paradigm from a top-down approach to a more self-facilitated and self-sustained approach. Employees are given the freedom and responsibility, accompanied by all the necessary tools needed to delegate decision making, authority and evaluations of existing and foreseeable/unforeseeable problems. One tool in participatory management is implementing a Contingency Theory approach. This theoretical approach acknowledges that every problem is different, therefore every problem requires different approaches and solutions.Principles of participatory management consist of fundamental ideas that seek to empower and enhance the employee's understanding of problems as to explore and generate the greatest potential solutions embodying the ideals of democratic inclusion and participation.

=== Shifting to and implementation ===
Shifting the paradigm from classical management to participatory management requires a collaborative consensus as an organization or institution with communication, inclusion, transparency and development. Creating and sustaining an adaptive capacity for ongoing problem solving with an emphasis on social and transformative learning through trust, sustained engagement, and relationship development are important factors when contributing to the overall success or failure of participatory management. Fostering a comfortable environment for employees by creating transparency and building new relationships support broad participation in ongoing planning, implementation, and evaluations which sustains diverse participation in managing expectations and actions with a collective understanding of goals and outcomes.

When implementing this theory, the only thing for certain is uncertainty. Managing uncertainty must be conceptually addressed to reduce conflict. Conflict can stem from problems caused by misinterpretation, or lack of clarity when it comes to communication or questions concerning values, relationships, and goals.

Deliberative, collaborative, and consensus based approaches facilitate learning, as inputs across a wide range of members can provide a diverse range of opinions, and lowers the risk of sampling bias. This is called collaborative science, or collaborative method of consensus. Incorporating this approach to participatory management facilitates shared learning and makes the institution and team development stronger, through the contribution of individuals. Communicating values, creating a safe and comfortable environment along with a genuine and concerted effort should be at the foundation of an organization or institution aiming to implement participatory management as a successful tool.

== Effects ==
=== Productivity ===
Participatory management may lead to increased productivity, motivation, job satisfaction and quality enhancement, however, it may also slow down the process of decision making and act as a potential security threat by providing access to valuable information to fellow employees. This section will discuss the effects Participatory Management had at the NATURA 2000 forest sites in Greece and the pros and cons participatory management has on productivity in the workplace.

In a study concerning the effectiveness of a participatory management framework in Protected Areas (PAs) in which are located in areas with strong state-based environmental management, the study states, "From an environmental perspective, there is evidence that involvement of a community in the management of a PA can result to a more effective management of biodiversity" (e.g. Blomley et al., 2008). This is mainly because participatory management frameworks promote sustainable management practices (Berkes et al., 2003). From a socio-economic perspective, a major benefit is the increase of social acceptability levels for specific protection frameworks (Stoll-Kleemann and Welp, 2008). Furthermore, the application of 'softer' and participatory management tools may assist in local economic development through, for example, eco-tourism activities and minimization of social conflicts (Misra and Kant, 2004, Chowdhury and Koike, 2010, Nuggehalli and Prokopy, 2009, Nayak and Berkes, 2008, Sandstrom and Widmark, 2007, Matose, 2006 and Jones et al., 2012a). In addition, participatory management allows the use of local values and knowledge for the management of a specific area of high biodiversity value in combination with scientific information (Berkes, 2004)."

In summary, the study states, participatory management may result in a more effective management framework. Participatory Management may contribute to a more productive environment by:

- Promoting sustainable management practices.
- Increasing social acceptability levels.
- Minimizing social conflicts, for example: eliminating competition.
- Allowing the use of local values and knowledge to be utilized during management.
- Greater job satisfaction which in turn increases productivity
- Reduced costs through increased efficiency and a lesser need for supervision and delegation.
- Participatory Management can lead to the empowerment of employees which in turn could lead to employees taking more risks. These risks can be successful or harmful to the project's productivity level.

Harms participatory management can have on productivity levels:

- Creativity and innovation may lead to harmful risks which can then render the project's productivity level to fail.
- Participatory management may lead to individual empowerment; which in turn can lead to egotism / arrogance. Egotism / arrogance can result in problems for the supervisors and managers; they can have problems delegating their employees, thus resulting in poor productivity.
- Individual empowerment may lead to decreased productivity on account of different opinions and cultures clashing.

=== Perceptions ===
Participatory management can have negative and positive effects on individuals in the workplace. In order for participatory management to have a positive effect, there must be "trust in institutions, social trust and social networks". "Trust in institutions influences communities' perceptions". When there is a high level of trust among a community, "citizens tend to be more positive towards collaborative management frameworks". Social networks are important for the flow of information because it influences the level of participation in management frameworks, the level of awareness in a community and also environmentally responsible behaviors.

Employee perceptions in the workplace may create an atmosphere in which an individual feels the freedom to use their creativity and unique skills. Workers may welcome this freedom to increase motivation and develop a deeper liking towards their job. If individuals feel a deeper connection with their job, it is thought that individuals will then ultimately take more pride in their work. Participatory management can have a positive perception on some, while on others it could lead to egotistic behaviors, and ultimately disrupt the group's cohesiveness.

Positive effects participatory management has that can lead to positive employee perceptions:

- Employees may have greater job satisfaction and motivation towards their job
- Employees are given the opportunity to use their creativity and innovation which in turn can lead to increased happiness and independence
- Employees have more independence therefore may take more responsibility and pride in their work.
- Employees feel like an integral component towards the organization and therefore have more pride, motivation, and incentive to fulfill the project.

Negative effects participatory management has that can lead to negative employee perceptions:

- Individuals develop egotism / arrogance, therefore making a tense environment among the other workers.
- Egotism / arrogance among workers can lead to supervisors obtaining disgust towards their egotistic employees.

== Examples of implementation ==
The ideals of participatory management have been implemented in several different industries and sectors, both successfully and unsuccessfully.

One such shift in management styles was studied in a public hospital in Alberta, Canada in 2009. The hospital implemented a Care Transformation Initiative that focused on eliminating wasteful activities and actions and applying an atmosphere of participatory management. This initiative was only implemented in one of the programs in the hospital. That program was studied along with another program in which the initiative was not implemented. The main findings of the study showed that, first of all, organizational change is difficult and takes time. Some workers, particularly older ones, were resistant to the change. The management and clinical staff reported little understanding of their specific contribution to organizational decisions. Despite these challenges, staff also reported feeling optimism that this organizational change may lead to better change in the future.

A different study reviewed the effect of participatory management already in effect in the automobile industry in Macedonia. This workplace had already experienced the shift from a top down management style to this new participatory management style. The existence of participation was analyzed through the existence of participatory strategic planning and effective supervisory communication. The findings of this study showed that employees who thought their managers listened to them, and who thought they had a voice in decisions, were significantly happier and more productive than those who did not have the same feelings about the workplace.

== In different cultures ==
According to studies conducted with regard to various cultures, the reported extent of use of participatory leadership among the Iranian managers correlated significantly and positively with the reported extent of use of motivation via teamwork, the reported effectiveness of communication, the reported extent of group participation in the decision-making process, and the reported extent of group participation in the control process. This trend is particularly present among Iranian, Saudi-Arabian, and American cultures. However, American managerial styles cannot simply be transplanted to other cultures; participatory management styles must be adapted to each culture's beliefs system.

Caribbean cultures have also adapted forms of participatory management among managers. According to the Report on the Caribbean Symposium on Social Development held in Barbados in March 1995, "Empowerment is facilitated when agencies make a genuine commitment to shared responsibility and joint decision making, design projects and programs around the perceived needs and the involvement of beneficiaries, adopt community-based and gender-sensitive approaches." Community-based management in these cultures not only improves employer-employee relationships, it enhances employee output as well.

== Criticisms ==
Multiple criticisms exist in opposition to participatory management as a result of its massive change from traditional management styles.

One of the major concerns put forward by the need for massive change is that of high monetary and resource costs. For this reason, institutions often attempt to only partially implement participatory management or do so in stages. During this process the concept fails to be completely respected by leaders and participants and thus fails, and is often reversed before it is ever able to be properly implemented. This indicates that the change required for true participatory management may be too much for larger organizations.

Another issue seen in the participatory management concept is the potential for poor quality participation. Especially when implemented for large scale use, such as with the citizens of a city, it has been shown that if participants are not fully aware of their ability to participate or if they are not properly informed by leaders on what feedback they are expected to provide, there will be either minimal or passive participation.

As a combination of criticisms, an overall result of failure in participatory management is misrepresentation of participants. Along with the factors involved in the previously stated criticisms, misrepresentation can also be due to unexpected participants providing feedback when the expected participants did not, typically seen in city management where participatory management was implemented as an attempt to exploit the community's perceived bias towards a certain decision. This could result in an unexpected voting outcome. As well, any decision could be swayed by participants being coerced within the system to provide feedback in pursuit of someone else's agenda.

Participatory management has been criticized because it is difficult to combine this practice with a more financially oriented approach to restructuring that may require downsizing.

== See also ==
- Participatory Democracy
- Public participation
- Quality circle
- Workers' Self-Management
