= Brukman factory =

Textile factory in Buenos Aires, Argentina

Coordinates: 34°36′59.48″S 58°24′14.73″W

Brukman is a textile factory in Balvanera, Buenos Aires, Argentina (Jujuy 554). Currently under the control of a worker cooperative called "18 de Diciembre", it is among the most famous of the country's "recovered factories".

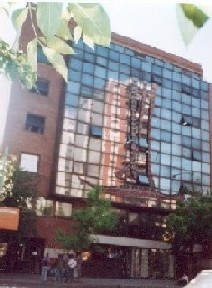
Brukman factory

== Background ==
The Brukman factory suffered the effects of the 1998–2002 Argentine great depression, which first became clearly noticeable as a recession in 1998. Since 1995 business had been shrinking, and Brukman had fired over half of its formerly 300 employees. Sales were dropping and debts had piled up. The workers' salaries were reduced to the point that they could not pay the transportation fare to get to work every day. Rumours also circulated that the owners were preparing to close down the factory.

== Takeover ==
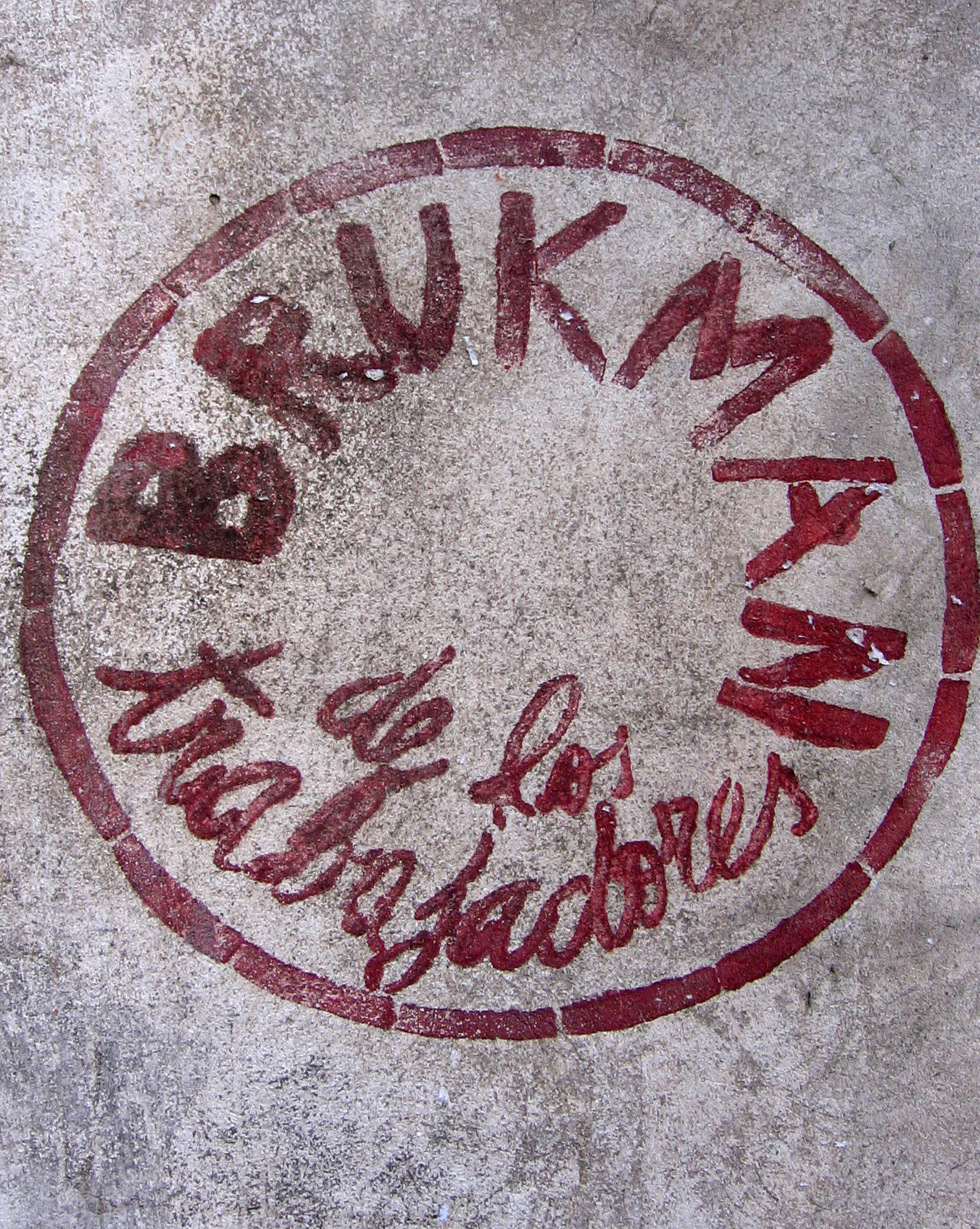
Graffiti near the factory. It says "Brukman belongs to the workers."

On December 18, 2001, about fifty people (most of them women) met at the factory and demanded to be granted a travel allowance, just to be able to keep their jobs. The Brukman brothers, owners of the factory, promised to bring money and left. The workers decided to stay, asked the doorman for the keys, and spent the night at the factory. Their idea was to squat the building and negotiate from that position. But the owners never returned, so they began working again by themselves. In time, the factory made new clients and managed to pay off debts. The workers, organized in an assembly, decided on a fair wage for themselves. After months they were able to raise their salaries and hire ten more employees.

The owners tried to have the workers evicted several times. The last eviction order came from Judge Jorge Rimondi. At midnight, April 18, 2003, more than 300 infantry troops from the Argentine federal police and about 30 civilians succeeded in forcing out the workers. A few hours later, still before dawn, 3,000 demonstrators were already gathered around Brukman to support the workers, including piqueteros and neighbourhood assembly members. Legislators and other officials, as well as human rights groups, met with Judge Rimondi, but the decision was not reversed.

On April 19 the workers of the Zanon ceramics factory (also a recovered factory), in Neuquén, together with local activists, blocked Route 22 to protest in solidarity with the Brukman workers. The Brukman workers received support from numerous other sources. They set up a camp in front of the factory. On April 21, the Buenos Aires provincial police attacked demonstrators who had come to protest the expulsion; there were 20 wounded and a hundred arrests. Eventually the workers regained control of the factory; it continues to function as a cooperative.

== See also ==
- Workers' self-management
- The Take (2004 film)

== Sources and external links ==
- Argentine workers evicted from Brukman factory
- Snapshot of a Nation, by Naomi Klein
- Argentina: Brukman workers kicked out of factory they ran (from The Spark, a Marxist newspaper)
- Brukman: La trilogía (in Spanish and English) - Documentaries about Brukman
- Interview with Brukman worker Celia Martinez
