= Confederación Empresarial de Sociedades Laborales de España =

Spanish enterprise organization

Confederación Empresarial de Sociedades Laborales de España (CONFESAL) is a Spanish enterprise organization whose objectives are the representation and defense of the interests of companies in labor societies in Spain. CONFESAL formed on 4 July 1987.
