= Branko Horvat =

- Born: 24 July 1928; Petrinja, Kingdom of Serbs, Croats and Slovenes (now Croatia)
- Died: 18 December 2003 (aged 75); Zagreb, Croatia
- Education: University of Rijeka
- Children: Olga Horvat and Branka Horvat

Branko Horvat (24 July 1928 – 18 December 2003) was a Croatian economist and politician.

Horvat was born in Petrinja on 24 July 1928. In 1944 during World War II, Horvat and his father Artur Horvat joined the Partisan movement in Croatia. He worked a long time at the Institute of Economic Sciences, the former Planning Institute of the Socialist Federal Republic of Yugoslavia. He was the editor of the journal Economic Analysis and Worker’s Self-Management, and collaborator of the journal Praxis (of the Praxis School), to which he contributed much from an economic viewpoint, though he was never a member of the group. He was also a member of the Economic Institute of Zagreb.

Horvat tried to unite democratic forces on a common platform, but without much success. He was highly critical of the economic policy of the Franjo Tuđman government (as he was before of the communist). A democratic socialist, he advocated a model of market socialism, dubbed the Illyrian model, where firms were owned and self-managed by their workers and competed with each other in open and free markets. In 1992 he founded and became president of the Social Democratic Union. Horvat organized a Balkan Conference with the primary aim of restoring cooperation between Yugoslav forces.

His most widely known study is The Political Economy of Socialism (published in 1982 in English, in 1984 in Croatian, and in 2001 in Chinese). He was nominated for the Nobel Prize in Economics in 1983.

Branko Horvat's wife, Ranka Peašinović, was a professor at the University of Zagreb.

A street in Pristina, Kosovo was named in Horvat's honour.

== Sources ==
- Romano, Jaša (1980). Jevreji Jugoslavije 1941-1945: žrtve genocida i učesnici narodnooslobodilačkog rata [The Jews of Yugoslavia 1941-1945: victims of genocide and participants in the national liberation war] (in Bosnian). Beograd: Jevrejski Istorijski Muzej, Saveza jevrejskih opština Jugoslavije.
