= Industrial democracy =

Arrangement which involves workers making decisions

Industrial democracy is an arrangement which involves workers making decisions, sharing responsibility and authority in the workplace. While in participative management organizational designs workers are listened to and take part in the decision-making process, in organizations employing industrial democracy they also have the final decisive power, including in matters of organizational design and hierarchy.

In company law, the term generally used is co-determination, following the German word Mitbestimmung. In Germany, companies with more than 2000 employees (or more than 1000 employees in the coal and steel industries) have half of their supervisory boards of directors (which elect management) elected by the shareholders and half by the workers.

Although industrial democracy generally refers to the organization model in which workplaces are run directly by the people who work in them in place of private or state ownership of the means of production, there are also representative forms of industrial democracy. Representative industrial democracy includes decision-making structures such as the formation of committees and consultative bodies to facilitate communication between management, unions, and staff.

== History ==
The anarchist thinker Pierre-Joseph Proudhon used the term "industrial democracy" in the 1850s to describe the vision of workplace democracy he had first raised in the 1840s with What is Property? Or, an Inquiry into the Principle of Right and of Government, (management "must be chosen from the workers by the workers themselves, and must fulfil the conditions of eligibility.") He repeated this call in later works like General Idea of the Revolution.

In late nineteenth century, and at the beginning of the twentieth century, industrial democracy, along with anarcho-syndicalism and new unionism, represented one of the dominant themes in revolutionary socialism and played a prominent role in international labour movements. The term industrial democracy was also used by British socialist reformers Sidney and Beatrice Webb in their 1897 book Industrial Democracy. The Webbs used the term to refer to trade unions and the process of collective bargaining.

At the point of production, the introduction of mandatory works councils and voluntary schemes of workers' participation (e.g. semi-autonomous groups) have a long tradition in European countries.

== See also ==
- UK labour law and German labour law
- Workers' self-management
- Collective Bargaining
- Co-determination
- Distributism
- Industrial Relations
- Holacracy
- Industrial Workers of the World
- New unionism
- Socialist Party USA
- Social ownership
- League for Industrial Democracy
- Workers' council
- Workplace democracy
- Common ownership
