= Hotel Bauen =

Argentine hotel

Coordinates: 34°36′18″S 58°23′33″W

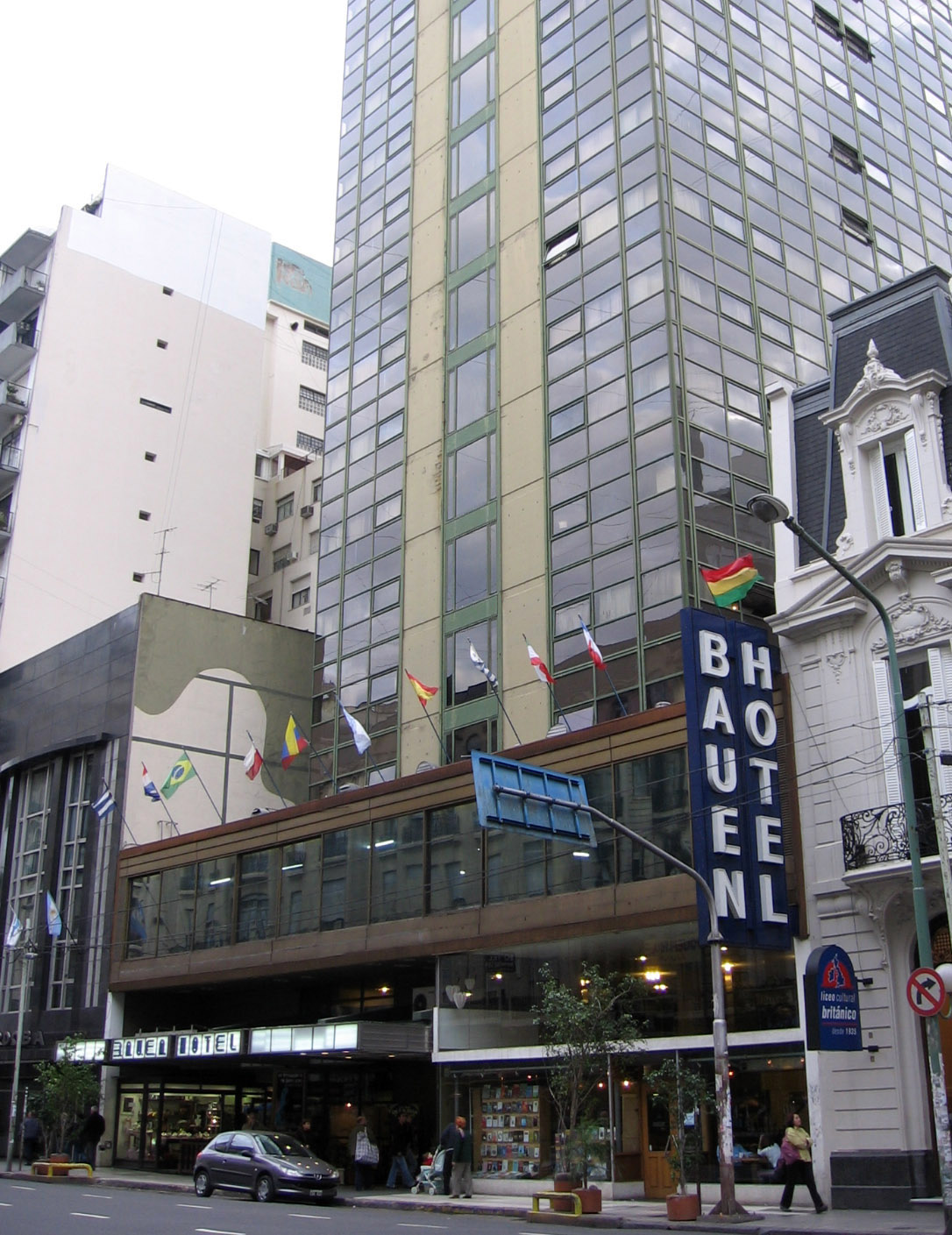
The Hotel Bauen

The Hotel Bauen was a recuperated business located at 360 Callao Avenue in Buenos Aires run collectively by its workers, serving both as a hotel and as a free meeting place for Argentine leftist and workers' groups. It is also used as a personal residence by some of the worker-owners.

Inaugurated in 1978, the four-star establishment received generous government subsidies in anticipation of the 1978 FIFA World Cup, which took place in Buenos Aires that June. The original owner, Marcelo Iurcovich, received US$37 million for its development in 1976 from the Banco Nacional de Desarollo (BANADE), a state-owned business lender later absorbed into the Banco de la Nación Argentina. The hotel's finances worsened during the crisis in the early 2000s and after systematic firings, the Hotel Bauen was closed on December 28, 2001.

In March 2003, with the help of the Movimiento Nacional de Empresas Recuperadas (National Movement of Recovered Businesses, MNER), the hotel's former employees occupied the building. While fighting for ownership through activism and negotiation, they began repairs and slowly reopened for business.

However, the long-term legality of the worker's rights to ownership and operation were ambiguous. On October 21, 2005, the hotel was informed that, while a legal right of former employees to keep residence in the hotel was recognised, they were not permitted to function as a business. Upon delivery of this notice, entrances were closed off with official tape, but this tape was quickly removed by hotel workers, and business operations continue today.

In May 2006, Judge Carla Cavaliere officially approved the suspension of the closure order. The ownership of the building remains unclear. A bill of expropriation, the Ley Nacional de Expropiación, would have definitively entitled the Bauen workers to ownership of the hotel. Sponsored by Deputy Victoria Donda in the National Congress, the bill introduced in 2007 but failed to pass. During the 2010s, the hotel, still under the worker cooperative's management, barely managed to stay open. It finally closed down in mid-2020, citing the COVID-19 pandemic. Under a new court order, the building is to return to its original owners.
