= Workers' self-management =

Form of organizational management

Workers' self-management, also referred to as labor management and organizational self-management, is a form of organizational management based on self-directed work processes on the part of an organization's workforce. Self-management is a defining characteristic of socialism, with proposals for self-management having appeared many times throughout the history of the socialist movement, advocated variously by democratic, libertarian and market socialists as well as anarchists and communists.

There are many variations of self-management. In some variants, all the worker-members manage the enterprise directly through assemblies while in other forms workers exercise management functions indirectly through the election of specialist managers. Self-management may include worker supervision and oversight of an organization by elected bodies, the election of specialized managers, or self-directed management without any specialized managers as such. The goals of self-management are to improve performance by granting workers greater autonomy in their day-to-day operations, boosting morale, reducing alienation and eliminating exploitation when paired with employee ownership.

An enterprise that is self-managed is referred to as a labour-managed firm. Self-management refers to control rights within a productive organization, being distinct from the questions of ownership and what economic system the organization operates under. Self-management of an organization may coincide with employee ownership of that organization, but self-management can also exist in the context of organizations under public ownership and to a limited extent within private companies in the form of co-determination and worker representation on the board of directors.

== Economic theory ==
An economic system consisting of self-managed enterprises is sometimes referred to as a participatory economy, self-managed economy, or cooperative economy. This economic model is a major version of market socialism and decentralized planned economy, stemming from the notion that people should be able to participate in making the decisions that affect their well-being. The major proponents of self-managed market socialism in the 20th century include the economists Benjamin N. Ward, Jaroslav Vanek and Branko Horvat. Horvat says that participation is not simply more desirable, but also more economically viable than traditional hierarchical and authoritarian management as demonstrated by econometric measurements which indicate an increase in efficiency with greater participation in decision-making. Writing from the perspective of socialist Yugoslavia in the early 1980s, Horvat suggested that the larger world was moving toward a self-governing socialistic mode of organization as well.

=== Labor managed firm ===
The theory of the labor managed firm explains the behavior, performance and nature of self-managed organizational forms. Although self-managed (or labor-managed) firms can coincide with worker ownership (employee ownership), the two are distinct concepts and one need not imply the other.

==== Neoclassical economics ====
According to traditional neoclassical economic theory, in a competitive market economy ownership of capital assets by labor (the workforce of a given firm) should have no significant impact on firm performance.

Much of the research on labor-managed firms in the neoclassical tradition revolved around the question of the presumed maximand (objective function) of such firms (i.e. the answer to the question "what do labor-managed firms maximize?", e.g. income per worker or profits) and its implications. The first model of a labor-managed firm in this tradition has been suggested by American economist Benjamin Ward in 1958 who was interested in the analysis of Yugoslav firms. According to Ward, the labor-managed firm strives to maximize income per worker as contrasted with the traditional capitalist firms' objective function of maximizing profit for external owners. Based on this assumption, Ward presented an analysis that was critical of labor-managed firms. In particular, he argued that a supply curve of a labor-managed firm has a negative slope: an increase in the market price of the product produced by a labor-managed firm will not make it increase production and hire new members. It followed that an economy consisting of labor-managed firms would have a tendency to underutilize labor and tend toward higher rates of unemployment. Ward's model was developed further by Evsey Domar and generalized by Jaroslav Vaněk.

These purely theoretical analyses were criticized by Yugoslav economist Branko Horvat in 1971 who argued for empirical analysis of actually existing labor-managed Yugoslav firms and practices utilized by their members. In particular, he noted that workers fix wages at the beginning of a year and then adjust them based on the earnings of the enterprise. He noted that this behavioral rule, if made a part of the theoretical model, implies that the market behavior of a labor-managed firm is, contrary to theses by Ward and his followers, much more similar to the hypothetical behavior of a "traditional", profit-maximizing firm.

Building on a larger body of empirical studies, contemporary Canadian economist Gregory Dow has carried out extensive theoretical research on labor-managed firms from the neoclassical perspective, focusing on explaining the rarity of labor-managed firms relative to capital-managed ones.

=== Classical economics ===
In the 19th century, the idea of a self-managed economy was first fully articulated by the anarchist philosopher and economist Pierre-Joseph Proudhon. This economic model was called mutualism to highlight the mutual relationship among individuals in this system and involved cooperatives operating in a free-market economy.

The classical liberal philosopher and economist John Stuart Mill believed that worker-run and owned cooperatives would eventually displace traditional capitalist (capital-managed) firms in the competitive market economy due to their superior efficiency and stronger incentive structure.

The form of association, however, which if mankind continue to improve, must be expected in the end to predominate, is not that which can exist between a capitalist as chief, and work-people without a voice in the management, but the association of the labourers themselves on terms of equality, collectively owning the capital with which they carry on their operations and working under managers elected and removable by themselves.

— John Stuart Mill, Principles of Principles of Political Economy IV, Ch. 7

While both Mill and Karl Marx thought that democratic worker management would be more efficient in the long run compared with hierarchical management, Marx was not hopeful about the prospects of labor-managed and owned firms as a means to displace traditional capitalist firms in the market economy. Despite their advantages in efficiency, in Western market economies the labor-managed firm is comparatively rare.

Karl Marx championed the idea of a free association of producers as a characteristic of communist society, where self-management processes replaced the traditional notion of the centralized state. This concept is related to the Marxist idea of transcending alienation.

=== Soviet-type economic planning ===
The Soviet-type economic model as practiced in the former USSR and Eastern Bloc (самоуправление; samoupravlenie) was introduced in the state-owned enterprises in the 1980s. It is criticized by socialists for its lack of widespread self-management and management input on the part of workers in enterprises.

== Management science ==
In his book Drive: The Surprising Truth About What Motivates Us, Daniel H. Pink argues on the basis of empirical evidence that self-management/self-directed processes, mastery, worker autonomy and purpose (defined as intrinsic rewards) are much more effective incentives than monetary gain (extrinsic rewards). According to Pink, for the vast majority of work in the 21st century self-management and related intrinsic incentives are far more crucial than outdated notions of hierarchical management and an overreliance on monetary compensation as reward.

More recent research suggests that incentives and bonuses can have positive effects on performance and autonomous motivation. According to this research, the key is aligning bonuses and incentives to reinforce, rather than hamper, a sense of autonomy, competence and relatedness (the three needs that self determination theory identifies for autonomous motivation).

== Political movements ==
=== Europe ===
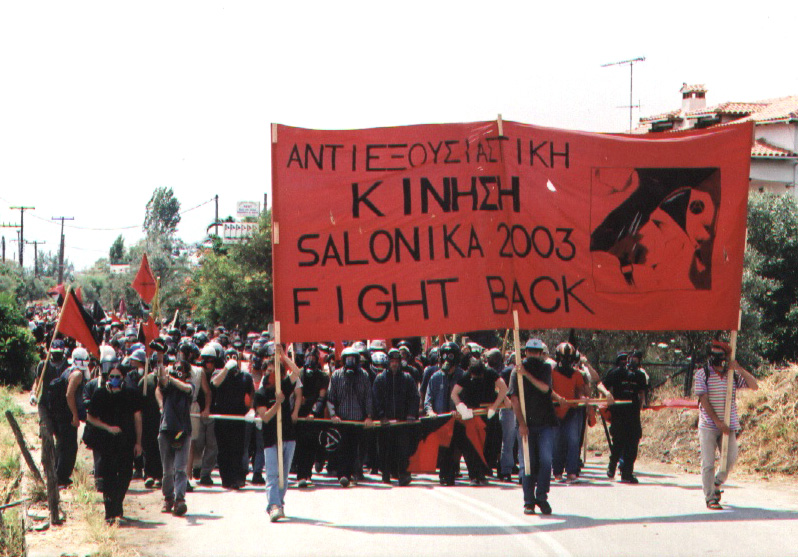
Protests in Greece advocating for worker management and worker defense

One significant experiment with workers' self-management took place during the Spanish Revolution (1936–1939). In his book Anarcho-Syndicalism (1938), Rudolf Rocker stated:

But by taking the land and the industrial plants under their own management they have taken the first and most important step on the road to Socialism. Above all, they (the Workers' and peasants self-management) have proved that the workers, even without the capitalists, are able to carry on production and to do it better than a lot of profit-hungry entrepreneurs.

After May 1968 in France, LIP factory, a clockwork factory based in Besançon, became self-managed starting in 1973 after the management's decision to liquidate it. The LIP experience was an emblematic social conflict of post-1968 in France. CFDT (the CCT as it was referred to in Northern Spain), trade-unionist Charles Piaget led the strike in which workers claimed the means of production. The Unified Socialist Party (PSU) which included former Radical Pierre Mendès-France was in favour of autogestión or self-management.

In the Basque Country of Spain, the Mondragon Cooperative Corporation represents perhaps the longest lasting and most successful example of workers' self-management in the world. It has been touted by a diverse group of people such as the Marxian economist Richard D. Wolff and the research book Capital and the Debt Trap by Claudia Sanchez Bajo and Bruno Roelants as an example of how the economy can be organized on an alternative to the capitalist mode of production.

Following the 2008 financial crisis, many factories were occupied and became self-managed in Greece, France, Italy, Germany and Turkey.

In Greece, solidarity-based distribution is partially the result of austerity policies' privatization of public services, which exacerbates on-the-ground solidarity activities. These have mostly emerged as a consequence of ambitious politicized thinking and mobilization, as well as a practical formulation that ensures degrees of living by transforming informal solidarity networks into remunerative distribution cooperatives. This dialectic, echoes the idea of formally managing the crisis, which reproduces itself not in spite of, but because of, official policy initiatives to combat it. Workers' collectives and cooperatives, Self-Help Groups, Local Exchange Trade Systems (LETS), Freecycle networks and Timebanks, and the first worker-occupied factory are examples of non-capitalist social experiments and innovations that have emerged in Greece since 2012.

==== Yugoslavia ====
At the height of the Cold War, Yugoslavia, as a consequence of the Tito-Stalin split, pursued and advocated for, what was officially called, socialist self-management in distinction from the Eastern Bloc countries, all of which practiced central planning and centralized management of their economies. It replaced central planning with planning basic proportions that was supposed to stop "the chaos of social production and distribution that is innate to capitalism". It was organized according to the theories of Josip Broz Tito and more directly Edvard Kardelj. Yugoslav economist Branko Horvat also made a significant contribution to the theory of workers' self-management (radničko samoupravljanje) as practiced in Yugoslavia. Due to Yugoslavia's neutrality and its leading role in the Non-Aligned Movement, Yugoslav companies exported to both Western and Eastern markets. Yugoslav companies carried out construction of numerous major infrastructural and industrial projects in Africa, Europe and Asia.

In 1950, the Law on self-management introduced workers' councils. The "beginning of the end of bureaucracy" was declared along the pretenses of the Marxist concept of withering away of the state under the "Factories to the workers!" parole. According to Boris Kanzleiter, the inspiration for workers' councils came from the People's councils – the revolutionary governing bodies of the People's Liberation Army and the Paris Commune. The 1953 Yugoslav Constitutional Law introduced self-management in the constitutional matter and transformed state property into social property. The 1963 Yugoslav Constitution, also called the Charter of Self-management, defined self-management and social property as supreme values and it defined Yugoslavia as a "socialist self-managed democratic community".

The Law of Associated Labor of 1976 represented the last stage of the development of Yugoslav self-management. On the grounds of the 1974 Yugoslav constitution, it created a completely autonomous system grounded in direct sovereignty of the worker and citizen. It foresaw the formation of Basic Organizations of Associated Labor (BOAL) as the basic economic units that every worker had to be a part of based on the precise role played by that worker in the production process. It associated with other BOALs to form an Organization of Associated Labour (OAL) that could, with other OALs form Complex Organizations of Associated Labor. The assembly that consisted of all the workers' of a BOAL elected a delegate, which was bound with an imperative mandate, into the workers' council of the OAL that decided on all matters: from electing the director, to decisions on salaries, investments, association, development and specific production goals. Another feature of Yugoslav self-management were Self-management agreements and Social compacts, these replaced classical contracts. The goal of OALs was not for-profit but a social goal – it was supposed to facilitate education, healthcare, employment and resolving the housing issue.

Macro-economic reforms and structural adjustment programs that were imposed by the International Monetary Fund (IMF) and the World Bank brought an end to workers' self-management in Yugoslavia.

=== Empresas recuperadas movement ===
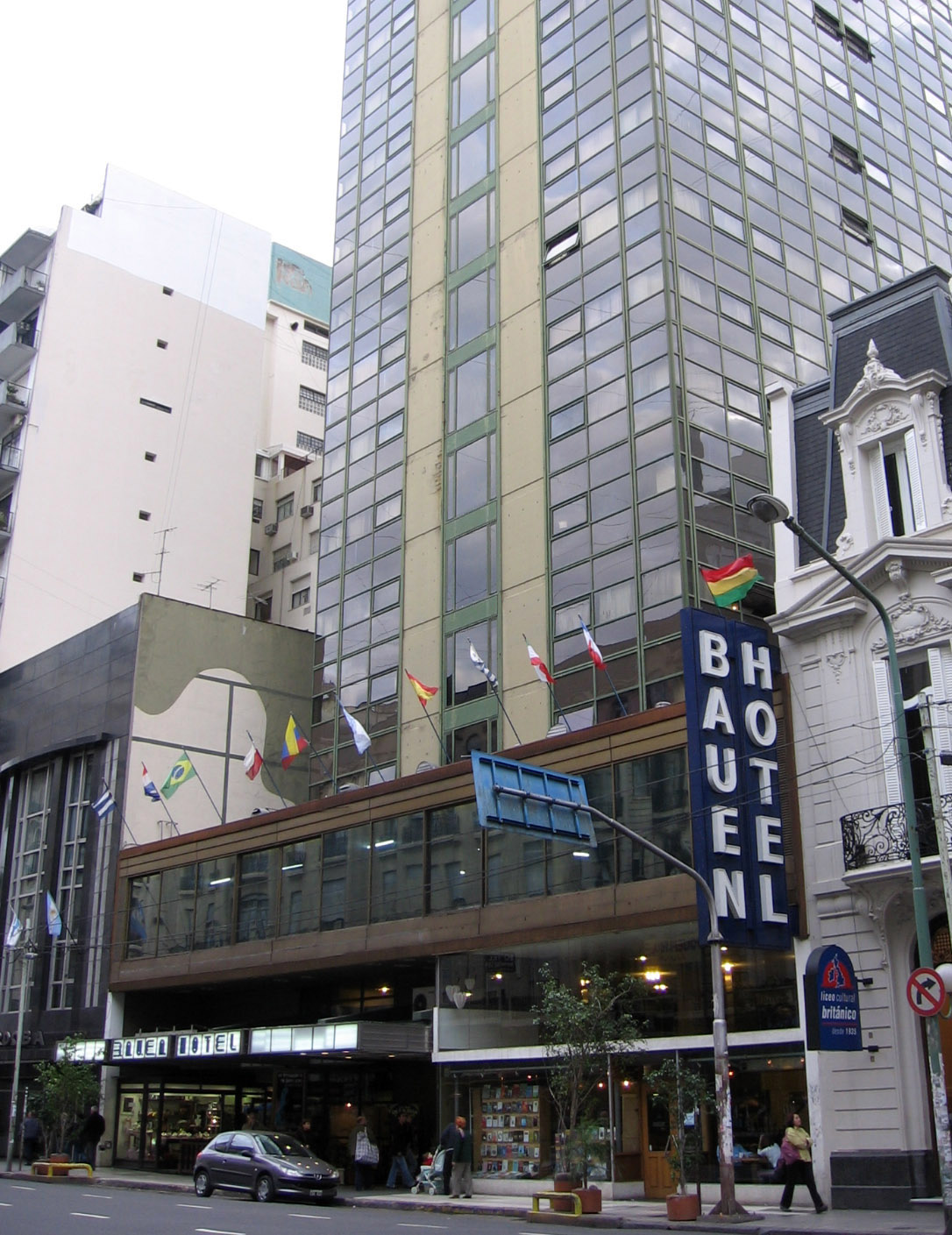
The Hotel Bauen in Buenos Aires, occupied and self-managed since 2003

English-language discussions of this phenomenon may employ several different translations of the original Spanish expression other than recovered factory. For example, worker-recuperated enterprise, recuperated/recovered factory/business/company, worker-recovered factory/business, worker-recuperated/recovered company, worker-reclaimed factory, and worker-run factory have been noted. The phenomenon is also known as autogestión.

Argentina's empresas recuperadas movement emerged in response to the run up and aftershocks of Argentina's 2001 economic crisis. Empresas recuperadas means "reclaimed/recovered/recuperated enterprises/factories/companies". The Spanish verb recuperar means not only "to get back", "to take back" or "to reclaim", but also "to put back into good condition".

The movement emerged as a response to the years of crisis leading up to and including Argentina's 2001 economic crisis. By 2001–2002, around 200 Argentine companies were recuperated by their workers and turned into worker co-operatives. Prominent examples include the Brukman factory, the Hotel Bauen and FaSinPat (formerly known as Zanon). As of 2020, around 16,000 Argentine workers run close to 400 recuperated factories.

The phenomenon of empresas recuperadas ("recovered enterprises") is not new in Argentina. Rather, such social movements were completely dismantled during the so-called Dirty War in the 1970s. Thus, during Héctor Cámpora's first months of government (May–July 1973), a rather moderate and left-wing Peronist, approximately 600 social conflicts, strikes and factory occupations had taken place.

The proliferation of these "recuperations" has led to the formation of a recuperated factory movement which has ties to a diverse political network including socialists, Peronists, anarchists and communists. Organizationally, this includes two major federations of recovered factories, the larger Movimiento Nacional de Empresas Recuperadas (National Movement of Recuperated Businesses, or MNER) on the left and the smaller National Movement of Recuperated Factories (MNFR) on the right.

The movement led in 2011 to a new bankruptcy law that facilitates take over by the workers. The legislation was signed into law by President Cristina Kirchner on June 29, 2011.

== See also ==
- Agile software development
- Collectivist anarchism
- Consensus decision-making
- Council communism
- Industrial democracy
- Lean manufacturing
- Open allocation
- Participatory economics
- Socialization (economics)
- Titoism
- Workplace democracy
- Works council

=== Self-managed organizations ===
- 1971 Harco work-in, a four-week work-in by Australian steelworkers
- Carlist Party
- Confederación Empresarial de Sociedades Laborales de España
- Haier Group Corporation, the world's largest self-managed company
- Mondragón Corporation, the world's largest group of industrial cooperative companies
- The Morning Star Company, a fully self-managed private company
- The Lucas Plan
- Orpheus Chamber Orchestra
- Paris Commune
- Springfield ReManufacturing
- Unified Socialist Party (France)
- United States Federation of Worker Cooperatives
- W. L. Gore and Associates, one of the oldest, largest and most innovative self-managed companies worldwide
