= The Harrison Studio =

American social and environmental artists

The Harrison Studio consists of Helen Mayer Harrison (1927–2018) and Newton Harrison (1932–2022) who are among the earliest and the best known social and environmental artists. Often simply referred to as “The Harrisons”, Helen and Newton have produced multimedia work across a vast range of disciplines. They worked in collaboration with biologists, ecologists, historians, activists, architects, urban planners and fellow artists to initiate dialogues and create works exploring biodiversity and community development. Helen and Newton Harrison were both Professors Emeriti at University of California, Santa Cruz, and University of California, San Diego. They have had numerous international solo exhibitions and their work is in the collections of many public institutions including the Pompidou Center, the Museum of Modern Art, the San Jose Museum of Art, the Nevada Museum of Art, and the Chicago Museum of Contemporary Art. In 2013 the Harrisons became the first recipients of the Corlis Benefideo Award for Imaginative Cartography. Stanford University Libraries acquired The Helen and Newton Harrison Papers, an extensive archive that documents their life and work with a significant amount of audiovisual material and born-digital files.

== Early life and education ==
Helen Mayer was born on July 1, 1927, in the easternmost borough of New York City Queens to an academic family: Both parents were schoolteachers, and her father a mathematician. Helen graduated Forest Hills High School in 1943 at sixteen years old, earning a full tuition scholarship to Cornell University. At Cornelle, she was encouraged to study mathematics due to her natural ability, but instead majored in psychology for two years; ultimately she returned home to earn her bachelor's degree in English from Queens College in 1948. In 1952, she earned a master's degree in the philosophy of education from New York University (NYU).

Newton Abner Harrison was born on October 20, 1932, in the New York City borough of Brooklyn and raised in the nearby suburb of New Rochelle. Newton's grandfather Simon W. Farber was a tinsmith who emigrated from Russia seeking prosperity in the late 19th century. He opened a small brassware shop on the Lower East Side of Manhattan selling kitchen utensils and ornamental objects; customers appreciated the immediacy and quality of his product as compared to the expensive brassware imported from Europe. When Simon transitioned from hand hammering to metal spinning with an automated machine lathe, both production and sales dramatically increased. In 1907 he opened a manufacturing plant in Brooklyn to further expand his line of kitchen utensils, which he branded Farberware. The Meyer Corporation acquired Farberware in 1997 and promotes the company as one of the oldest and most trusted brands in American housewares.

At age fifteen Newton told his parents Estelle Farber and Harvey Harrison that he wanted to become an artist. They asked that he continue his studies at Peddie Prep High School, a college preparatory school in New Jersey. Meanwhile, Newton was riding his bicycle all over New Rochelle. He located the New Rochelle's celebrated sculptor Michael Lantz. Newton showed Lantz a horse he made the year earlier. Lantz responded that he hadn't done a horse that well at 14. Lantz accepted him as his apprentice. Newton assisted Lantz during school breaks during high school and intermittently during his college years from 1948 through 1953. The apprenticeship included lessons in modeling, plaster casting, woodwork, and the creation of architectural scale models as well as drafting and reading architectural blueprints. Newton attended Antioch College in Yellow Springs, Ohio for several years before transferring to the Pennsylvania Academy of the Fine Arts (PAFA) in Philadelphia to formalize his study of sculpture. PAFA faculty and local art collectors encouraged Newton to develop his Rodin-like approach to the human figure: his ability to convey the poetic motions of the body and soul using clay.

Helen and Newton married in 1953. There is a notable collection of letters in the Harrison Papers at Stanford written and received by the Harrisons on their first trip abroad to Florence, Italy where they lived from 1957 to 1960 with partial funding from PAFA's Scheidt Memorial Scholarship and the rest financed by Newton's parents Estelle and Harvey. The Florence letters express the couple's experience living abroad and contemplating the purpose of their lives. Helen was the director of the International Nursery School in Florence for two of the three years they lived abroad, although the focus of the letters is Newton's resolve to become a professional artist. "Many thanks," begins one letter to Estelle and Harvey, for you both "enable us to find ourselves. The way of the artist is not an easy one, but the rewards for us are many, and the promise of being able to use ourselves significantly according to our capacities is the only promise that holds meaning for us."

The Harrisons returned from Florence to the bustling New York City art scene in 1960. Newton initially found work teaching experimental painting to children at Henry Street Settlement and neighborhood centers. He then enrolled at the Yale University School of Art and Architecture to complete his bachelor and master's degree in fine arts. The Korean War draft had interrupted progress towards his bachelor's degree at PAFA. He enrolled in 1952, but was then obliged to serve two years in the U.S. Army from 1953 to 1955. The Harrisons' time living abroad in Florence had further postponed completion of his bachelor's degree. In the early 1960s New York City was ground zero for the Greenbergian ethos of abstract painting, emphasizing the autonomy and primacy of paint applied to a transcendent picture plane.

Helen was extremely involved with various humanitarian activities in the early 1960s. Helen "threw herself into a cultural scene that merged the art world, the folk music world and the peace movement. She hosted concerts and Hootenannies to raise funds for the civil rights movement and other causes, befriending musicians ranging from the Clancy Brothers to Archie Shepp. She founded the Tompkins Square Peace Center. The group she helped put together included Dorothy Day of the Catholic Worker, Dave McReynolds of the War Resisters League, Judith Malina and Julian Beck of the Living Theater, David Dellinger of the Pacifist Anarchist Group, Robert Gilmore from the American Friends Service Committee. She was the first New York coordinator for the Women's Strike for Peace, a major force in the anti-war movement and a critical organization behind the 1964 Nuclear Test Ban treaty."

Newton had begun to feel that the conventions of figure modeling and perspective had become extremely passé. With these influences, Newton set sculpture aside and began establishing himself as a painter. Sewell Sillman and Al Held were two key mentors for Newton during his time at Yale. Combining lessons in color theory with Sillman and lessons in hard-edged abstraction with Held, he painted bold compositions. Yet those paintings retained their objectness. They appeared as if pigmented sculptures set in relation to the surrounding architecture."

Newton graduated from Yale in 1965 at age thirty-two with both a bachelor's and master's degree in fine art. He then secured his first faculty position as assistant professor in Charge of Visual Fundamentals at the University of New Mexico (UNM). With four school-aged children and her own set of degrees, Helen also went back to work at UNM teaching literature, although she oriented her work in the field of education more broadly. Helen wanted to raise the issue of equality and access to good education at every level of society. She and Newton collaborated on writing an essay exploring new directions in arts education for high school dropouts. Entitled "Dropouts and a 'Design for Living'," the essay was published in New Perspectives on Poverty.

The Harrisons moved to La Jolla, California, in 1967 when abstract expressionist painter Paul Brach, the founding chair of the Visual Arts Department at UC San Diego, recruited Newton to join his faculty. Hints of Helen's growing artistic collaboration with Newton were already apparent in during this time. "The sense from the literature and lecture circuit was that Newton was the “alchemist” and builder; Helen the scholar and theorist who also brought photography and text to the practice; this is rhetorically embraced in an early scripting of their collaboration..."

Newton began a three-year period of intensive experimentation in the expanded field. During this time he engaged directly and freely with engineers, biologists, politicians, and even corporations outside the domain of art. He participated in Billy Kluver's Experiments in Art and Technology as well as Maurice Tuchman's Art and Technology program at the Los Angeles County Museum of Art (LACMA). He produced schematic designs for artworks exploring the organic and interactive behavior of living and technological systems, and began thinking about growth processes and transformations as the work of art more so than images and objects.

== Switching careers midstream ==
Helen and Newton proceeded along different paths and at different speeds to transform their careers after arriving at UC San Diego in 1967. The unsettled period of reflecting on ideas about science, technology, equality, and justice in the late 1960s is key to understanding their decision to begin collaborating with one another in 1970 on the occasion of the "Furs and Feathers" exhibition at the Museum of Contemporary Crafts in New York City. In a work called An Ecological Nerve Center presented at the Museum of Contemporary Crafts, they inaugurated a career of experimenting in the production as well as display of art as knowledge informing social and environmental change.

Moving to California in 1967, Helen enrolled at United States International University (known today as Alliant International University) to begin an interdisciplinary doctoral program in the Graduate School of Leadership and Human Behavior. With continuing concern for equality and social justice, she was looking to refresh and synthesize three areas of expertise—language, learning, and social psychology—so that she could contribute research towards ensuring that all students have equal prospects for living well. However, Helen withdrew from the doctoral program after joined UC Extension Division as an education program coordinator in 1969 and promoting to a director position in 1970. During her tenure as director of UC Extension Division's education programs, enrollment and course offerings rose from an average of forty-two classes to fifty-five classes per quarter. Helen's goal was to provide teachers of San Diego County with courses to enhance their level of expertise in subject areas, while also providing them with a deeper understanding of psychology and childhood development. She expanded the reach of UC Extension Division's education programs to more than ten school districts in the county and introduced one-day and two-week conferences that drew participants from across the country.

While studying at United States International University, Helen also collected writings by the vanguard of the Women's Liberation Movement including: Alice S. Rossi's "Status of Women in Graduate Departments of Sociology: 1968-1969," accepted for publication in The American Sociologist (Fall 1969) and made available through the Women's Caucus of the American Sociological Association at their San Francisco convention; Beverly Jones and Judith Brown's "Toward a Female Liberation Movement," published by New England Free Press; and Naomi Weisstein's "Kinde, Kuche, Kirche as Scientific Law: Psychology Constructs the Female," published by New England Free Press. In the wake of second wave feminism, Helen's concern for equality and social justice had grown to include, in a more direct way, her own rights as a woman to use herself significantly according to her own capacities and to be recognized for her contributions.

Helen's first extended engagement with Newton's work was in "Fur and Feathers" where the research of 3 graduate students that she guided was foundational. At this stage Helen was only contributing to the research portion when she wasn't busy with her job designing classes and curriculums at the UCSD Extension. Helen and Newton had an informal collaboration going back as early as the 1950s. When they moved to the Lower East Side, they helped form the Tompkins Square Peace center, a companion to the Greenwich Village Peace Center. The object of their collective work here led to the Woman's March on Washington in an effort to get Kennedy to stop over-ground testing as strontium 90 from atomic testing was showing up in mother's milk. Later, Helen became the first New York coordinator for Women's Strike for Peace. Their work together was comprehensive, but informal during this period. Helen was being considered for the role of Vice Chancellor at UC Extension. She asked Newton how he would feel about eating breakfast a Vice Chancellor every morning. Newton responded that he would rather do so with an artist. Newton was envisioning works that grew in scale and complexity, and new that these could not be accomplished alone.

In his review of the "Furs and Feathers" exhibition, Richard Elman described gazing at "a large white map of the world in the main entranceway that was annotated densely with print, especially the U.S. portion, in tones of red and gray to distinguish 'endangered' from 'exterminated' species of wildlife." Even more impressionable was an accompanying audio recording that Elman recalls as "a litany, a casualty list, intoned in a flat dispirited voice. On and on it went for quite some fifteen minutes about the hunting pursuits of the sheiks of the Arabian peninsula, entire populations of sea birds, monkeys, lions, vincuñas, and the great auk."

Shortly thereafter, Helen decided to resign from her director position with UC Extension Division's education programs to pursue art full-time in 1972. In her resignation letter, she wrote with affection, "I have had too much fun here! However, I am becoming an artist in my old age and I am doing what we have offered a number of Extension courses about - 'switching careers midstream'." "Fur and Feathers" was the final work for which Helen did not receive equal credit with Newton after they began their official artistic partnership.

Pivotal to the story of Helen solidifying her career as an artist are two solo works through which she arrived at her own avant-garde understanding of participation in growth form and growth activism. Strawberry Jam (1973), the first solo work, began when Dextra Frankel, Director of the Art Gallery of California State University at Fullerton, contacted Helen in February 1973 to inquire if she would like to participate as a solo artist in a large group exhibition entitled "In a Bottle." As Helen recalls in a typewritten statement reflecting back on the exhibition: “I had just finished assisting Newton Harrison with a work called Strawberry Wall and he suggested that I do a performance of making jam, since I did the feasts for his growth works, and I thought—what goes in a bottle but Jam.” On a separate piece of paper, torn from an old notepad of the English Language and Literature Department at the University of New Mexico (where Helen taught from 1965 to 1967), she recorded a stream of consciousness that further elaborates on her creative process: “One of the things to do with a bottle is fill it. One of the basic things to fill a bottle with is food. One makes the food and preserves it in the bottle. Collecting bottles and filling them with food…imagine there is no food for us this year and we have to make next year's food—Food Wall—give up its yield to other people in a series of feasts—abundance ritual—record it.” Strawberry Jam thus became an endurance performance in which Helen made fifteen jars of strawberry jam per day for six consecutive days using only natural ingredients like lemon juice and wine to thicken the mixture, and as little sugar as possible to acquaint herself with the sweet flavor of the fruit itself. The recipes varied each day based on the sweetness of the berries plucked from the plants, and the jam became increasingly tart as Helen came to appreciate the way lemon and wine enhanced the acidic undertone of the berries. The initial five days of the performance took place in private. On the sixth day, Helen staged the making of Strawberry Jam for an audience at the Art Gallery of California State College at Fullerton. And on the seventh day, she rested.

Six months later Helen resumed making strawberry jam as an artistic research project. She had continued ruminating on the conceptual imagery of the bottle and its attendant ideology of preservation. She wondered how the medium of photography would serve as a tool of preservation or perhaps continuity, not of the fruit itself, but of the knowledge and skill required to plant, grow, and harvest strawberries in cycles of regeneration with moments of abundance and scarcity. As a studio experiment, Helen used square wall-mounted shelves to arrange a canvas-like grid composition of jars filled with jam left over from the Fullerton exhibition. She then entreated Philip Steinmetz, a conceptual artist and photographer who in 1971 had joined the Visual Arts Department faculty at UC San Diego, to make two color images: one of abundance with all the jars in place so as to fill the shelves, and one of scarcity with only a few jars in place. She also produced a third and compelling image in which she placed just three jars on top of a short stack of books, including Jack Burnham's The Structure of Art, and printed several copies such that she could modify the composition using collage techniques. With collage, Helen could adjust the quantity of jars and stack them in different cumulative formations as a way of reflecting on the merits of growth form and growth activism by women in relation to the so-called structure of art.

Off Strawberry Wall (1974), Helen's second solo work, began when feminist art historian Arlene Raven invited Helen to participate in the exhibition program at the Women's Building of Los Angeles. Helen paired up with Joyce Shaw for a three-week exhibition at Grandview One Gallery inside the Women's Building. The artist statement that she produced for this show further demonstrates the fluidness of her thinking about time, labor, culture, art, preservation, and continuity of life. In this statement, she explained that both strawberry works are “spin-offs and amusements from feasts and performances that I have done in other contexts. I am interested in the relationship between the morphologies and transformations that happen in living and growing and cooking and the transformations that we call art. I am especially interested in those intentional transformations that make objects stand for process. The play of time, nature and artifice is an important element in my work and I am intrigued by the juxtaposition of real growth strawberries, shelf-life for the jam and the instantaneous transformations of the camera and collage.” On the largest wall of Grandview One Gallery, Helen hung the Steinmetz photographs alongside her exploratory collage that questioned the merits of work by women in relation to the structure of art. On an adjacent wall, she installed a low-lying horizontal pasture of strawberry plants in modular container-like forms that Newton had designed for Survival Pieces. But the closing of the exhibition on March 23, 1974, would coincide with a special celebration explicitly called "A Woman Made Day" to include an array of events such as a gynecological self-help slideshow by the Feminist Women's Health Center, a karate and self-defense demonstration by Karen Iwafuchi, an open forum on survival and power by the Commission Against Rape, a presentation about the creation of the Feminist Studio Workshop (the entity that founded the Women's Building), and a jamming performance by Helen.

With Strawberry Jam (1973) and Off Strawberry Wall (1974), Helen reaffirmed the work of art as an opening for participants to learn, sense, and even bond with their food sources as precious—and in turn to see themselves as capable of making growth and form choices that benefit society without degrading the earth. These two strawberry works also signaled a turning point in a new politics of knowledge—an affirmative politics—by which Helen and Newton Harrison began combining scientific research on environmental issues like pollution and global warming with self-critical introspection, mixed media technologies, and the live action of performance art to energize the epistemologies and ontologies of academia and civic life.

In 1974 and 1980 respectively, Newton and Helen became tenured professors the Visual Arts Department at UC San Diego.

== The Harrisons' Collaboration: Overview ==
The Harrison's subject matter ranges across a large number of disciplines, yet always has at its core the eco-social well-being of place and community. Whether dealing with the reclamation of watersheds, reforestation, or modest projects in cities and their surrounds, whole systems thinking guides the conceptual processes of their research. They have exhibited broadly and internationally with large-scale installations using diverse media that have critical and propositional thinking in them. They use the exhibition format in several ways, often in the sense of a town meeting, always with the intention of seeing their proposals moving off the walls, landing in planning processes, and ultimately resulting in interventions towards social and environmental justice.

The Harrison Studio locates their work within the domains of both art and science. By operating in the domain of art, the Harrisons teach the ecological dimensions of the human condition better than they could were they working in the domain of science. By doing art with ecological content, the Studio implies that the human species should treat the planet as a sculpture. While it was not evident at the time, in hindsight the Harrisons' work falls naturally into 5 main phases. These phases follow a natural progression as they evolve and grow in scale and loosely align with different decades over their nearly 50-year artistic collaboration. These phases are the Prophetic, the Urban, the Bioregional, the Global, and finally the Force Majeure, which is focused on understanding how all life, not just humanity, will survive when faced with climate change far into the future as entropy inevitably increases.

Most of the Harrisons’ work is in poetry is written in a kind of prose poetry their reason for using the poetic form is how poetry permits the condensation of information. Moreover, poetry does not carry with it the bureaucratic discord so common in most project proposals. Rather, they focus on creating new guiding metaphors and narratives for places as small as a street corner in Santa Monica or as large as all of Eurasia. Harrison Studio works were mainly done by invitation and commission.

== The Harrisons' Collaboration: 1970s ==
The Harrisons began their active collaboration in 1970. This decade may be remembered as the "Years of Prophecy." Helen resigned her University position, acted as research assistant and performance designer and Newton authored and built the work in 7 "Survival Pieces." The imagery and topics covered Making Earth, Hog Pasture, Portable Orchard, Full Farm, Portable Fish Farm, Brine Shrimp farm, and Crab Farm. The images show that Full Farm contained other elements, such as a potato patch and a worm farm. The Harrisons claimed that their intention was to prove the value of urban farming, and in so doing create a balanced diet. They intended each installation in the series to contribute to the design of a productive and sustainable food system. The work heralded future histories of BioArt and debates over the ethics, ontologies, and effects of non-human or posthuman life. The Harrisons worked with living entities as art mediums, and adopted biofunctions like waste, procreating, growing, evolving, dying, and decaying as art processes. These works have been recreated in numerous locations throughout the world, such as Toulouse in 1998, London, in 2009 at Barbican, and the Walker Museum of Art in Minneapolis in 2016, and Los Angeles in 2017, among others, and prophesied the urban farming work of the late 1990s.

These works were followed by another prophetic work, this time a proposal for polycultural fish farming along the Salton Sea in 1974 and 1975. In 1976, the Harrisons did a very complex analysis of irrigated farming and the then much touted green revolution. In this work, entitled “The Meditations on the Sacramento River, the Delta and the Bays of San Francisco.” The last two poetic stanzas argue that the resources used to make irrigated farming ruined rivers, the ecology of the Central Valley of California, even the forests of the Sierra Nevada, raising the entropy of a whole bioregion.

This collaboration originally took place in the San Francisco Museum of Contemporary Art as an exhibition of a variety of mediums, including murals, graffiti, and performance. Statements in chalk on streets around the area, billboards displaying the single word water, and various posters questioning the necessity of irrigation were all a part of this exhibition. Displayed inside were repeating images of a satellite's view of California that focused on varying landmarks, such as topography, borders, and bodies of water, surrounded by written meditations and critique of the irrigation practices and their impact on the environment and biodiversity. This collaboration also included performances of readings, advice to the water personnel, and a Water Board meeting videotaped. This collaboration effectively conveyed the issues and contradictions in the heavy irrigation occurring in these areas to viewers of all different levels of prior knowledge and understanding.

The Harrisons claim this as the second full-scale critique of irrigated farming. The first less aggressive critique came several years earlier in a Ralph Nader publication.

From 1975 to 1977, some of the Harrisons’ most political actions were their criticism of the way the Law of the Sea Conference was exploiting the ocean for the 76 Venice Biennale. In 1975-76 they also did a work entitled, “Meditations on the Great Lakes of North America.” This was their first full-scale bioregional proposal, where they proposed this at the request of Center for 20th Century Studies at the University of Wisconsin. Bioregional work, which pulled back to focus on larger areas, would become more and more prevalent in their work in the future.

They made a simple proposal that suggested reuniting the Great Lakes and forming a giant watershed based on the dictates of the ecology. The third meditation they did in this period was entitled “Meditations on the Gabrieliño Indians” whose original tribal name was no longer remembered, but who farmed with fire and fought wars with song. This work is critical for understanding the process of ecocide and genocide that co-applied to the Spanish priest's treatment of these ecologically savvy first peoples. This could be considered the Harrisons’ first full-scale social justice work.

All of the works detailed above were prophetic in that they made concrete predictions about the future and the long-term outcome of environmental destruction. At the time this was not obvious, but as more and more of their predictions began to come true, the prophetic nature of these works became evident. The last prophetic work that the Harrison's did is the final text in their Lagoon Cycle, a poem that envisions the world Ocean rising and mass migration to cooler regions. Finally, ending with their plea:

And most life
Known and unknown
Named and unnamed
Will have to go elsewhere than now
As vast parts of the eastern seaboard
Of North America
And parts of Europe
Near the North Sea
And South America near the Amazon
And China in the east
And Russia in the north
India in the northeast
And other bits of Asia Africa
Polynesia Melanesia
Australia and even Japan
Will join the growing sea

And in this new beginning
In this continuously rebeginning
Will you feed me
When my lands can no longer produce
And I will house you
When your lands are covered with water
And together
We will withdraw
As the waters rise

== The Harrisons' Collaboration: 1980s ==
This decade was an enormously productive period in the Harrisons' lives as they continued to produce the massive work entitled “The Lagoon Cycle.” In this work, written mostly in a form of prose poetry, we see what amounts to be a 350-foot-long mural in 60 parts in 7 sections. It was acquired by the Pompidou Center in 1998 and is often cited in the literature. For more than 25 years they have been experimenting with biodynamic, water related artworks. In The Lagoon Cycle, the Harrisons attempt to synthesize biology, history, economics, mythology, geography, aquaculture and geology to generate a new paradigm for thinking about global realities-with water rather than land as the basis for evaluating ideas. This shift in emphasis from land to water is symbolized by the difference between the first map in The Lagoon Cycle-which shows the land mass of North America in the center of the globe-and the final map, which has at its the center not land, but water, the Pacific Ocean.

During the 1980s the Harrisons gradually shifted their focus towards urban ecologies. They had begun their career with an often-cited self-limitation. That is to say, they pledged to no work that did not benefit the ecosystem for the remainder of their lives. This decision resonated with the development of conceptual art, where a single decision could determine a body, or even a lifetime of work. They were forced into urban considerations, as the funding that permitted them to do large scale generalist works like the meditations and The Lagoon Cycle faded, and during this period funding for work came largely from urban institutions.

For instance, In Baltimore Promenade, the Harrisons were asked how they would respond to faulty city planning by the director of the Maryland Institute, Fred Lazarus. Baltimore Promenade was an astonishingly effective work. The Harrisons argued that the promenade system of the city had been massively undermined by the wrong kinds of development, housing people in large buildings that were like storage systems. This work was unique from a number of perspectives.

Firstly, 5 8’ square aerial photos were the core of this work, where everybody could see their house, and everybody could see where the promenade would take place. A second remarkable property was that the mayor and city council supported this work, and when the Harrisons proposed a citywide promenade, the mayor lead it through the city in a horse and carriage with such success that the urban planning group immediately put 15 Million dollars down to recreate a section of the promenade called the cultural corridor. Another remarkable property was that the promenade lead from different sections of the city towards the new construction at Harborplace.

Another very surprising urban work happened in the piece entitled “Fortress Atlanta,” commissioned by Emory University Gallery with Dr. Clark Poling as the director. In it, the Harrisons found that the center of the city of Atlanta had redeveloped itself into very large buildings with single entries, uninviting, and with all parking lots surrounded with barbed wire. After careful study, the Harrisons proposed that the city has redesigned itself in opposition to the second amendment of our constitution, which legalizes public meetings, and they held that Atlanta had redesigned so that the public could not assemble in its center. In quick succession is a work called Barrier Island Drama, invited by the John and Mable Ringling Museum of Art, in which the Harrisons take on the destruction of the mangrove swamps and raising awareness for this throughout the region.

By 1985, they showed "Barrier Island Drama" at the São Paulo Biennale, and, a few months later, showed restoration work for the city of Pasadena. Two years later, they are invited by the Santa Monica Mountain Conservancy to make a second proposal for Devil's Gate Dam in Pasadena. A remarkable thing happened. The Gabrieleño princess saw their drawings for the Devil's Gate Basin and argued that the Harrisons had called for the restoration of a sacred place they called “The Place of the Laughing Waters.” In honor of this, they renamed the Devil's Gate Basin the “Hahamongna Watershed Park.” Needless to say, the Harrisons were honored.

In 1987 also, invited to documenta 8, they did a body of work for the improvement of the environment of the city of Kassel, and this was critical of the rebuilding of the city after World War 2. The Harrisons objected to rebuilding the city according to Hitler's original plans. Another remarkable outcome happened. The German president Von Weizsacker passing through documenta, liked the Harrison's work so much that he asked them to go the city Berlin and work there. To that end they were given a DAAD Award.

In Berlin, where the Harrisons spent 2 six-month periods beginning in 1988, they did two works. The first, an urban work entitled “Trummerflora: on the Topograpy of Terror," took issue with the industrialized murder system of the German Government in its concentration camps. They counter-proposed a work that was a memorial, but not a monument. Evidently, this work was considered by the German Parliament, but was turned down by the head of the Jewish community, as that leader said the site was terrible and used so terribly he wished it to disappear and be totally developed into housing and forgotten. The Harrison's disagreed to no avail. In 2003, Eisenman's Memorial to the Murdered Jews of Europe was created in this area instead. The second work, "Atempause für den Fluss Sava," done in 1989, is another early example of the Harrisons' bioregional investigations, this time on the Sava River and surrounding regions. Ultimately these plans were approved by the Croatian officials, but they were never carried out because of conflict and instability caused by Slobodan Milošević. These bioregional works would evolve and increase in scale throughout the 1990s.

== The Harrisons' Collaboration: 1990s ==
At the beginning of the 1990s, the Harrisons continued developing their practical bioregional works. This included the aforementioned "Serpentine Lattice," which made cogent arguments for the restoration of the North American fog forests. It was an installation that measured 10’x36′, and consisted of a dissolving slide mural of the disappearing North American Pacific Coast Temperate Rain Forest. The installation also included a 12’x36′ hand drawn map, text and forest image photo panels.

At the time, 95% of the old forest growth had been harvested, and the cutting of the trees had left around 75 thousand miles of disturbed river and stream. The Studio created a design that would require controlling the high ground from the San Francisco Bay to Yakutat Bay in Alaska. This would create a scaffolding for the sustainable reclaiming of the Pacific Northwest Temperate Coastal Rain Forest. The main idea was to generate an eco-friendly security system, not too different from the social security system, and to use 1% of the Gross National Product to try and fight against the seemingly endless destruction of the environment. Included in this installation was a piece of writing to better explain their ideas and reasoning. This project took place at Reed College in Portland, Oregon. Susan Fillin-Yeh supported the Harrisons in this endeavor. Douglas F. Cooley, from the Memorial Art Gallery of the college, commissioned the project. Serpentine Lattice is now in the permanent collection of the San Jose Museum of Art.

This particularly complex work ended up proposing that the restoration be made in such a way that human occupation would operate as a figure in an ecologically diverse field. In her PHD dissertation, Reiko Goto explains that the use of a "metaphor flip" in this work as an example of conceptual art that contains a much more powerful environmental message.

The Harrisons argue in their concluding poem that the US should develop an eco-security system funded by a percentage of the tax base that was similar in intention and process to the way the social security system now operates.

However
if as a form of recycling
we take one percent
of our gross national product
and establish an eco-security system
not unlike
our social security system
then
roughly 57 billion dollars
become available yearly
for restoration/reclamation

Finally
ground would be reversed
so that the ecosystem
becomes the field
and human use
the figure within it

Then
the gross national ecosystem
would take its place
privileged appropriately
as the field within which
the political systems
social systems
and business systems that constitute
our eco-cultural entity can exist

In 1993, Helen and Newton recruited their youngest son Gabriel Harrison, an architect, and his wife, designer Vera Westergaard to join them in formally establishing the Harrison Studio in La Jolla. This period especially emphasized the interweaving of urban and bioregional work. The Harrisons allowed urban work to unpack itself and become bioregional in its final operations. For instance, in "The Green Heart of Holland," a request came from the Netherlands’ cultural council to save the Groene Hart which had been damaged by pollution and threatened with unchecked urban development. This is an 800 square kilometer area in the center of the Netherlands. The Harrisons’ proposal was biological in structure and bioregional by implication.

For instance, their 160-mile-long biodiversity ring is tuned to mini-succession ecosystems happening throughout the Green Heart. If pursued aggressively enough, as farming receded in that region and the life web increased, its number of mini-succession ecologies, the whole Green Heart region could then develop into a unique bioregional area. The Green Heart work ultimately received the Groeneveld prize for doing the most for the country of Holland that year in 2002.

This strategy that the Harrison's developed to reconnect the urban world to the bioregion it operates in is also reflected profoundly in the 1995-96 work the Endangered Meadows of Europe. Like Holland, which began with a request that development be stopped from dominating the Green Heart, which the Harrisons’ work succeeded in doing, the endangered meadows also begin with a city, this time city of Bonn. Its physical form was an acre and a half rooftop on the top of the largest in museum in Germany, which was Helmut Kohl's museum. The work was enormously popular. A quarter of a million people came. Angela Merkel, then environmental minister of Germany, wrote the opening speech.

However, the intention of the artists was to restore, in its original condition, the meadowlands of Europe. If the meadowlands were restored an important part of the web of life in the sub-continent would come back, as the meadows were composed of a multitude of plant species, many endangered. Terrestrial wildlife, birds, and insects took advantage of the meadows as well. The biodiversity returns to the city and the argument is made for it to return to the countryside. Ultimately, the Harrison's proposed that the historic transformation of forest into meadow also set up the conditions for rich interconnected biodiverse life web to develop.

The "Brown Coal Park for Leipzig" reinterpreted this work for a region that had already been greatly damaged by pollution. It proposed the regeneration of the vast excavations made to harvest brown coal which had been a source of Germany and Europe's electricity for many decades. By the early 1990s, this area was largely and abandoned. The excavations began to fill with water that was toxic. At the same time, there were very large areas of turned earth. The Harrisons realized that the turned earth had almost the same conditions as the ground left behind glaciers retreated. The Harrisons saw this as an opportunity for a large, novel ecosystem to be developed, partially lakes and what would grow in the turned earth. The unusual part of this proposal was that it argued for the life web to create a specialized, local ecosystem that, over time, would niche itself into the larger bioregion during its regeneration.

Another project, "A Perimeter Walk for Frankfurt," came from a request by the architects of Hessen. Five teams were asked what they would do to work out the population reduction problems and the social problems of the city of Frankfurt. The Harrisons refused this by redefining the problem. They discovered several thousand acres of farmland on the city border and proposed a new amenity that would benefit the whole city and massively benefit the future of the larger environment. They proposed diverting waters from the Main River that would be pumped into purification ponds and then rejoin the river on the west side of the city. In concert with this new stream, they invented a perimeter walk alongside the farmland and forests, dotted by 9 greenhouses about a kilometer apart.

Each greenhouse had in it what research indicated would live in this environment once the temperature had risen, in this case 3 to 5 degrees. The various greenhouses’ contents were forest, forest understory, grasslands, farmlands and meadowlands, sometimes in combination. These greenhouses and forward-thinking ideas would eventually be revisited in the "Future Gardens" many years later. This work so impressed the leadership of Frankfurt that its museum exhibition was presented as Frankfurt's main contribution to taking in the Olympic Games.

After returning to California, one of their most unique works began when the Harrisons won a competition to conceptualize a way to connect the city of Santa Monica to the promenade that operated near the Santa Monica Pier. The Harrisons invented a work entitled "California Wash." They developed a serpentine walk down from Pico Boulevard to the promenade that ran between Santa Monica and Venice Beach. The Harrisons discovered that beneath the promenade there was an outfall that released unfiltered street runoff straight into the ocean.

Their design called for covering the outfall in such a way that new space was created and a new work called "Wave Fence" stopped people from falling in. This work created an entirely new narrative for this part of the city. Part of the funding came from a hotel called Shutters on the Beach. This work is emblematic of the problems doing unconventional art-generated public work. The hotel objected to the ecology and wanted to plant non-native flowers as their garden. The city wanted to redesign the serpentine path because of concerns that skateboarders would cause accidents. The flood control district stopped work on this piece because they wanted the outfall cover to be strong enough to handle large trucks with heavy payloads. The strength per square foot had to be upgraded massively. Hundreds of yards of concrete and striations, planting, running all the way to Pico Boulevard had already been completed when the work stalled.

This whole process dragged on for nearly 6 years and the work remained unfinished. The Harrisons discovered that there was a law stating that if the city mishandled a work of public art, the artists could ask for its return. They evidently contacted the city and requested this be work returned. It appears that this request informally energized all involved and the work was completed within 3 months.

In 1998 the Harrisons were invited by the Tate Liverpool and the Henry Moore Foundation to make proposals for middle England as part of an exhibition entitled Artranspennine 98.

In this work, the Harrisons took the title literally, and began an exploration of the Pennines mountains between Liverpool and Kingston upon Hull. They discovered, working with their colleague David Haley, that there are Roman roads that define this region, both above and below. The title came from Helen Harrison who imagined herself several miles tall, casting a green net over the region which lands on the 2 Roman roads, and the 2 giant public parks on either side. In the large maps that they constructed, this outline has the look of a giant gecko in dragon form, and the title then emerged, "Casting a Green Net, Can It Be We Are Seeing a Green Dragon?"

This piece has about it a comprehensiveness and maturity that the earlier bioregional works lack, as it takes up farming, herding, population control, and housing control. On top of this, the Harrisons finally argue that if controls are not made of this kind, the ecology of the region is lost, as are 35 villages. The reverse being true if their work is enacted.

The 1990s end with a work requested of the Harrisons by the leadership of the Hanover Expo 2000 World's Fair. This work was not a work of art, but a book, entitled The World as Garden or Grune Landschaften was meant to have environmentalism as its core subject matter. When a Belgian banker took over leadership and eliminated all environmental concerns, even commissioning McDonalds to be the example of what a healthy diet is, the former leadership commissioned 10 books to be written about the environment of Europe. It turned out that after careful study, it was understood that the Harrison book was the only one that had a direct proposal, and so the Harrisons were asked what they wished to do with their proposal by the original commissioners.

In it the book, the Harrisons make a proposal in the form of a question. Can the European Union, which really covers most of the European subcontinent up to Poland, actually begin to behave like a living organism? Perhaps a micro-organism like a paramecium, and that through autopoetic processes, where intelligence is indicated because a species knows what's good for itself and seeks it, and knows what's bad for itself and avoids it? Therefore, intelligence is manifested in lifeforms in absence of a central nervous system. In this book, the Harrisons ask, can the whole peninsula of Europe behave this way, with its governance determining what's good and bad? The question is never sufficiently answered. This lead directly to their first major work of the 21st century.

== The Harrisons' Collaboration: 2000s ==
In the early 2000s the Harrisons evolved their works up to continental scales, continuing the trend established in the 1990s. Asked how they would proceed with the ideas put forth in Grune Landshaften, the Harrisons decided to create an exhibition entitled, “Peninsula Europe.” This exhibition proposed regenerating the forest ecosystems that ran across the peninsula of Europe from the Carpathians across the massif central plain in France, still further across the Pyrenees through to Portugal. Basically, they argued through many, many maps, stories, maps and floor pieces that if these lands were saved and preserved, the top end of every watershed would be regenerated, saving both the ecosystem of the subcontinent and its water systems simultaneously. So, "Peninsula Europe, the High Grounds," done in 2001, was shown in a variety of museums in 3 different countries with catalogues in 4 languages, was completed, showing by 2005. The Harrisons would return to this work with updates and new information several times over the next decade.

By 2003, the Harrisons had also become engaged in a work called “Santa Fe Watershed, Lessons from the Genius of Place.” This was their final large watershed piece. The originality in this work can be seen in the Harrisons effort to restore the ecology of the arroyos to increase the waters flowing into the Santa Fe River. This river used to flow free and fully into the Rio Grande, but was now often dry as a consequence of relentless overdraft. The concept of this work was evidently put into the city plan but never enacted. The most unique part of this work is the Harrison studio collaboration with Rina Swentzell, Tewa wisewoman and students from the Indian school. After all, it was their land originally, and the Harrisons vigorously acknowledged this and learned from it.

The Harrison Studio relocated from La Jolla to Santa Cruz in 2004. The Harrisons took on new roles as emeritus professors at University of California Santa Cruz during this time. By 2005, after completing the Santa Fe work and doing their last presentation of Peninsula Europe, they began their next bioregional work entitled "Greenhouse Britain." It is the most complex and comprehensive global warming work that the Harrison team had ever attempted. The most powerful element in this work is a model of the island of Britain 8’x30’ with projections above the model that showed water rise around the island with storm surges. The Harrisons' intention was to democratize global warming information in such a way that those living and working close to the water could themselves take control of the planning of their own future. Ultimately this work won the CIWEM prize for doing the most to alert the citizenry of the island of Britain to raise awareness of how global warming was going to effect their lives in the near future.

The Harrisons work often has a very complex backstory, sometimes developing over long periods of time. For instance, "Tibet is the High Ground," commissioned and first shown in 1993, has a convoluted history. Originally, the work was conceived in answer to the Dalai Lama's personal request that they help him design a Peace Park on the Tibetan Plateau. The Harrisons research discovered that the 7 rivers flowing from the Tibetan that nourish much of China and Asia are endangered, back in the 1990s, by aggressive over-foresting. Instead, the Harrisons invented an entirely new work that does not address the Peace Park, but rather proposes a transnational group be formed to save these rivers. The outcome was inconclusive.

In 2006 the Harrisons were contacted by The Missing Peace, who asked that they revisit the work for a new exhibit on the Dalai Lama. After complex negotiation, the Harrisons did a new Tibet work that is manifested in three images. The work proposes that civil society will have to change considerably as the 7 great rivers flowing from the Tibetan Plateau become intermittent in their flow. The reasons for this, now well documented, are glacial melt. This is because glaciers growing and shrinking used to consistently supply water to these rivers, but now the rivers will become much more erratic in their flow since rainwater is much less predictable than slow and constant glacial melt.

The three Tibet works they proposed look to ways for the whole Tibetan plateau to go green and to change the nature of its water use. Resurrecting the spirit of the prophetic phase from their early work, the concepts explored in Tibet's highland represented a new way to look at climate change. It asked the question, how could the life web adapt to survive since humanity is seemingly unable, or unwilling, to reverse the damage? The notions of pragmatic forward thinking and adaptation strategies would heavily inform the next major stage of their work. From 2007 on, the Harrisons introduced this new global theme as a term borrowed from the legal world, The Force Majeure.

"Force majeure translates literally from French as superior force. In English, the term is often used in line with its literal French meaning, but it has other uses as well, including one that has roots in a principle of French law. In business circles, "force majeure" describes those uncontrollable events (such as war, labor stoppages, or extreme weather) that are not the fault of any party and that make it difficult or impossible to carry out normal business."

The Harrisons propose that we as a human race have invented our own version of this concept. They define the Force Majeure as the transaction between the rising of waters that affect all land areas touched by the sea, the 6th extinction, which affects all living creatures, and the heat wave, which touches every surface on the planet. They see these three forces as collaborating to create a Force Majeure. They consider their most recent work as seeking to discover counter forces at that scale. About 10 years later, this name would be used to found the Harrisons' non-profit organization The Center for the Study of the Force Majeure.

== The Harrisons' Collaboration: 2010s ==
While the Harrisons were working at global scales during this period, they also began to pursue a new series of works called "Future Gardens." The Future Garden set out to answer a very simple question: given the extreme heat wave and its implications, can we grow, in the now, what will live in the future? The idea is that as an ecosystem, or at least most species in it, fade back in a future heatwave, can we be growing the replacement in the now in greenhouses so that ecosystem regeneration can be aided and even accelerated? The originality here was assisting the migration of species through time. The Harrisons found it interesting to work at the greatest scale and the smallest scale simultaneously. "Future Gardens" are designed to be easily reproduced and reconstructed in different environments around the world, much like the "Survival Pieces". Ultimately, future gardens set out to democratize botanical information and any small group with knowledgeable botanical assistance can set about growing its own future.

It could be argued that early prototypes of Future Gardens first appeared in the 1990s as sketches of greenhouses in Frankfurt or as an outcome of the Endangered Meadows of Europe installation in Bonn, which both explored similar themes. The first Future Garden constructed on the ground was entitled “Sagehen: A Proving Ground” This work specifically asked the question what will grow best on the ground plain after fires clear the ground in the High Sierras. The research was done by the research director of the Santa Cruz arboretum where 21 species were selected for their ability to survive heat and drought. 12,500 plantings were made, grown in the arboretum, and then replanted after 8 weeks growth in the High Sierra Berkeley University research station called Sagehen. 3 sites were chosen for each of 5 altitudes, 500 to 600 feet apart and above each other. Survival rates are still being studied.

The second Future Garden is entitled a “Future Garden for the Central Coast of California.” Working on the same principles, 20 odd species again were chosen and propagated in 3-dome greenhouses. The temperature in these greenhouses was kept a constant 5 degrees warmer than normal, and each one had a different water schedule since humidity was unpredictable. A complex very rich scientific experiment that creates a new restorative narrative for a region soon to be under heat stress. The first 10 years of research were funded by the Warhol Foundation. The initial structure of the first 2 Future Gardens were funded by metabolic studio.

The third Future Garden, still being developed, is entitled a "Future Garden for Central Europe." It has been funded as part of the 2026 Cultural City of Europe IEEU in Trenčín.

Beginning in 2015, with Helen beginning to withdraw due to dementia, Newton invented a body of work that dealt with a concept called “preemptive planning." When asked by an exhibition group what they would do for the bays of San Francisco, and proposed planning for an ocean rise of several meters. These waters would rise up in the bay and flow back into the Central Valley, ultimately making as much as a 500,000 acre estuarial lagoon. This is based on the theory that, in earlier periods such as the Eemian, the Central Valley was an inland sea. This produced some very startling aerial images.

In 2016, The Harrison Studio published The Time of the Force Majeure: After 45 Years Counterforce is on the Horizon. This book is an exhaustive and definitive survey of the Harrisons' work together and visions for the future.

In 2018, The Center for the Study of the Force Majeure was founded by Newton Harrison at UC Santa Cruz, and operates on the principle that "We as a species must adapt ourselves to a very different world...proceed[ing] on our assertion that ecologically based, large-scale systems of adaptation to the extreme changes in the ever-warming environment are necessary for collective survival and so must be invented. Seen metaphorically, two frontiers are emergent and evolving exponentially: One is a wave front of water, advancing on the edges of all continents that touch the oceans; the other is a heat wave that is increasingly (apparently slowly, but in fact exponentially) and covering, touching, and affecting the whole planet and the lives on it. These are different from all other frontiers that have been part of human experience, frontiers that we have advanced toward, most often by conquering or exploiting to our own advantage. These new frontiers move toward us, and our habitual responses of exploiting resources for production, consumption, and profit are no longer meaningful behaviors. Rather, we must adapt ourselves to meet these two frontiers on the scale on which they operate."

== Helen Harrisons' death and later works ==
Helen Harrison began to show early signs of dementia in 2012. She gradually removed herself from the work during the following years. She died in 2018. After serving as her main caregiver while keeping the work on track, Newton still continues on to honor her legacy. Newton asked his son Josh Harrison to join their efforts around this time. They became co-directors of the Center for the Study of the Force Majeure later that year. This center, also a non-profit, is funded by the arts division of UCSC, among others.

Another work that focused on preemptive planning, exhibited around the world in 2018, is entitled "The Deep Wealth of This Nation Scotland." An elaborate set of image-based recommendations were made that would assist the nation of Scotland to move through a 5 or 6 °C heatwave with an ecologically based, abundant future. The first full-scale installation of this work happened at the Taipei Biennal in 2018.

These themes are explored further in "Helen's Town," a memorial, imagined as a city-sized urban development project with roots in ecological sustainability and pragmatic forward thinking. This was proposed in response to a request by MOSSUTSTÄLLNINGAR in Sweden. The work has a complex history and was most recently published in the 2021 Liverpool Biennale catalog as a book chapter. Helen's Town actually proposes a 20,000 person community and answers the question, how will this community live in abundance when so many species have already died? A fundamental part of the proposal is to choose a region that is cold today, but will be warm enough and habitable to humans and other wildlife after the global temperature rises, evoking a kind of rustic futurism. While it is truly massive in scope, research is underway to make this vision a reality. Other locations being considered besides Sweden are Maine, England, the Tibetan Plateau, or even Siberia.

Harrison was also recently asked to do a work on the DMZ on the border between North and South Korea. The proposal ultimately determines that the DMZ in its present state has become the richest nature reserve in the whole region. Harrison's proposal argues to expand the DMZ from a 160 mile corridor 2 miles wide to include associated uninhabited mountainous regions.

Harrison is currently working with the Getty Research Institute on a 5 venue California retrospective of the Harrison's work, beginning with the "Survival Pieces" some 50 years earlier, ultimately completing a full survey of the Harrison's half-century career in the world of ecological art. It will open to the public as part of Pacific Standard Time in 2024. The exhibition curator is Tatiana Sizonenko.

In 2023, artist and curator Janeil Engelstad produced a special section of Leonardo (MIT Press) titled “Disremembering the Harrisons,” where Engelstad authored an essay and invited artists and writers from around the world to contribute pieces on the international impact of Helen and Newton's work and thinking in art and science.

== Sensorium ==
Newton Harrison's most critical current work is entitled “A Sensorium for the World Ocean.” This work proposes a complex immersive environment with the world Ocean personified by an AI generated voice. There would be a map of the world ocean on the floor and scientific information on the walls surrounding the audience. The concept in it is complex, performative and immersive. Harrison proposes that desire-driven problem solving is determined in part by the desire of charitable organizations cannot possibly succeed in saving the world from self-simplifying due to exploitation stresses it now faces.

The list of proposed topics includes acidity, core samples, dead zones, nurseries, wetlands among many others. The initial presentation sets out to give the Ocean a voice and it turns out that no part of our whole world Ocean is undamaged. Much other life is at stake if the world ocean simplifies itself and becomes minimally productive. The solutions that Harrison produces are art based, perceptual, and quite startling. The prototype for Sensorium is currently being developed in collaboration with JoAnn Kuchera-Morin, creator of the Allosphere at UCSB.

== Representation ==
The Harrisons are represented by Various Small Fires in Los Angeles, California and Ronald Feldman Gallery in New York City, New York.
