= Fernanda Lavera =

Argentinian neo-expressionist artist

Fernanda Lavera (born 1975, Buenos Aires, Argentina) is a neo-expressionist and figurative artist. Her work has been influenced by the street art scene and the Buenos Aires art community. Lavera gained international attention after music producer and art collector Clive Davis discovered her paintings during an exhibition at the Palacio Duhau in Buenos Aires.

== Influences/Styles ==
Lavera states that she was influenced by Antonio Berni, an Argentinian artist from the 1960s, who experimented with neo-figuration to speak about pressing social matters of the time.

Lavera credits a family acquaintance with introducing her to art, providing her with brushes, canvases, and encouragement at a time that was important for her artistic development. Lavera has also spoken about being inspired by CoBra, a group of German artists who created neo-expressionist art after the fall of the Berlin wall. Lavera also stated that she takes inspiration from Basquiat, Picasso, and Paul Gauguin. Speaking about the inspiration of Basquiat, Lavera commented "The directness and primitivism of Basquiat echoes in me, as I tell histories of my beloved city with graffiti that speaks in a narrative context.”

=== Issues ===
Lavera's abstract style touches upon social issues, particularly the mistreatment of women and gender violence.

=== Technique ===
Lavera describes herself as a Neo-Expressionist. Her paintings occur primarily on large canvases. She often paints several works simultaneously. This allows for a consistent message to appear among works that are made during the same period.

== Exhibitions & Displays ==
=== I'm not a Robot ===
The solo exhibition I'm not a Robot took place in April 2024 at Andaz West Hollywood in Los Angeles, California. The exhibition was a reflection to not go so fast in a society filled with automatic consumption: "I’m not a robot - why must I prove my humanity when I am unquestionably human and an artist?" Fernanda asserts her identity as an artist, not a machine.

=== Lettera a Siracusa ===
The solo exhibition Lettera a Siracusa (Letters to Siracusa) took place in September 2023 at Ortea Palace Hotel Sicily-Autograph Collection. Captivated by the symbols and traditions surrounding the history of the island, so culturally rich, Lettera a Siracusa is a love letter that Lavera leaves to Syracuse before her departure. A tribute that offers a journey through some mythological stories that took place in the Sicilian territory. Drawing from this corpus of mythology, history, and literature, Fernanda explores some historical symbols that still persist and travel through time with us. These narratives evolve depending on who tells them and always manage to adapt, persisting and becoming symbols of history and cultural roots.

=== Cheap Chat ===
The solo exhibition, Cheap Chat took place in July 2022 at the G23NY gallery in New York. The exhibition was a reflection on the Russian invasion of Ukraine. Lavera said that the exhibition critiqued how "people who talk about the war yet do nothing about it".

=== The Inventive Mind of Fernanda Lavera ===
The Inventive Mind of Fernanda Lavera was a solo exhibition held in March 2022 at Manolis Projects, in Miami. Art critic Bruce Helander wrote in Elevated Magazines: "Her winter exhibition at Manolis Projects promises to deliver an intelligent and compelling argument that Fernanda Lavera’s star is shining brightly, polished with sophistication and highlighted with street smart wit and cleverness. The selected works on view in this beautifully curated exhibition are packed with creative energy, unconventionality and imaginative intellectual twists and turns. As a dedicated painter with an ingeniously coded abstract visual message Fernanda carries a distinguished badge of courage and responsibility as a communicator for social justice as well following an honored tradition of artists who know that “every picture tells a story.”

=== The Pharaoh and the Celtic Gods ===
The solo exhibition The Pharaoh and the Celtic Gods took place in November 2021, in New York City at Gallery 23. It featured works she created during 2020 and 2021 and also saw the launch of the Sr. Freeck Sneaker collection.

=== Lucy & Mr. Freak ===
Lucy & Mr. Freak was a solo exhibition held in April 2021 at Manolis Projects in Miami, Florida.

=== One Thousand Museum ===
The artworks "Mind of Man" and "Dance with the Devil" decorate the apartment of footballer David Beckham at the One Thousand Museum in Miami, a building designed by Zaha Hadid.

== Reception ==
Record producer and art collector Clive Davis encountered Lavera's work during a visit to Buenos Aires in 2016 when he came across Lavera's work during an exhibition that took place at Palacio Duhau, stating "I immediately felt her enormous talent… a second-generation neo-expressionist with a very special feminine twist, Lavera is the real deal. I love her art and the stories behind her art."

Artist and art critic Bruce Helander stated that "it is impossible not to appreciate the artist’s exceptional style that is propelling this talented artist into a genuine art world contender." He described Lavera as having "an ingeniously coded abstract visual message Fernanda carries a distinguished badge of courage and responsibility as a communicator for social justice as well as following an honored tradition of artists who know that “every picture tells a story." Helander also acknowledged Lavera as having "a distinctive style that combines her colorful Argentinian background, with its vivid influences and rhythmic sensibility, into a strong idiosyncratic neo-expressionist statement with a complex pictorial language that paraphrases juxtapositions of harmony and aesthetic principles of multiplicity."
