= Robert Mars =

American contemporary artist

- Born: 19 December 1978 (age 47); New Jersey
- Movement: Pop Art, Neo-Expressionism, Neo-pop
- Website: robertmars.com

Robert Mars (born 19 December 1969) is a contemporary American artist known for his Futurelics Popforms celebrating icons of the Golden Era of the 1950s and 1960s.

== Early life and education ==
Even at the age of five of six, Robert Mars was experimenting with collage and pop-based themes that would inspire him throughout his career. He is a graduate of Parsons School of Design, New York City. Before committing to being a full-time artist, Mars started out as a graphic designer in New York City and then design director for fashion brands. After spending most of his life in New York City, Mars lived on the west coast in Los Angeles from 1996 to 2001 and in Portland from 2001 to 2005 before returning to east coast to fiercely pursue fine art.

== Career ==
Mars' artwork is exhibited worldwide including museum collections in Munich, Tokyo, Amsterdam, London, Boston, New York City, Los Angeles, Laguna Beach, Paris, Aspen and Naples. Mars' latest solo exhibition in 2016 was at the Evansville Museum of Arts in Indiana, where he will also be an artist in residence and guest lecturer.

Alongside Damien Hirst, Mars' artwork was selected for the Absolut Vodka Blank campaign. His largest monumental piece to date was acquired by Philip Morris/Altria for their corporate headquarters in Virginia. In 2015, Mars was chosen for the cover of Neiman Marcus' May Book. Also in the same year, Coca-Cola purchased several existing works and ordered commissions for a world tour celebrating their centennial anniversary of their trademark bottle shape in which Mars debuted his Coca-Cola Popforms. Robert Mars artworks are also in the institutional collections of Coral Springs Museum of Art, International Museum of Collage and New Bedford Art Museum, as well as in the corporate collections of Microsoft, adidas, Nike, Inc., Bank of America, Wells Fargo, Oceania Cruises, Prps, and Monopol Hotel Collection in St. Moritz.

== Publications ==
In 2017, Mars attained critical recognition from Donald Kuspit, Bruce Helander, and Eleanor Heartney. DTR Modern Galleries produced a publication of a fresh collection of works by Mars along with essays by those aforementioned scholars in Futurelics: Robert Mars Past is Present.

- Vassilev, Ted (2018). Robert Mars Futurelics: Past is Present. New York, NY: Scala Arts Publishers Inc. ISBN 978-1785511639. Essays by Eleanor Heartney, Bruce Helander and Donald Kuspit.

== Styles and techniques ==
From his studio in Connecticut, Robert Mars archives the nostalgia of idealistic Americana culture. In the styles of Andy Warhol and Robert Rauschenberg, Mars explores the mementos of the past, present, and future packaged in layers of resin. With a background in graphic design, Mars uses Xerox transfers of iconic images of celebrities or tokens as the focal point, and then creates a branded paper ecosystem of archived magazines, newspapers, and advertisements that he photocopies, layers with paint, and cements with resin.

Mars' style evokes a vintage quality, distressed but bold, that hangs on to a fading era. The artworks are homages to an era after the Great Depression and World War II. The era hosted people such as Marilyn Monroe, Elizabeth Taylor, James Dean, Audrey Hepburn, Jackie Kennedy and Elvis Presley that Mars captures in his artworks as ambassadors of better times. More recently, Mars has also included fashion models Kate Moss and Naomi Campbell in his works, as well as Martin Luther King Jr., and tributes to Basquiat. Mars also explores consumerism and branding that is part of the celebrity culture of today. Besides the exploration of collages, Robert Mars has developed unique forms of art from contemporary quilts that merges old-school patterns with pop art to more recently his Futurelic Popforms, a collection of 2D and 3D Americana relics that Mars has updated for the millennials.

== Exhibitions ==
Solo Exhibitions

- June 2016 "The golden age" Mead Carney, Porto Montenegro, Montenegro
- May 2016 "Days were golden" Evansville Museum, Evansville, IN
- September 2015 "Boys are back in town" JoAnne Artman Gallery, Laguna Beach, CA
- October 2014 "A Love supreme" The Harvey B Gantt Center, Charlotte, NC
- September 2014 "Mars Attacks" JoAnne Artman Gallery, Laguna Beach, CA
- May 2014 "A Love supreme" DTR Modern Gallery, New York, NY
- March 2014 "A love affair" DTR Modern Gallery, Georgetown, Washington, DC
- December 2012 "Captivated" Coral Springs Museum of Art, Coral Springs, FL
- April 2012 "Stars and starlets" DTR Modern, New York, NY
- October 2011 "American Idols" Galerie Bartoux, Honfleur, France
- March 2011 "American Art" Museum Gallery of Modern Art, Sofia, Bulgaria
- November 2010 "Lost and found" Gallery Brown, Los Angeles, CA
- March 2010 "Chronicles of America" DTR Modern, Boston, MA
- October 2009 "Ruins and relics" Peter Blake Gallery, Laguna Beach, CA
- September 2009 "Notes from the road" Hubert Gallery, New York, NY
- April 2009 "Diamonds and rust" Art Department Gallery, Atlanta, GA
- July 2008 "Beauty in hindsight" Guestroom Gallery, Portland, OR
- April 2008 "Fading trails" Hubert Gallery, New York, NY
- February 2008 "Viva Lost Vegas" Peter Blake Gallery, Laguna Beach, CA
- March 2007 "Gas, Food, Lodging" Kidder Smith Gallery, Boston, MA

Selected Group Exhibitions

- May 2016 "Effervescence" Coca-Cola Museum, Atlanta, GA
- September 2015 "Mars and Devine" DTR Modern, Boston, MA
- September 2014 "The art of cinema" DTR Modern, Boston, MA
- April 2013 "Ted x PDX" Portland Museum of Art, Portland, OR
- April 2012 "Year of the dragon" Compound Gallery, Portland, OR
- March 2006 BraveArt 06, Vancouver, B.C.
- July 2005 "Commons" Basefield Projects, Melbourne, Australia
- April 2005 24Fifty Gallery, San Francisco, CA
- February 2004 Modart, Munich, Germany
- September 2003 "From the ground up" New Bedford Art Museum, New Bedford, MA August
- 2003 "What is Compound" Rocket Gallery, Tokyo, Japan
- July 2003 "Into the void" Compound Gallery, Portland, OR
- February 2003 Modart, Munich, Germany
