= Zhejiang California International NanoSystems Institute =

Zhejiang California International NanoSystems Institute (Traditional Chinese: 浙江加州國際納米研究院, Simplified Chinese: 浙江加州国际纳米研究院; abbr. ZCINI), is an institute affiliated with the Zhejiang University with a research focus on nanoscience and nanotechnology. It was established in June 2005 and formed from a collaboration between the Zhejiang Provincial Government, Zhejiang University, and the California Nanosystems Institute (CNSI) at UCLA.
