= Norman Ives =

American artist and graphic designer

Norman Seaton Ives
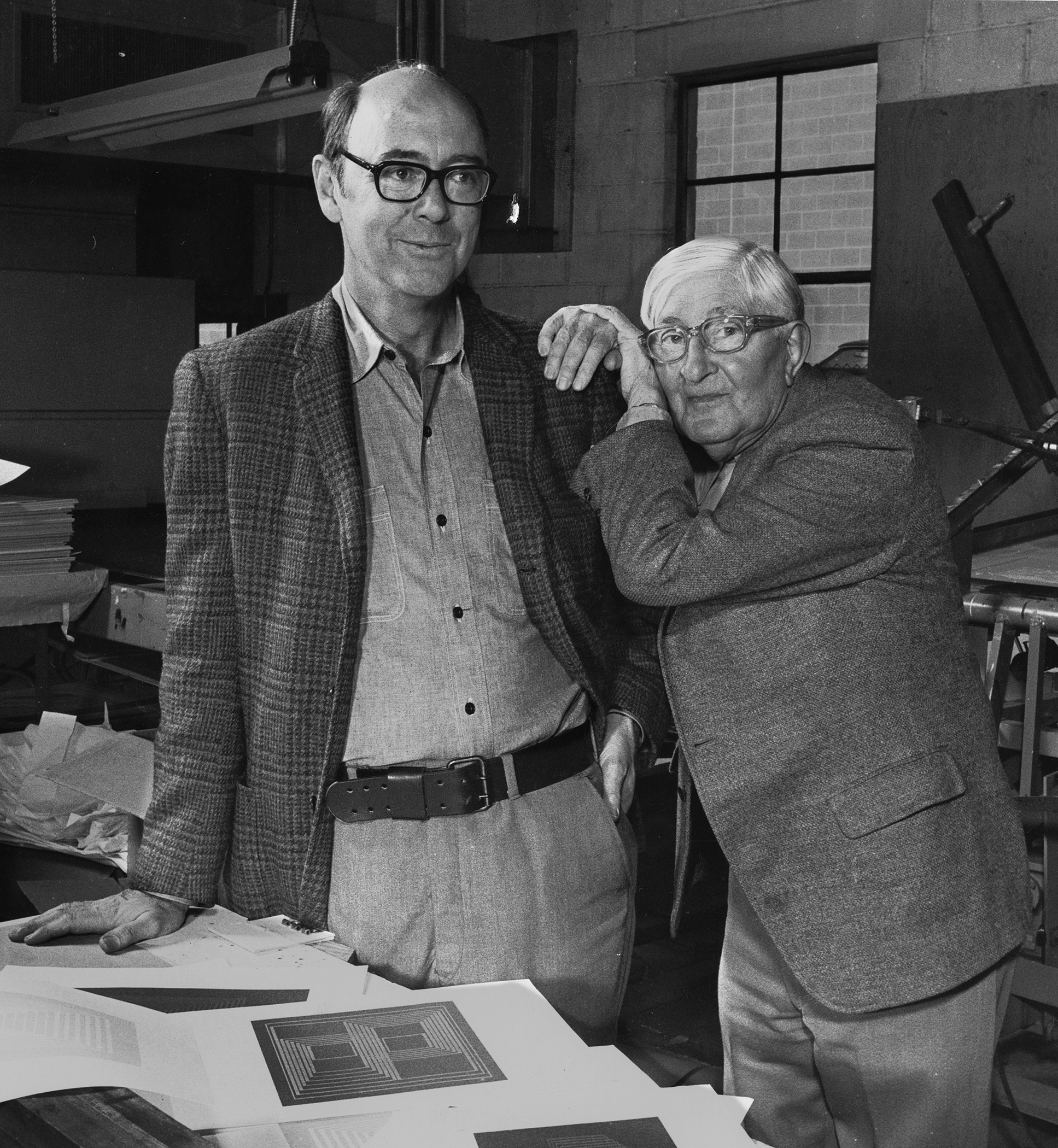
- Norman Ives and Josef Albers (1972) at Sirocco Screenprints Inc. in New Haven
- Born: March 23, 1923; Panama Canal Zone
- Died: February 2, 1978 (aged 54); New Haven, Connecticut, U.S.
- Education: Wesleyan University, Yale University
- Movement: Mid-Modernist
- Spouse: Constance Taffinder
- Children: 4

Norman Seaton Ives (1923–1978) was an American artist, graphic designer, educator, and fine art publisher. He co-founded Ives-Sillman, Inc. alongside Sewell Sillman, which published silkscreen prints and photographs in monographic art portfolios.

== Biography ==
Norman Seaton Ives was born March 23, 1923, in the Panama Canal Zone, to parents Florence Nelson Ives and Capt. Norman Seaton Ives. His father was a career naval officer for the United States. He was married to Constance Taffinder, and they had four sons.

Ives attended Wesleyan University (1950), and Yale University (1952). He studied under Josef Albers.

After graduation in 1952, Ives joined the faculty at Yale University School of Art. By 1974, Ives was made a professor of graphic design at Yale. He worked as a visiting professor at the Royal College of Art in London, University of Hawai'i, and Rhode Island School of Design.

He also did work as a mural painter for movie theaters in Milford, Connecticut.

Ives-Sillman, Inc. was founded in 1958 by Ives and his co-worker and fellow professor at Yale University, Sewell Sillman. They first published, Josef Albers: Interaction of Color (1963). Other artist published included Walker Evans, Roy Lichtenstein, Piet Mondrian, Ad Reinhardt, Jean Dubuffet, Jacob Lawrence, and Romare Bearden.

== Death and legacy ==
Norman Seaton Ives died on February 2, 1979, of lung cancer in St. Raphael's Hospital in New Haven, Connecticut.

Ives’ work can be found in public art and museum collections including the Minneapolis Institute of Art, Museum of Modern Art, Yale University Art Gallery, National Gallery of Art, and others. Photographer Walker Evans took many photographs of Ives, these works (via the Walker Evans Archives) are now held at the Metropolitan Museum of Art, and the Yale University Art Gallery.
