= Avenida Alvear =

Street in Buenos Aires, Argentina

Coordinates: 34°35′21″S 58°23′13″W

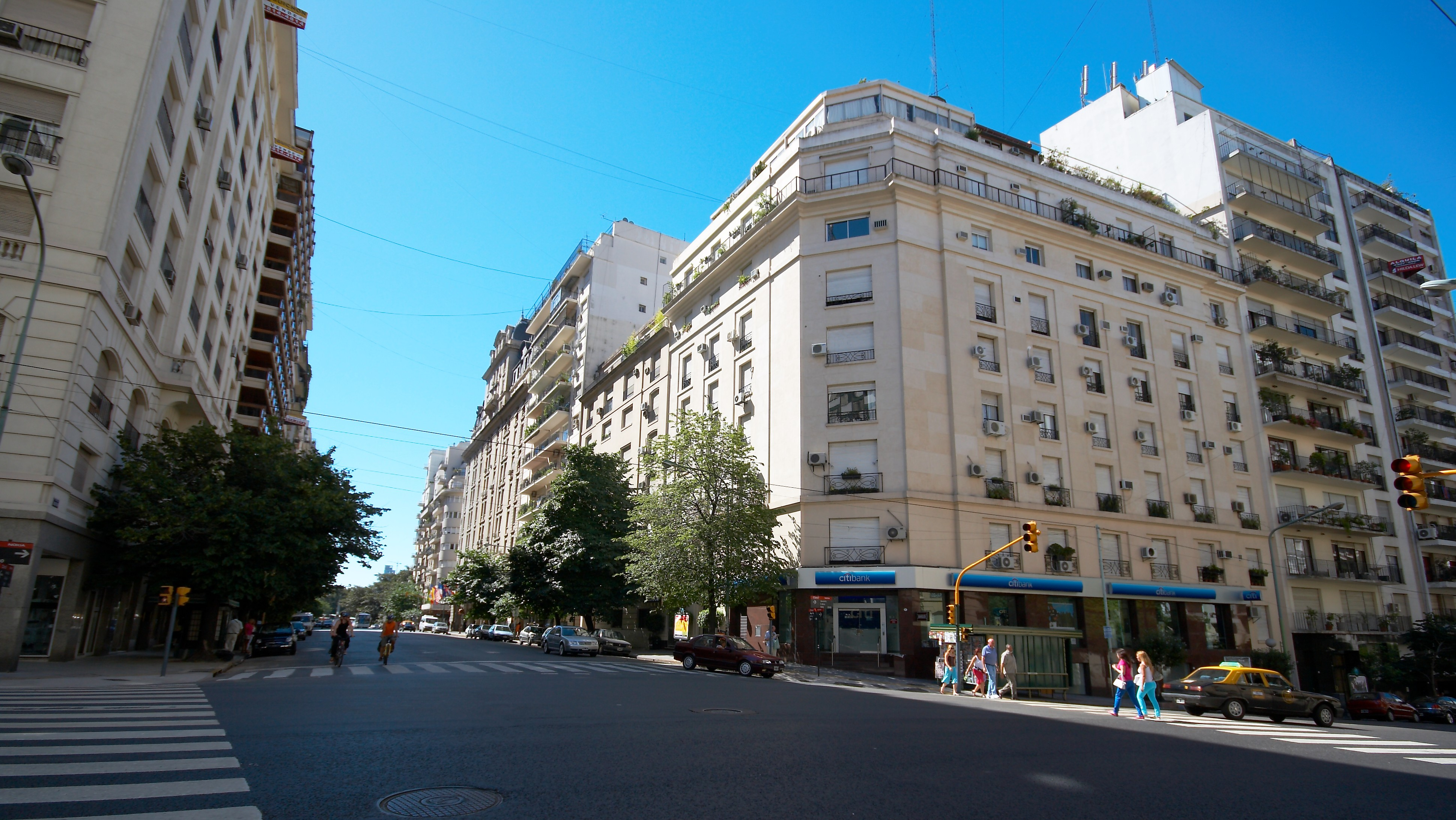
Intersection of Alvear and Callao Avenues.

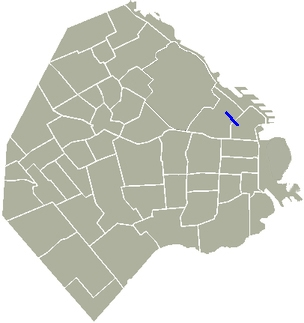
Location of Avenida Alvear in Buenos Aires.

Avenida Alvear is an upscale thoroughfare in Buenos Aires, Argentina. Located in the neighbourhood of Recoleta, it extends for seven blocks, from the Plazoleta Carlos Pellegrini to Alvear Plaza. The avenue is famous not only for the most exclusive representatives of haute couture, but also for its numerous demi-palaces and extensive presence of the French academy architecture that was so much in vogue in uptown Buenos Aires at the turn of the 20th century. The Buenos Aires Legislature approved the bill to declare it as a Historic Protection Area. A study by the U.S. television network NBC, placed it among the world's five most distinguished avenues.

== History ==
The avenue was begun in 1885 on the initiative of Mayor Torcuato de Alvear, whose tenure is remembered for its ambitious urbanism projects patterned after those used by Baron Haussmann in Paris. The Ortiz Basualdo Palace (today the French Embassy) and the Pereda Palace (the Brazilian Embassy) are the most famous among Avenida Alvear's many examples of Belle Époque architecture. Other well-known buildings include the Tudor Revival Hume House (the Secretariat of Culture and the oldest of the avenue's mansions), the Duhau Palace (converted into the Park Hyatt Buenos Aires hotel), the Fernández Anchorena Palace (today the Apostolic Nunciature), and the Alvear Palace Hotel, which dates from 1932.

Near the avenue stands Patio Bullrich, which also used to house numerous international high end shops such as Carolina Herrera, Kenzo, and Tiffany & Co. Under import restrictions, only a few international brands have chosen to stay such as Calvin Klein, Salvatore Ferragamo and Zara. The avenue is also known for its northern end, site of the Recoleta Cemetery, a national historic site.

Belle Époque architecture of Avenida Alvear

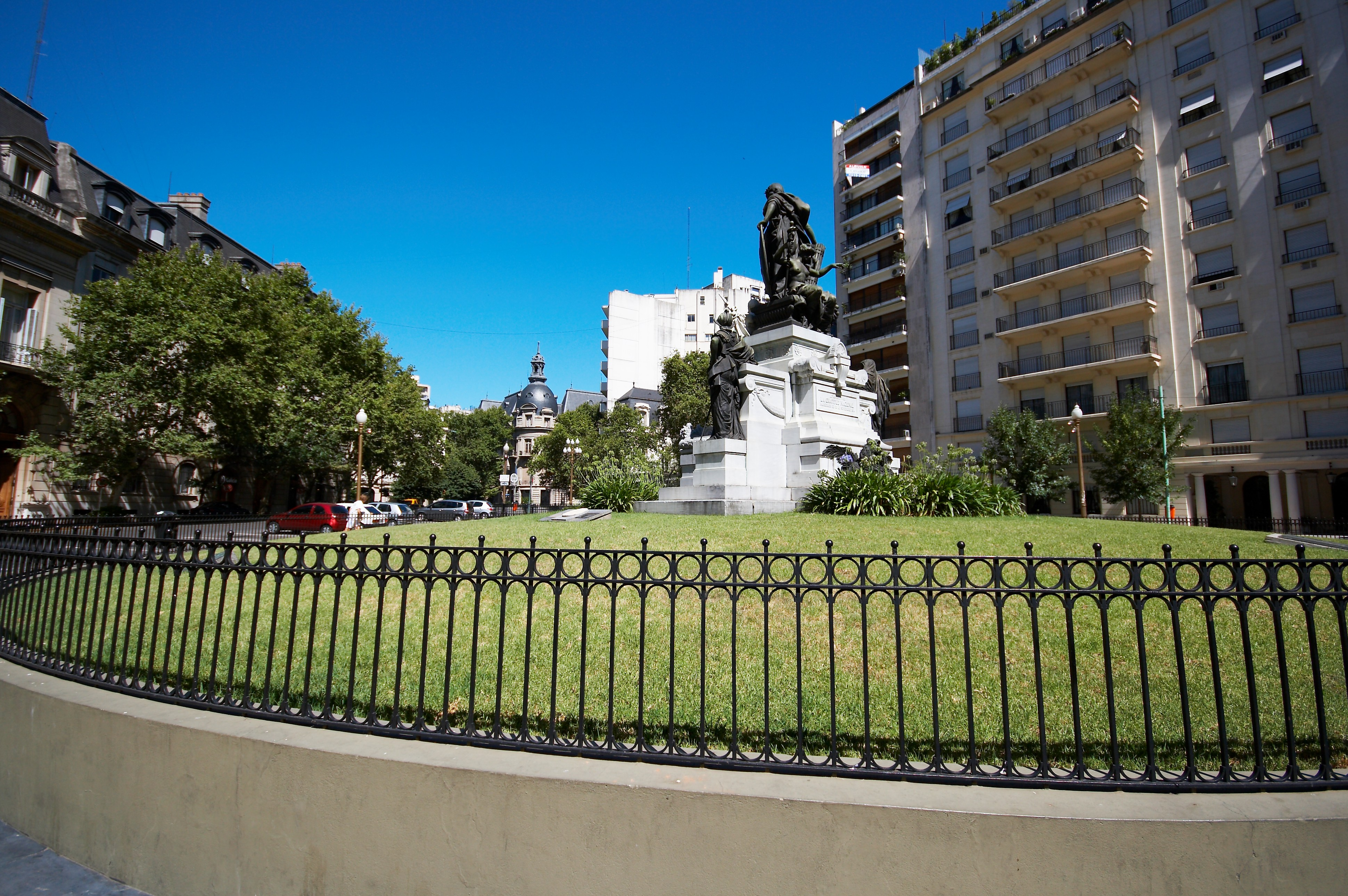
Carlos Pellegrini square

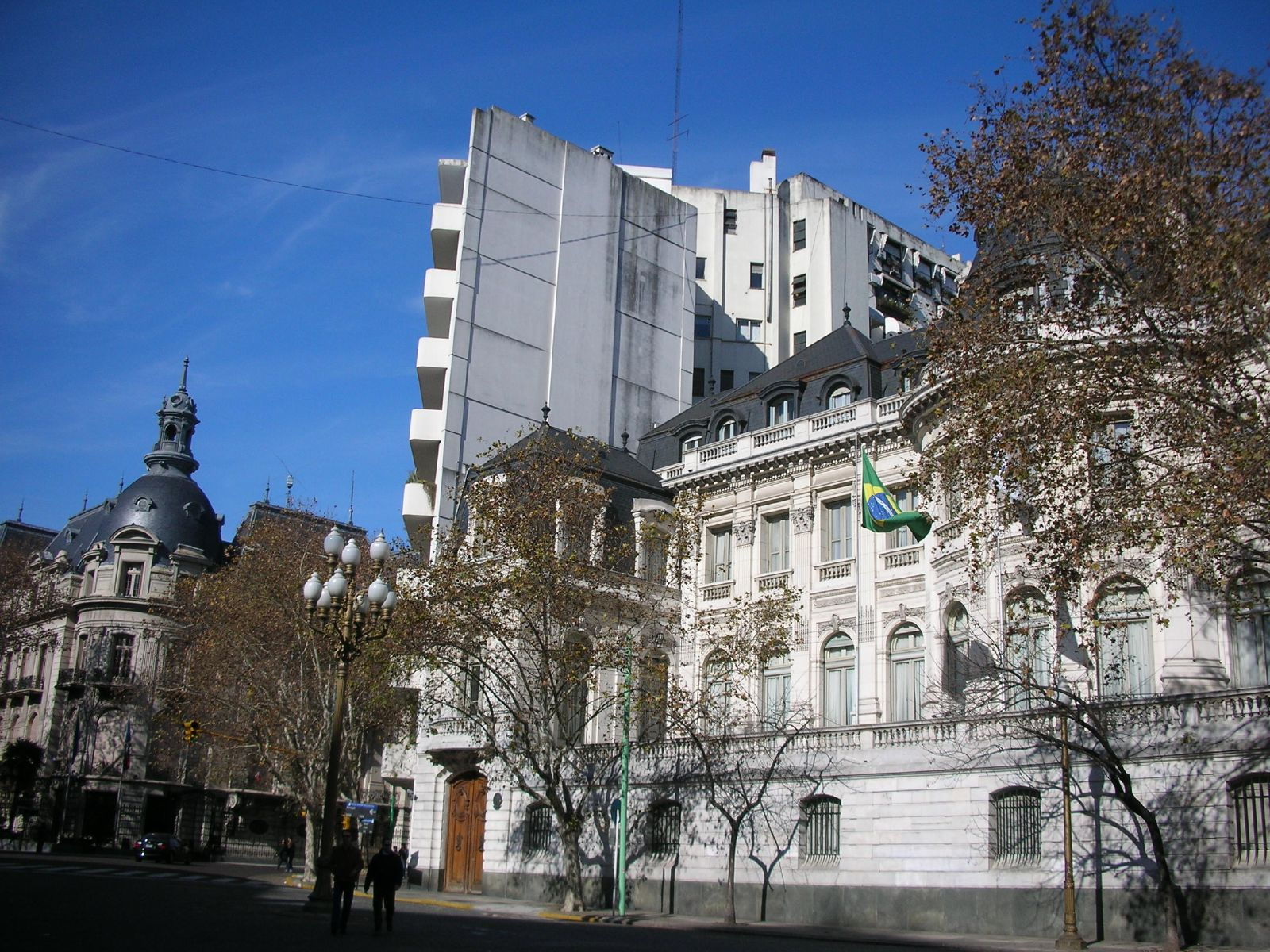
French (left) and Brazilian Embassies

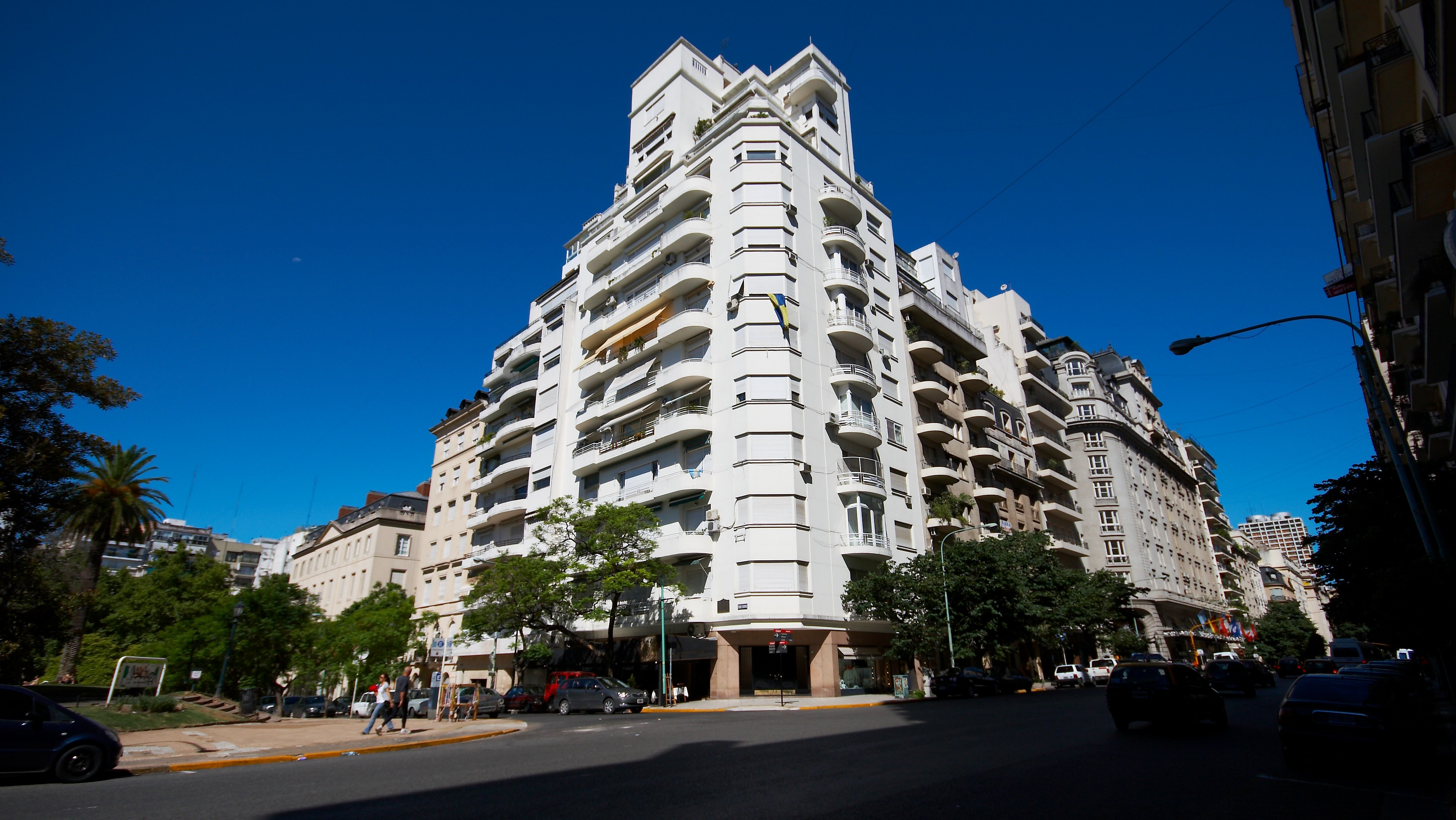
Approaching Alvear Plaza
