= Janeil Engelstad =

American artist and curator

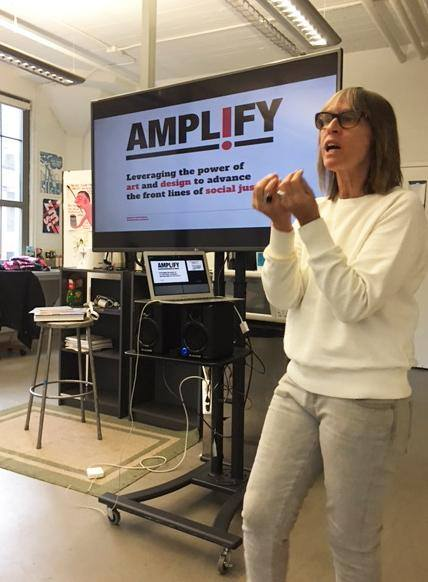
- Janeil Engelstad
- Born: Seattle, Washington
- Education: New York University, University of Washington

Janeil Engelstad is an American artist and curator. Her work focuses on the role of the arts and design in addressing social and environmental concerns. In addition to working independently, Engelstad produces projects through her organization Make Art with Purpose (MAP).

== Work ==
Engelstad's early photography and video work examined gender, identity and the landscape. At graduate school, in a joint program between New York University and International Center of Photography, Engelstad studied with and was influenced by Peter Campus and fellow NYU alumni Félix González-Torres. It was during this time that she became concerned with creating spaces for stories underrepresented by the mainstream media. She volunteered as a photography and video instructor at a homeless shelter in East New York, Brooklyn. This experience moved Engelstad to focus her work on the then nascent field of Social Practice and co-produce her fist major project, Art Works: Teenagers and Artists Collaborate on the Polaroid 20 x 24 Camera, which included Gonzáles-Torres, Andres Serrano, Laurie Simmons, William Wegman and Chuck Close.

Engelstad has published widely, including zines, essays and op-eds. In 2023 she guest edited and wrote an essay for a special section of Leonardo (MIT Press), the leading international peer-reviewed journal on the use of contemporary science and technology in the arts and music, focused on the work of Helen Mayer Harrison and Newton Harrison. The Harrisons were among the founding members of Engelstad's organization, Make Art with Purpose. Beginning in 2022, Engelstad focused her curatorial practice on supporting Ukrainian artists and cultural producers. With curator and art historian Lilia Kudelia, she co-produced Vich-na-Vich (2022) a video exhibition in downtown Dallas in conjunction with the Dallas Art Fair and a series of conversations with Ukrainian artists, writers, curator and cultural producers on the impact of the war on their lives and cultural production, published on MIT's Art Margins Online.

== Projects ==
=== What About Empathy? ===
What About Empathy? Grew from Engelstad’s concern about the deep and bitter divisions between people in the United States, as well as in other parts of the world. Developed in partnership with Mark Randall, Assistant Professor of Strategic Design and Management at Parsons School of Design in New York, the project consists of workshops with design exercises that foster deep listening and dialogue. The project was launched at Parsons in the winter of 2024 and continued in the summer of 2024 at PREM International School in Thailand, in the fall of 2024 at the University of Texas at Dallas, and at the Trans Cultural Exchange’s 2025 International Conference on Opportunities in the Arts: Avenues for Daring in Cambridge, MA in 2025. Project outcomes include the formation of a collective in New York that explores empathy through the creation of third spaces for conversations across differences, along with a public art installation at PREM featuring empathy flags produced from the workshop content.

=== Voices From the Center ===
In 2011, Voices From the Center is an oral history project on changes in Poland, Czech Republic, Slovakia and Hungary since the demolition of the Berlin Wall. The project stemmed from Engelstad's experience as a Fulbright Scholar teaching at the Academy of Fine Arts and Design, Bratislava, Slovak Republic. Wanting to understand the impact of socialism on individuals and their outlook towards the USA, in relationship to her own experience growing up in the Western side of The Cold War, Engelstad had conversations with people about their lives before and after the fall of the Berlin Wall. Many of the participants, who ranged in age from 45–85, felt that despite the historical attention paid to life during Eastern bloc communism, the profundity of their experiences was being lost to history. Engelstad created Voices From the Center with the intention of including views on socialism in Central Europe from all of the Visegrád Group countries. The project also included contributions from young adults, who had been children when the wall came down, about their views of life in the post-communist era. People from both groups talked about what freedom meant to them and had the opportunity to express their dreams, fears and hopes for themselves, their country and the world. Material from Voices From the Center was exhibited at galleries and museums, including Stanica Žilina-Záriečie Cultural Centre (Žilina, Slovak Republic), threewalls (Chicago), libraries public art produced throughout Slovakia, including a public transit campaign and on the project website, https://voicesfromthecenter.net/, which was designed in collaboration with the Polish design team Grafixpol, as an art piece in and of itself. First produced in 2009 in conjunction with the 20th anniversary of the fall of the Berlin Wall, Engelstad revisited and expanded the project in 2019, with a focus on interviewing people that were part of the Solidarity movement in Poland, including Bogdan Borusewicz.

=== AMPL!FY ===
AMPL!FY grew from the national project Dialogues on Race, a project that Engelstad designed and produced through Make Art with Purpose. Participants including artists, graphic designers, activists, organizations and youth created billboards and posters on racial equality issues, which were then discussed in community forums. After the United States Presidential Election, 2016, Engelstad worked with graphic designer Mark Randall (2017 American Institute of Graphic Arts Gold Medalist) to change Dialogues on Race into a project that aimed to address political divisions in a productive way. Project partners of AMPL!FY included the Museum of Arts and Design, New York City Department of Transportation’s Art Program (NYC DOT) and Harlem Stage. Its goal is to create media content and promotion for grassroots organizations working on social and environmental issues. Operating in New York City in 2017 and 2018, AMPL!FY included posters designed by a graphic designer or artist working in partnership with a non-profit organization, installed in the Financial District in Manhattan and in Harlem, using NYC DOT's exhibition display cases. An accompanying exhibition at MAD included participatory public programs that aimed to "amplify" social and climate issues. Educational programs were also produced on site where students used the posters to discuss topics such as criminal justice reform, Islamophobia and disability rights, and discussions of the role of activist art in the political and social history of the United States.

=== Beyond Borders ===
As a visiting artist at the Center for Creative Connections, Dallas Museum of Art (DMA), Engelstad produced Beyond Borders, a project on the links between works of art, focusing on cultures and traditions that are little known or misunderstood in 2017. The project was launched at the time of Executive Order 13769 and Executive Order 13780, which affected on travel to the United States, as well as Executive Order 13767 which ordered a wall to be built on Mexico–United States border. Engelstad created a set of laminated cards featuring six works of art from the DMA's permanent collection. The front of each card includes an image of the selected work of art and a phrase that Engelstad wrote or found. Her interpretation of the work of art is on the back of each card. The set of cards, in Spanish and English, also includes a map of the three floors of this tour. Beyond Borders also included public programs for museum visitors.

=== Art and the environment in Eastern and Central Europe ===
Engelstad was guest producer of a special issue of the online edition of the MIT journal ARTMargins, on historical and contemporary environmental art in the former Eastern Bloc countries and their relationship to capitalism, globalization, climate change and the legacy of socialism. Participants included Nina Czlegledy, Maja and Reuben Fowkes, Tamás Kaszás, Marjetica Potrč and Rudolf Sikora. The project included interviews and other forms of interaction with artists and cultural producers concerned with the idea and the material reality of what goes by the name of the "natural environment."

=== Peace Room / Make Room for Peace ===
Engelstad sent questionnaires to people in living in North America, Europe and the Middle East on their ideas about peace following the September 11 attacks. The material that was sent to Engelstad by the survey participants, including poetry, prose, images and music was collected into a book and was followed by design of a public space with furniture and tableware within the gallery. The exhibition space was used to discuss the many different definitions of peace and the tangibility of peace within individuals and groups. Peace Room / Make Room for Peace was published in the Chicago Tribune newspaper, where readers were asked to contribute their own vision of peace to be designed on their own peace plate. Families, school and church groups, individuals and pairs from the U.S. states of Wisconsin, Illinois and Indiana sent in designs. A panel, consisting of Engelstad, a peace policy professional and editors from the Tribune selected the winning designs.

=== Peace Signs / Visualizing Violence ===
In partnership with Mark Randall of World Studio, Engelstad created and produced a multi-platform media art project called Peace Signs on youth gun violence in San Francisco, Los Angeles, Washington, D.C., New York and Chicago. Each iteration of the project included workshops for high school and college students in design, media literacy and violence prevention. The material and events produced through Peace Signs included billboards, transit posters, exhibitions, public talks and a peace parade.

=== Identity/Identité ===
Produced in collaboration with Canadian artist Deborah Bennett in Montréal and Toronto, the year-long project Identity/Identité was on the relationship between language, cultural identity, and nationalism between the citizens of English and French speaking Canada. Work produced through this project was exhibited in galleries and libraries, and projected from storefronts in Toronto and Montréal. Project partners included Toronto Public Library, University of Toronto, Oboro Art Centre, and Concordia University.

=== Make Art with Purpose ===
In 2010 Engelstad founded Make Art with Purpose (MAP). Working in collaboration and across disciplines, MAP invites communities in the design and production of work to co-produce work on international social and environmental issues.

== Articles, Criticism, and Publications ==
- The Art of Giving: A Conversation with Elvin Flamingo. In: ObsessiveStates, Łaźnia Centre for Contemporary Art, Gdanzk, Poland, 2025
- Voices From Ukraine, a series of chat books, documenting Janeil Engelstad's conversations with artists and other cultural producers in Ukraine, Make Art with Purpose, Dallas, TX, 2024
- Remembering The Harrisons. Guest Editor. Introduction, endnote author, Leonardo (peer review), MIT Press, June 2023
- Helen and Newton Harrison: Reimagining the Context of Art, Author, The Nature of Cities, (peer review), 2023
- Vich-na-Vich: A Conversation – Ukraine Extreme Care Time. ARTMargins on-line, August 1, 2022
- Local Zine Uses Art To Move The Needle On Mental Health. ArtandSeek.net June 11, 2021
- MAP2020: The Further We Roll, The More We Gain. Exhibition Catalog, Editor, Art Director, introduction author, Make Art with Purpose, Dallas, TX, 2020
- Laco Teren at Slovak National Gallery. eutopia, January 2020
- Franciszka Themerson at Łaźnia Centre for Contemporary Art. eutopia, January 2020
- Present, Engage, and Finally, Love: The Art Conference as a Site of Action and Departure. In: Exploring New Horizons (peer review), edited by Mary Sherman, Vernon Press, Wilmington, Delaware, 2019
- Markus Schinwald at CCA Wattis for Contemporary Arts, San Francisco. Temporary Art Review, July 2016
- MAP – Make Art with Purpose: Building Relationships and Initiating Change. In: Developing Civic Engagement in Urban Public Art Programs, edited by Jessica L. DeShazo and Zachary Smith (peer review), pages 103 – 107. Rowman & Littlefield, Lanham, Maryland, 2015
- Ed Atkins: Ribbons. Temporary Art Review, September 2015
- Sean Miller at Pariah. eutopia, August 2015
- Zanele Muholi at Brooklyn Museum. eutopia, July 2015
- At Dade Middle School Art has made a positive difference. Op-Ed, Dallas Morning News, May 29, 2015
- Marcus Schinwald at CCA Wattis Institute of Contemporary Arts, San Francisco. eutopia, Feb/March 2015
- Ed Atkins, Ribbons. eutopia, September 2014
- Art & the Environment in East-Central Europe. Organized multi-platform virtual and print project, ARTMargins online and ARTMargins journal (peer review), MIT Press, July 2014.
- Rebecca Carter, Sleep Architecture and the Dream House. eutopia, April 2014
- MAP 2013: The Workbook. Editor, Art Director and Introduction Author, Make Art with Purpose, Dallas, TX,2014
- Art, Activism and Community: Achieving Action with Labour. In: Transmission Annual: Labour Work Action, edited by Michael Corris, Jaspar Joseph-Lester and Sharon Kivland, pages 39 – 43. Artwords Press, London, UK, 2013
- MAP: Make Art with Purpose. In: The Dallas Pavilion, edited by Michael Corris and Jaspar Joseph- Lester, pages 76– 79, Free Museum of Dallas, Southern Methodist University, Dallas, Texas, 2013
- The Nurse. Essay for The Nurse, Katherine L. Ross exhibition catalog, Lillstreet Learning Center, 2002
- Art Works: Teenagers and Artists Collaborate on the Polaroid 20 x 24 Camera. Publication Coordinator and Forward Co-Author, The Education Project, New York, NY, 1993

== Awards & Honors ==
- Artist Residency Thailand, Chiang Mai, Thailand, Artist Residency, 2024
- COIL Fellow, University of Washington, 2023
- Red Bull, Artist Grant, 2020
- Nasher Sculpture Center, Artist Grant, 2020
- Laźnia Centre for Contemporary Art, Gdańsk, Poland, Artist in Residence, 2019
- Dallas Museum of Art, Visiting Artist, 2017
- Dallas Mastermind Award, 2014
- Fulbright Scholar, Academy of Fine Arts and Design, Bratislava, Slovak Republic, 2006
