= JoAnn Kuchera-Morin =

Composer and university professor

- Born: 1951 (age 74–75)
- Citizenship: U.S.
- Education: Eastman School of Music; University of Rochester; Florida State University
- Known for: Scientific Visualization; Multi-modal Data Representation; Artistic creation Composition: acoustic, electro-acoustic, computer music Digital signal processing aspects of computer music Sound spatialization acoustics, psychoacoustics
- Spouse: Timothy Francis Morin
- Children: Glenna Rosaleen Morin
- Website: Media Arts and Technology UCSB

Notes
- CREATE Website https://www.create.ucsb.edu/

JoAnn Kuchera-Morin (born 1951) is a professor of media arts & technology and of music. A composer and researcher specializing in multimodal interaction, she is the creator and director of the AlloSphere at the California NanoSystems Institute and the creator and director of the Center for Research in Electronic Art Technology (CREATE) at the University of California, Santa Barbara. Kuchera-Morin initiated and was chief scientist of the University of California Digital Media Innovation Program (DiMI) from 1998 to 2003.

The culmination of Kuchera-Morin’s creativity and research is the AlloSphere instrument, a 30-foot-diameter, 3-story-high metal sphere inside an echo-free cube, designed for immersive, interactive scientific and artistic investigation of multi-dimensional data sets. Scientifically, the AlloSphere is an instrument for gaining insight and developing bodily intuition about environments into which the body cannot venture—abstract higher-dimensional information spaces, the worlds of the very small or very large, and the realms of the very fast or very slow. Artistically, it is an instrument for the creation and performance of avant-garde new works and the development of new modes and genres of expression and forms of immersion-based entertainment. Kuchera-Morin serves as the director of the AlloSphere Research Facility located within the California NanoSystems Institute, Elings Hall, at the University of California, Santa Barbara. Kuchera-Morin received her Ph.D. from Eastman School of Music at the University of Rochester (1984). She previously earned M.M. (1980) and B.M. degrees from the Florida State University.

Kuchera-Morin's music mixes digital and acoustic instruments, such as her Concerto For Clarinet and Clarinets (1991), for solo clarinet and computer-generated tape. Her music features some of the earliest and most extensive use of phase vocoder transformations (stretching 30 seconds into 3 minutes, spectral glissandi, etc.).

- Dreampaths (1989)
- Cantata (1989)
- Paleo (2000), for double-bass and tape
