= Sewell Sillman =

American painter, educator, and print publisher

- Born: October 24, 1924; Savannah, Georgia, U.S.
- Died: April 5, 1992 (aged 67); Lyme, Connecticut, U.S.
- Education: Black Mountain College; Yale University

Sewell Sillman (1924 – 1992) was an American painter, educator, and print publisher. He co-founded Ives-Sillman, Inc. alongside partner Norman Seaton Ives, which published silkscreen prints and photographs in monographic art portfolios.

== Biography ==
Sewell Sillman was born in October 24, 1924 in Savannah, Georgia. He attended Black Mountain College, studying under Josef Albers. Sillman transferred to Yale University (alongside a move to Yale by Albers), he graduated with a BFA degree in 1951, and a MFA degree in 1953.

Sillman joined the faculty at Yale University, working from 1953 to 1966. Additionally he taught at Carnegie Institute of Technology (now known as Carnegie Mellon University) from 1963 to 1965; Rhode Island School of Design (RISD) from 1966 to 1985; and was a professor of art at University of Pennsylvania from 1985 to 1990. Sillman was also teaching at Parsons School of Design. Sillman had many notable students including Bruce Helander, Newton Harrison, Howardena Pindell, as well as others. Sillman's lessons often focused on color theory.

Ives-Sillman, Inc. was founded in 1958 by Sillman and his co-worker and fellow professor at Yale University, Norman Seaton Ives. They first published, Josef Albers: Interaction of Color (1963). Other artist published included Walker Evans, Roy Lichtenstein, Piet Mondrian, Ad Reinhardt, Jean Dubuffet, Jacob Lawrence, and Romare Bearden.

He died of cancer in April 5, 1992 at his home in Lyme, Connecticut.
