= Palacio Duhau - Park Hyatt Buenos Aires =

Hotel in Buenos Aires, Argentina

Coordinates: 34°35′21″S 58°23′10″W

Palacio Duhau Park Hyatt Buenos Aires
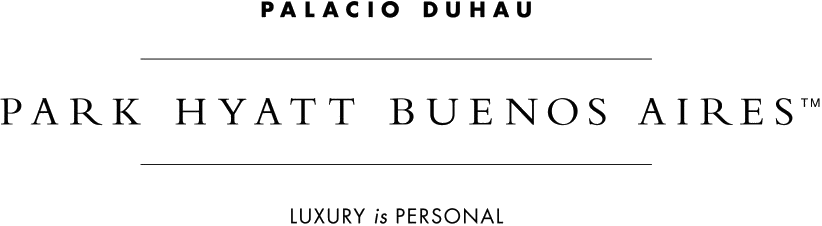

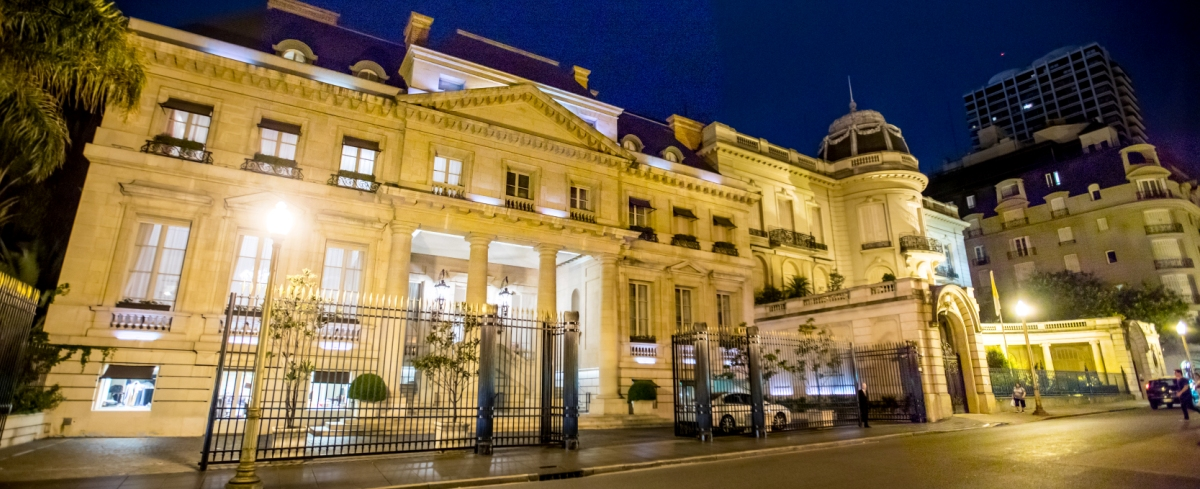
- The building at night
- Interactive map of the Palacio Duhau; Park Hyatt Buenos Aires area

General information
- Architectural style: Neoclassical
- Location: Avenida Alvear 1661
- Opened: 1934; 92 years ago
- Renovated: 2006
- Owner: Hyatt

Design and construction
- Architect: Leon Dourge

Other information
- Number of rooms: 165
- Number of restaurants: 2
- Number of bars: 1

Website
- palacioduhauexperience.com

National Historic Monument of Argentina
- Designated: 2002

The Palacio Duhau - Park Hyatt Buenos Aires is a five star hotel located in the city's Recoleta section. Originally opened in 1934, the palace has been operated by multinational hospitality company Hyatt since 2006. The palace was declared national historic landmark in 2002.

== Overview ==
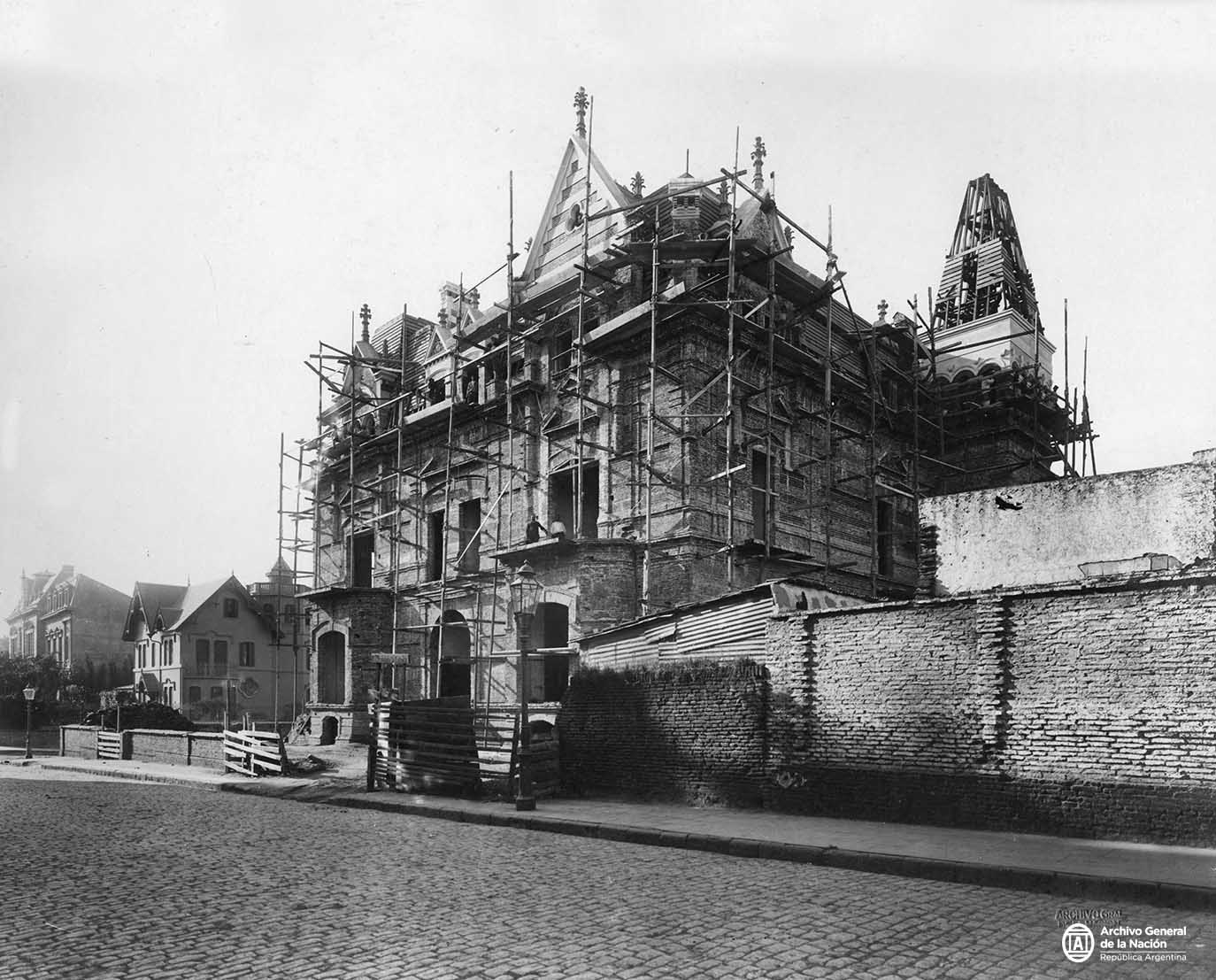
The original building c. 1898. It would be later demolished to build the current palace.

The original building was built on an Alvear Avenue lot belonging to Teodoro de Bary and designed by architect Carlos Nordmann in 1898. Built over a bluff, the lot behind the house remained unimproved until the City Parks Commissioner, noted urbanist Charles Thays, was hired by the family to landscape and Piveau Gratias the property, in 1913.

The property was demolished and the remaining land, sold to the Duhau brothers in late 1920s. The Duhaus –prominent landowners– commissioned French architect León Dourge for the design of a new residence, Dourge was assisted by architect Carlos Ryder and engineer Carlos Hume. Inspired by the Château du Marais (in Le Val-Saint-Germain, near Paris), the resulting Neoclassical palace and its guesthouse were completed in 1934.

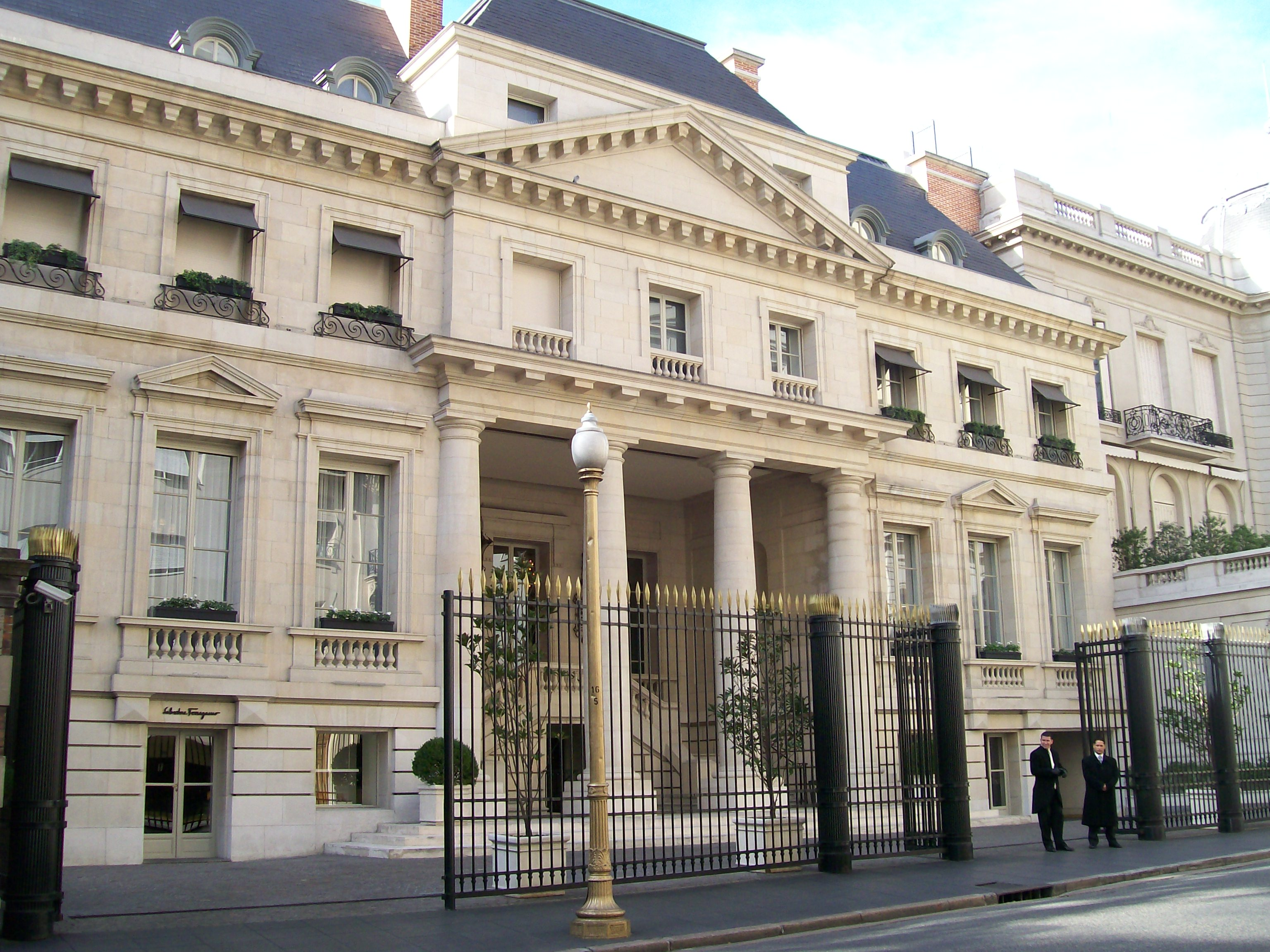
Main facade of the palace after its inauguration as hotel, 2006

The palace was used as residence between 1934 and 1995, when the Duhau heirs decided to sell the property to a business. Nevertheless the palace remained closed until 2000, when it started to be restored. In 2002, local developer Juan Scalesciani purchased the property and secured a partnership with the Hyatt Hotels Corporation. The Chicago-based hotelier planned a Park Hyatt to replace the Retiro-area highrise sold to the Four Seasons Hotels in 2002.

Following a US$74 million investment and numerous delays over privacy concerns regarding the neighboring Vatican nunciature, the "Palacio Duhau - Park Hyatt Buenos Aires" was opened on July 12, 2006. The palace itself, which preserves most of its original work including its distinctive red marble flooring, houses 11 rooms and 12 of the establishment's premium suites. The new annex, constructed at the opposite, eastern end of the gardens, houses the remaining 115 rooms and 27 suites. The hotel also includes two restaurants, bar and tea rooms.

== Notable guests ==
- Sean Penn
- Emma Watson
- Pierre Richard
- Ricky Martin
- India Mahdavi
- Will Smith
- Donald Trump
- Barack Obama
- Máxima of the Netherlands

== In popular culture ==
- The hotel featured in the 2015 film Focus.
