= California NanoSystems Institute =

American integrated research center

Coordinates: 34.068°N 118.4429°W

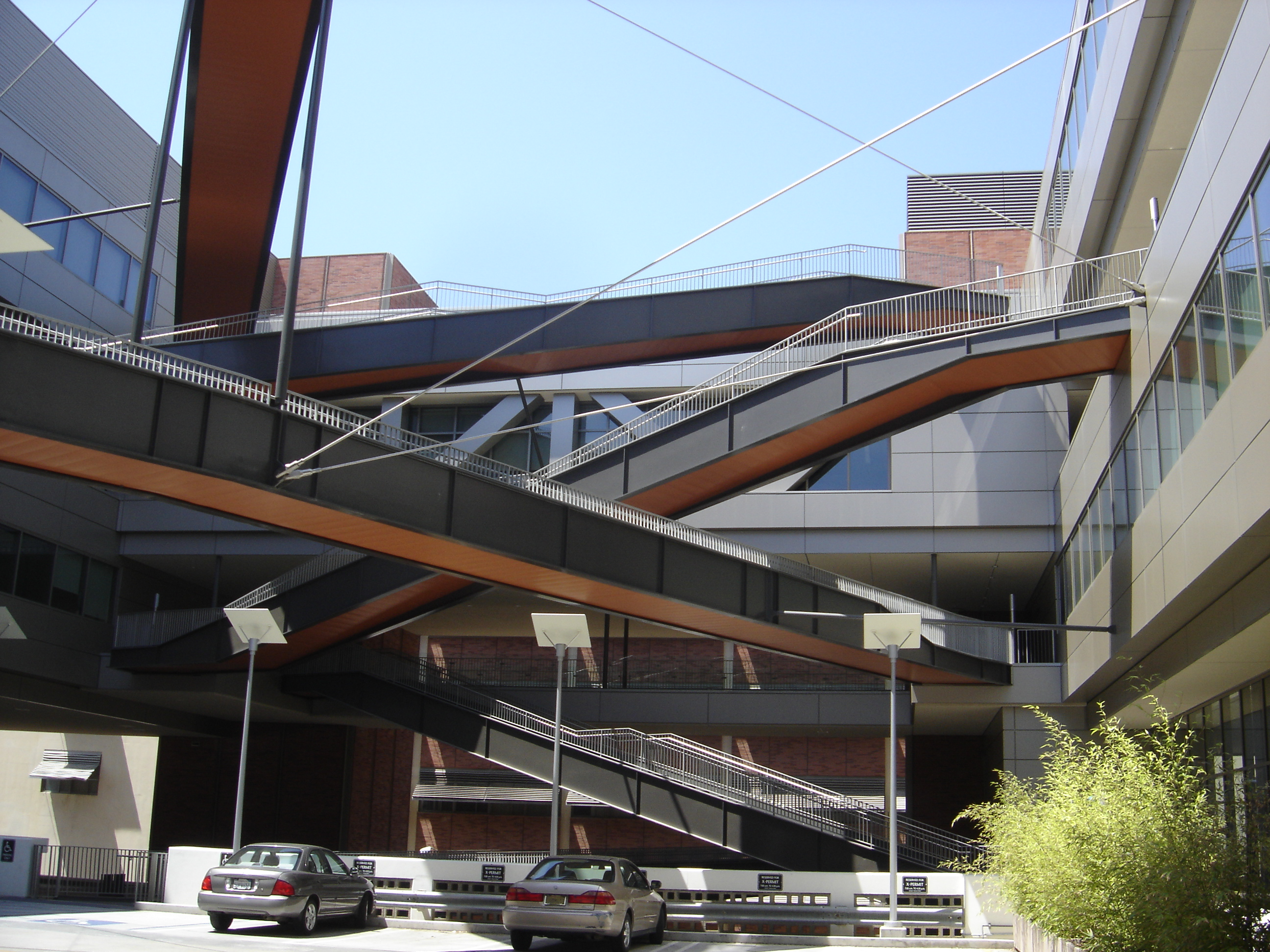
California NanoSystems Institute interior walkways built over a parking structure at UCLA

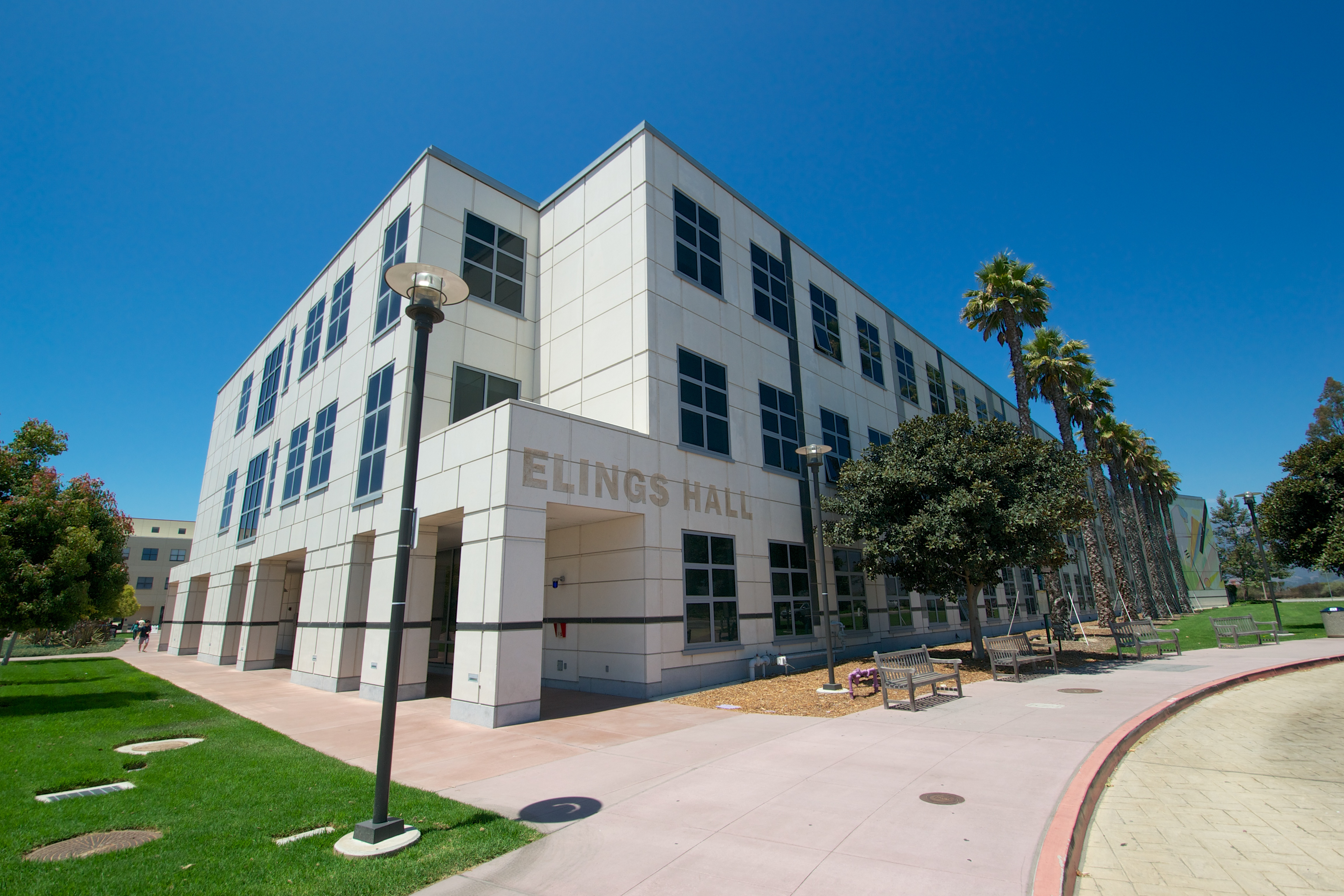
Elings Hall, which houses the California NanoSystems Institute, UCSB

The California NanoSystems Institute (CNSI) is an integrated research center operating jointly at UCLA and UC Santa Barbara. Its missions are to foster interdisciplinary collaborations for discoveries in nanosystems and nanotechnology; train the next generation of scientists, educators, and technology leaders; and facilitate partnerships with industry, fueling economic development and the social well-being of California, the United States and the world.

CNSI was created by Governor Gray Davis as part of a science and innovation initiative, it was established in 2000 with $100 million from the state of California and an additional $250 million in federal research grants and industry funding. At the institute, scientists in the areas of biology, chemistry, biochemistry, physics, mathematics, computational science and engineering measure, modify and manipulate the building blocks the world – atoms and molecules. These scientists benefit from an integrated laboratory culture enabling them to conduct dynamic research at the nanoscale, leading to significant breakthroughs in the areas of health, energy, the environment and information technology.

== History ==
On December 7, 2000, California Governor Gray Davis announced the location of the federally sponsored California NanoSystems Institute section of the California Institutes for Science and Innovation (Cal ISI) initiative. The California legislature put forth $100 million for three research facilities to advance the future of the state's economy. The California NanoSystems Institute (CNSI) was selected out of the proposals along with three other Cal ISIs: California Institute for Quantitative Biosciences (QB3), California Institute for Telecommunications and Information Technology (Cal-(IT)2), and Center for Information Technology Research in the Interest of Society (CITRIS). In August 2000, CNSI was founded on both campuses of UCSB and UCLA. Martha Krebs, the former director of the U.S. Department of Energy's Office of Science, was named the founder.

== Active leaders ==
=== UCLA ===
The people in charge of UCLA CNSI fall into two categories: directors and associate directors.

==== Directorship ====
- Jeff F. Miller, Ph.D. - Director

==== Associate Directors ====
- Dave Avery - Associate Director of Research Administration
- Andre Nel, M.D., Ph.D. - Director of Research
- Heather Maynard, Ph.D. - Associate Director of Technology & Development
- Aydogan Ozcan, Ph.D. - Associate Director of Entrepreneurship, Industry and Academic Exchange
- Leonard H. Rome, Ph.D. - Associate Director of Facilities Management
- Adam Z. Stieg, Ph.D. - Associate Director of Technology Centers

=== UCSB ===
The people in charge of UCSB CNSI fall into two categories: administrative staff and the faculty.

==== Directorship ====
- Craig Hawker - Director
- Javier Read de Alaniz - Associate Director
- Megan Valentine - Associate Director
- Stephen Wilson - Associate Director

==== Administrative staff ====
- Holly Woo - Assistant Director, Administration
- Eva Deloa - Financial Manager
- Bob Hanson - Building Manager
  - The building manager is responsible for the maintenance, facility resource leads, and infrastructure of CNSI. The building manager oversees any changes in infrastructure or maintenance to the labs or the building as a whole.

==== Biology and biomedical ====
The research fields of nanobiology (nanobiotechnology) and biomedicine show promise in the connection of nanoscale science to biological/nonbiological matter. New diagnostic methods and ways to administer increasingly efficient disease-specific treatments are also being researched and developed.

==== Energy efficiency ====
Nanotechnology may be able to help fight global warming, as nanoscale research can lead to more efficient, less wasteful technologies. Nanoscale technology could also lead to more efficient ways to control, transform, and store energy.

==== Information technologies ====
Both UCLA and UCSB CNSI labs show potential to develop upgrades in the processing, storage, and transmission of information and increases in the speed of information processing.

== Partnerships ==
The California NanoSystems Institute is dependent on partnerships with technological companies to help fund and run its research facilities. Partnerships fund the operation and expansions of CNSI in addition to the $250 million government research grants received in 2000. Increasing numbers of partnerships were created due to budget cuts by the state.

=== UCLA ===
CNSI has international partnerships with the Chinese Academy of Sciences, the Beijing Nano Center, the University of Tokyo, the University of Kyoto, Kyushu University, Yonsei University, Seoul National University, KAIST, University of Bristol, and Zhejiang University.

==== Founding partners ====
Partners that joined when the institute was created include:

- Abraxis BioScience
- BASF The Chemical Company
- Intel
- HP

==== Associate partners ====
Partners that joined after creation include:

- NEC
- Solarmer Energy, Inc.
- Keithley Instruments Company
- Photron

=== UCSB ===
- Applied Materials
- Hewlett-Packard Labs
- Intel
- Microsoft Research
- Sputtered Films / Tegal Corporation
- Sun Microsystems
- VEECO

== Educational opportunities ==
=== K-12 ===
Both campuses offer several educational opportunities including hands-on laboratory research experience for junior high students and their teachers. These activities are done in collaboration with graduate students researching similar fields. UCSB scientists and researchers run family science nights at local junior highs to allow families to participate in scientific activities with their children with after-school engineering and science club for grades 3–8 to explore science with UCSB undergrad club leaders. CNSI also hosts research opportunities for high school juniors and local Santa Barbara teachers on the UCSB campus. In addition, CNSI at UCSB holds a summer program called SIMS (Summer Institute of Math and Science) for incoming freshmen.

=== Undergraduate ===
Both UCLA and UCSB contribute to various scholarships for incoming freshmen. They offer undergraduate courses that give insight into all fields and majors of math and science. Undergraduates act as club leaders and mentors to younger ages in grades K-12. Undergraduates also have extensive research opportunities in several fields during the year and through summer on either campus. Students within CNSI's UCSB affiliation, the UCSB Department of Electrical and Computer Engineering, can choose to intern or volunteer at the institute for lab experience.

=== Graduate ===
Graduate opportunities are limited to:

- Mentoring:
  - Community college students
  - Incoming freshmen
  - High school juniors
  - High school teachers
  - Undergraduates
- Assisting researchers in the lab

== See also ==
- AlloSphere
- Scientists, Technologists and Artists Generating Exploration (STAGE)
