= Solarmer Energy, Inc. =

Defunct American solar energy company

- Type: Private
- Industry: Solar energy, Renewable energy
- Founded: 2006 in El Monte, California
- Founder: Edward T.J. Chen; Woolas Hsieh; Jennifer Yu
- Headquarters: El Monte, California
- Key people: Edward T.J. Chen (CEO); Woolas Hsieh (President)
- Number of employees: 26 (2009).
- Website: www.solarmer.com

Solarmer Energy, Inc. was a solar energy company that was developing polymer solar cells, a new type of solar cell; specifically, a subtype of organic photovoltaic cells (OPV). They claim their solar panels can be made flexible, transparent, and will cost less to manufacture than traditional cells.

Solarmer was initially founded in March 2006 to commercialize a portfolio of technology developed by Prof. Yang Yang at the University of California, Los Angeles and has since established its own facility in El Monte, California. In addition to this portfolio, Solarmer also licensed the patent rights to a new semi-conducting material invented at the University of Chicago.

== Technology ==
Solarmer’s technology is based on using a semiconducting plastic as the active material in the solar cell, which is what converts light into electricity. In contrast to other photovoltaic technologies, this technology is capable of producing electricity using any kind of lighting, although the lower the light, the less electricity produced. However a major setback of this technology is the relatively low efficiency and, more importantly, lack of stability. Solarmer does have one of the highest efficiencies in the industry with 8.13% (July 2010), but this is still lower than other solar technologies.

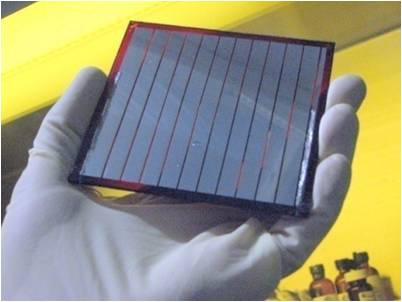
Researcher holding Solarmer's organic solar cell

The plastic active layer is extremely thin (only a few tenths of a micrometer thick), which is why these solar cells can be made both flexible and translucent. It is also part of the reason that the manufacturing process is likely to cost less, since only very small amounts of material are needed to make these solar cells. The other reason is that the materials can be printed, like inks, in a much less capital-intensive process than traditional silicon-based solar cells. There are several different polymers that can be used as the active layer and these polymers come in a variety of colors. Solarmer is planning to use this feature of the technology to make solar cells in different colors.

== Applications ==
Organic solar cells are also typically cheaper than conventional solar cells. Solarmer claims that their organic solar cells could be used on any portable device that requires power, as well as smart fabrics and building materials.

== Production ==
Solarmer is developing a pilot line capable of manufacturing OPV samples and plans to initiate the process of component integration in 2009. They expect to complete their pilot line by the 2nd Quarter of 2010, delivery of samples by the end of 2010, and product launch by early 2011.

== See also ==
- Organic electronics
- Printed electronics
- Organic photovoltaic
- Building-integrated photovoltaics
