= AlloSphere =

Research laboratory at the University of California, Santa Barbara

Coordinates: 34.41578°N 119.8398°W

The AlloSphere Research Facility
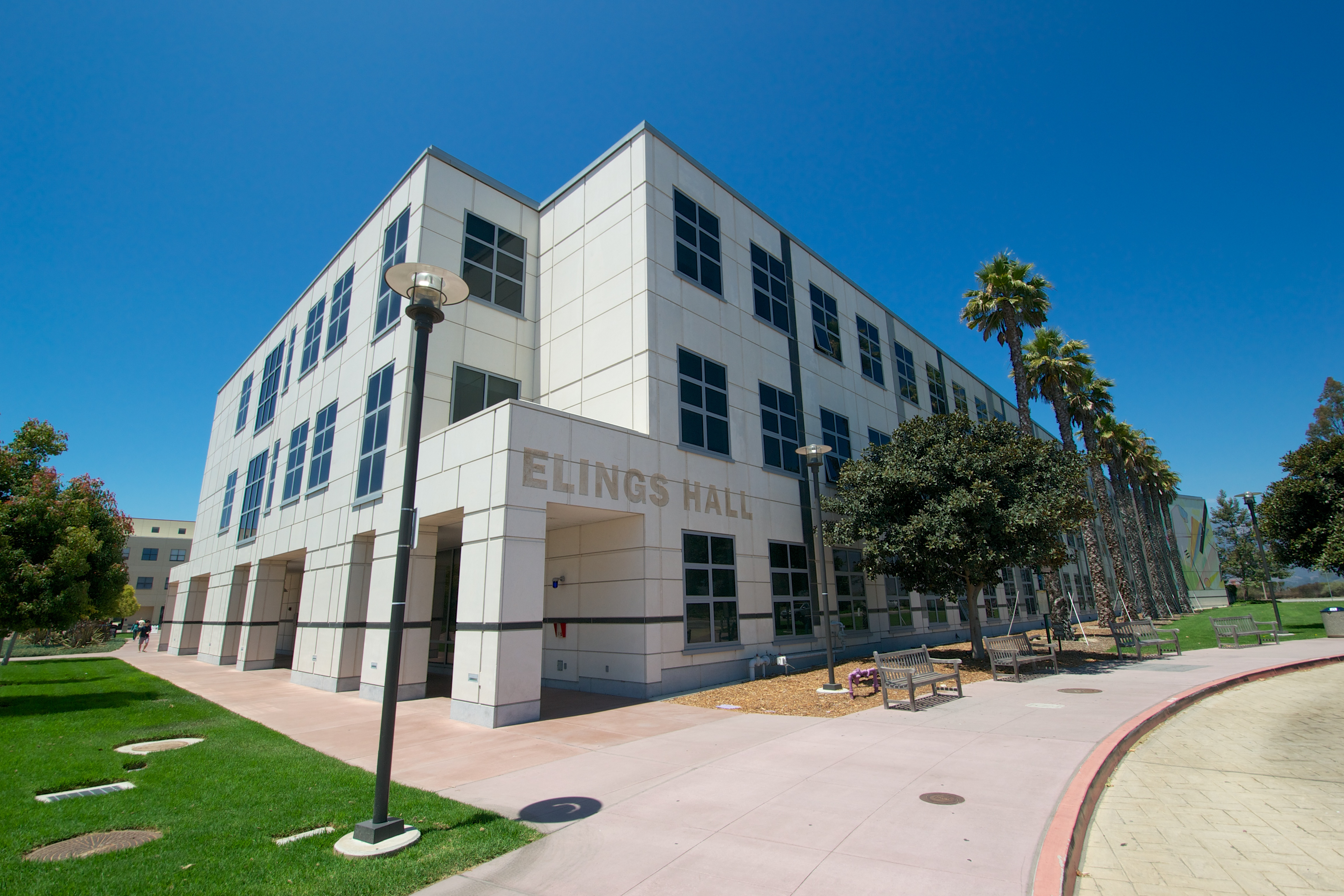
- Elings Hall which houses The AlloSphere, August 2013
- Established: 2007; 19 years ago
- Field of research: Technology, multimedia, sciences, art, design
- Director: JoAnn Kuchera-Morin
- Location: Santa Barbara, California, United States
- Campus: University of California, Santa Barbara
- Website: allosphere.ucsb.edu

The AlloSphere Research Facility (branded as AlloSphere) is a research laboratory at the University of California, Santa Barbara. Housed in a theater-like pavilion with a spherical structure made of opaque material, it is designed to project computer-generated imagery and sound. The facility is used for a wide range of applications, including geographic information systems (GIS), scientific research, artistic exploration, and other forms of data visualization. The AlloSphere grew out from the university's departments of electrical engineering and computer science and the media arts and technology program.

The AlloSphere is housed at UCSB California NanoSystems Institute building, "CNSI," or Elings Hall, a 62,000-square-foot (5,800 m^{2}) facility that opened in 2007. The AlloSphere is intended to integrate technology and media.

The AlloSphere includes a three-story cube that has been insulated extensively with sound-absorbing material, making it one of the largest echo-less chambers in the world. Within the chamber are two hemispheres of 5 meter radii, made of perforated aluminum. These are opaque and acoustically transparent.

There are 26 video projectors, to create as much of a field of vision as possible.

The loudspeaker real-time sound synthesis cluster (140 individual speaker elements plus sub-woofers) is suspended behind the aluminum screen resulting in 3-D audio. Computation clusters include simulation, sensor-array processing, real-time video processing for motion-capture and visual computing, render-farm/real-time ray-tracing and radiosity cluster, and content and prototyping environments.

The AlloSphere was developed by a team of scientists, led primarily by Professor JoAnn Kuchera-Morin, a professor in the field of Composition, of the Media Arts & Technology Program of UCSB.

== Selected publications ==
- The AlloSphere Offers an Interactive Experience of Nano-sized Worlds https://www.nsf.gov/discoveries/disc_summ.jsp?cntn_id=121535&WT.mc_id=USNSF_1
- Research at the AlloSphere Facility https://www.nsf.gov/news/mmg/mmg_disp.jsp?med_id=73444
- Equipping the AlloSphere, an Environment for Immersive Data Exploration https://www.nsf.gov/awardsearch/showAward?AWD_ID=0855279
- Big Data's People-Changing Machine https://www.forbes.com/sites/quentinhardy/2011/07/11/big-datas-people-changing-machine/
- Marriage of Science & Art https://web.archive.org/web/20160302151948/http://www.ucsbalum.com/Coastlines/2011/Summer/feature_allosphere.html
- Living Data: The Three-Story-High AlloSphere Creates Unique Visualizations http://www.technologyreview.com/photoessay/420413/living-data/
- Beiser, Vince (May 24, 2010). "Sensory Overloader: 3-D Tower Lets Researchers Climb Inside Their Data". Wired.
- A 360-Degree Virtual Reality Chamber Brings Researchers Face to Face with Their Data https://www.wired.com/2010/05/st-allosphere/
- Enter the AlloSphere: Inside UCSB's Three-Dimensional Immersive Theater, the 21st Century Face of Our Discipline-Bending University http://www.independent.com/news/2008/nov/06/enter-allosphere/
