= Bruce Helander =

American painter (born 1947)

- Born: Bruce Helander; January 27, 1947 (age 79); Great Bend, Kansas, U.S.
- Education: Rhode Island School of Design
- Known for: Artist

Bruce Helander (born January 27, 1947) is an American artist associated with collage and assemblage. He lives and works in West Palm Beach.

== Early life and education ==
Helander was born in Great Bend, Kansas, to Amos and Carmen Helander. His mother was an interior designer whose eccentric styles inspired him to go on and become an artist. He studied painting and went on to graduate from the Rhode Island School of Design (RISD) with a Bachelor of Fine Arts in 1969 and a Master of Fine Arts in 1972. While attending college, Paul Klee and Sewell Sillman became major influence in Helander's early life.

After graduating, Helander began his career at RISD as a Director of Admissions, eventually becoming the Provost and Vice President of Academic Affairs. During his tenure there, Helander became a White House fellow at the National Endowment for the Arts. Leaving Academia in 1979, Helander became the editor and publisher of the Art Express magazine.

== Work ==
Helander Gallery on Worth Avenue

Bruce Helander is an art critic, art dealer, arts writer, curator, and artist whose specialty is collage and assemblage. He began his career as an art dealer when he opened the Helander Gallery. The Helander Gallery was founded in 1982 and had its first home at Worth Avenue. In 1986 it expanded to include another Palm Beach location and in 1989 it added a new site in New York’s SoHo district.

Helander Gallery quickly rose to prominence opening with such artists as: Chihuly, Rauschenberg, and Scanga. In 1988 Helander brought together John Chamberlain, Duane Hanson, Jules Olitski, Robert Rauschenberg, and James Rosenquist creating the Five Floridians exhibition. Later that year the polyvinyl sculpture by John DeAndrea, Sphinx, was displayed. The sculpture, a lifelike nude woman, brought about controversy over the appropriateness of a publicly displayed nude sculpture.

Helander Gallery became known for selling works by eponymous artists such as Dale Chihuly, Duane Hanson, Robert Rauschenberg, and Andy Warhol.

=== Erotica ===
Helander depicts both the ecstasy and complications of sex in his collages as a means of enhancing the realism in his art. The evocative images contain multiple fragments of parts that rotate around the blank space.

=== Dreams ===
Helander recaptures dreams or expresses content in such a way that they can be interpreted as dreams. Headlessness is characteristic of this series – the heads of the figures depicted are substituted for other images in order to portray the entry into a dream state.

=== Cartoons ===
Helander uses Cartoon elements in his collages to add comic spice to the iconographic level of meaning. The presence of these images is prominent enough to sway the tone towards popular imagery without becoming Pop Art itself, rather. Helander creates a tone pointing towards the eccentric and personal content found in small motifs.

=== Eccentric Landscapes ===
Helander makes use of map fragments and meteorological references to create collages that become veritable landscapes. These works capture the legends of travelers and explorers as they enriched the escapist dimension of the American dream.

=== Love Letters ===
In his series Love Letters, Helander reflects on his love for letterforms and a sense of humor with multiple meanings. The series centers the primary letterform and surrounds it in a nostalgic composition of vintage images and rich colors.

=== Commissions ===
Helander has taken commissions from the Norton Museum of Art, Dan Marino, and the World Federation of the United Nations Associations. Other commissions include works for Dale Chihuly and Cutrale.

From 1993 until 2000, Helander created custom collage illustrations for the New Yorker section Goings On About Town. Beginning in 2002 Helander contributed collage illustrations for Jazziz Magazine, including numerous covers and CD jacket designs. For 10 years, since its inception, Helander was commissioned by the Palm Beach International Film Festival to create limited edition film festival posters which became noteworthy amongst local attendees.

=== Curious Collage ===
In 1994 Robert Mahoney, art critic and contributor to ARTnews magazine, wrote the artist's book Curious Collage: Bruce Helander. Published by Grassfield Press, Curious Collage included and introduction by Henry Geldzahler, notable art critic, curator, and art historian.

=== The Art Economist ===
Helander was the editor-in-chief of The Art Economist, a publication that examined the contemporary art market. A critically informative publication serving as a constructive tool for art collectors, museums and galleries, The Art Economist was used to ascertain transparency of art value in the global contemporary art market.

== Curating ==
Helander acted as curator of Cuadro Fine Art Gallery, Dubai in 2007. Since 2012 Helander has served as a guest curator at ArtHouse429, Palm Beach. He has also served as guest curator of the Coral Springs Museum of Art.

== Exhibitions ==
His work is in over fifty museum collections, including the Metropolitan Museum of Art, Solomon R. Guggenheim Museum, Brooklyn Museum, Smithsonian, Art Institute of Chicago, Los Angeles County Museum of Art, San Francisco Museum of Modern Art, Whitney Museum of American Art and the Museum of Contemporary Art, Los Angeles.

== Recognition ==
Helander is a former White House fellow of the National Endowment for the Arts and has won the South Florida Cultural Consortium fellowship for professional achievement in the visual arts. In 2014 he was inducted to the Florida Artists Hall of Fame, Florida’s most prestigious arts and culture honor. City Link magazine called Bruce Helander “Arguably the most recognized and successful collage artist in the country.”

== Bibliography ==
- Curious Collage: Bruce Helander by Robert Mahoney. Miami: Grassfield Press, 1994
- Learning to See: An Artist's View on Contemporary Artists from Artschwager to Zakanitch by Bruce Helander. Lake Park: StarGroup International, 2008
- Bunnies by Hunt Slonem. New York: Glitterati Incorporated, 2015
- Key West: Changing Colors by J. Steven Manolis. Miami: J. Steven Manolis Art, 2016
- Chihuly: An Artist Collects by Bruce Helander. New York: Abrams Books, 2017
