= The Island (Buenos Aires) =

Exclusive sector in the neighbourhood of Recoleta in Buenos Aires,

Coordinates: 34°35′07″S 58°23′47″W

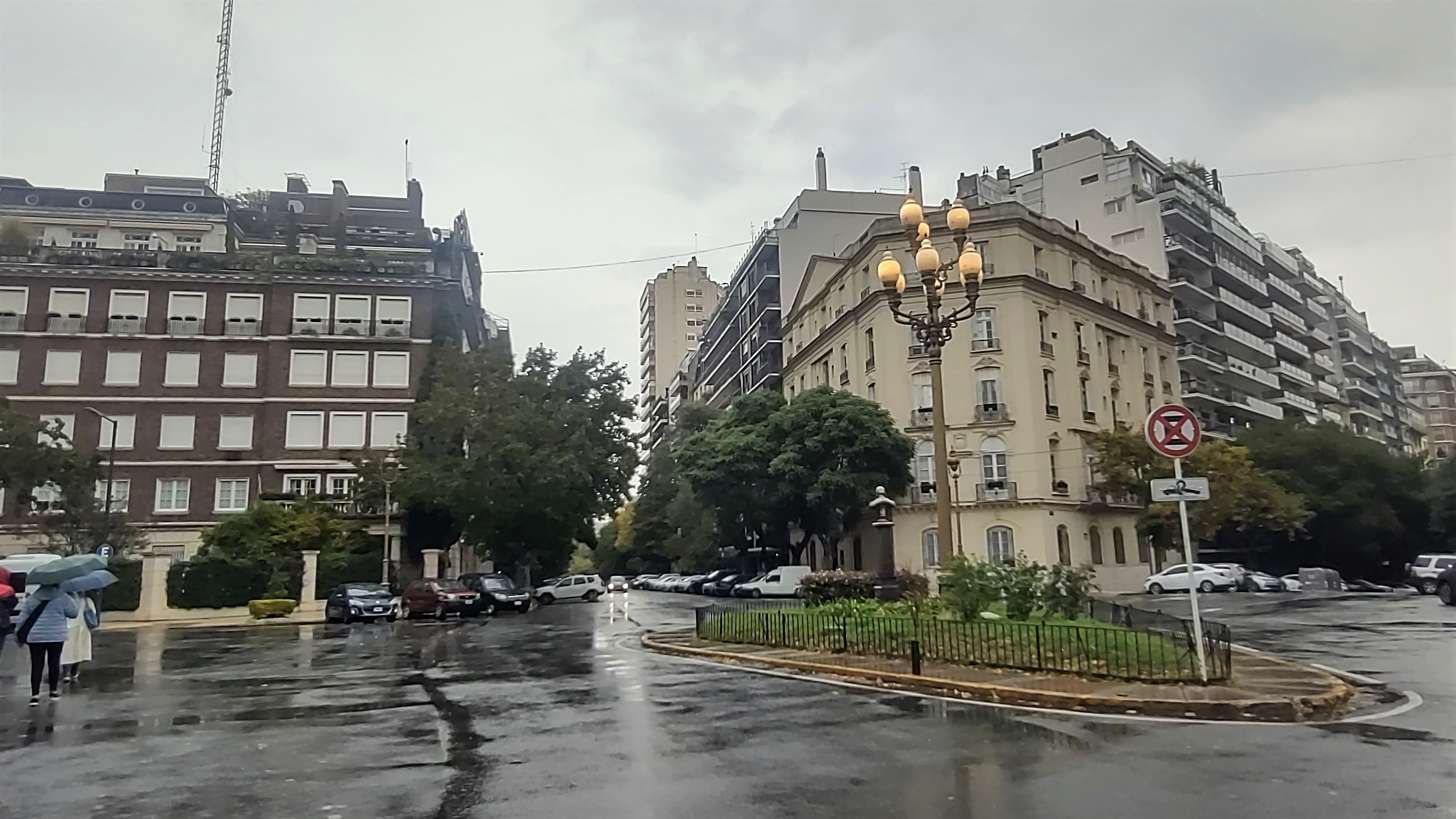
Gelly and Obes Square in La Isla, Buenos Aires

The Island (Spanish: La isla) is an exclusive sector in the neighbourhood of Recoleta in Buenos Aires, where prominent and wealthy families of the Argentine Upper Class have their homes.

== History ==
The land in which La isla now stands belonged to the Hale-Pearson family, the most famous of which was Samuel Brown Hale, an American rancher born in 1804, who relocated to Buenos Aires in 1830. Hale was the vice president of the Sociedad Rural and a collaborator of President of Argentina, Domingo Faustino Sarmiento.

After its owner's death, the land was bought by the Baring Brothers British bank. In 1905, the Mayor of Buenos Aires, Alberto Casares expropiated the land to build a residential neighbourhood of large homes surrounded by trees and a privileged location. Including a viewpoint to the Rio de la Plata from Plaza Mitre. The construction was in the hands of French architect Joseph Antoine Bouvard, he designed the neighbourhood to contain many staircases, terraces and esplanades, as well as diagonal streets to have a more Parisian appearance, instead of the traditional Spanish Colonial grid.

In 1908, the City Government started to sell the plots of La isla, which were bought by traditionally wealthy families of Argentina, such as the Gowland Moreno Family and the Álzaga Family.

== Buildings ==
La isla contains many important palaces, such as the Madero-Unzué Palace, built by English architects Walter Bassett-Smith and Bertie Collcutt, which is the present-day British Embassy.

The Unzué Palace, which was the residential palace of the president during the government of Juan Perón, used to stand in La isla. The Unzué Palace was a politically relevant landmark because Eva Perón passed away there. It was a symbol of Peronism, and for that reason, after the Coup d'Etat against Juan Perón's government, the Unzué Palace was demolished by the dictatorial government of Pedro Eugenio Aramburu. Now in that same plot lies the National Library of Argentina, one of the most notorious brutalist buildings of Buenos Aires, designed by Clorindo Testa.

== Gallery ==
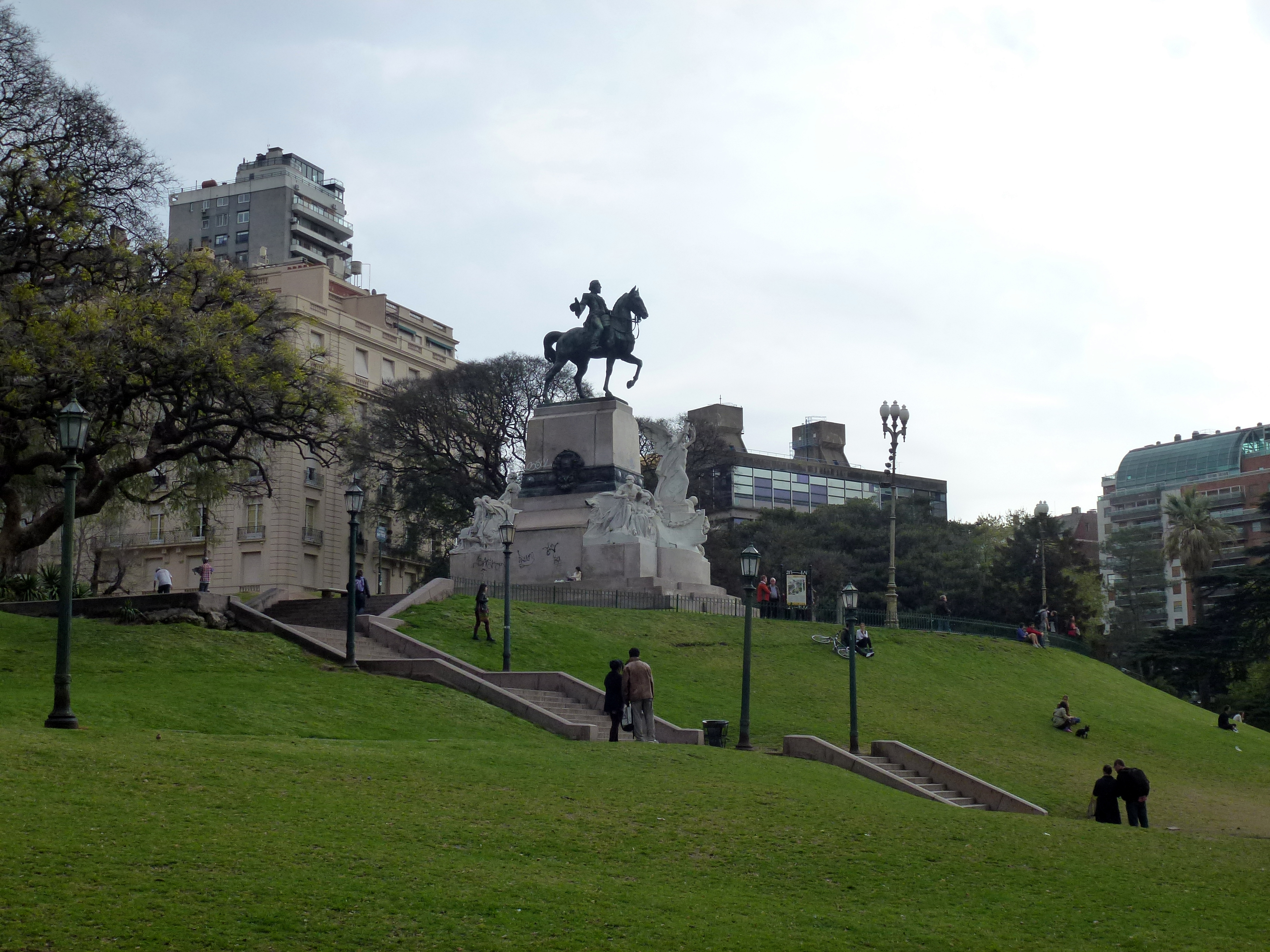
Monument to Bartolomé Mitre in Plaza Mitre

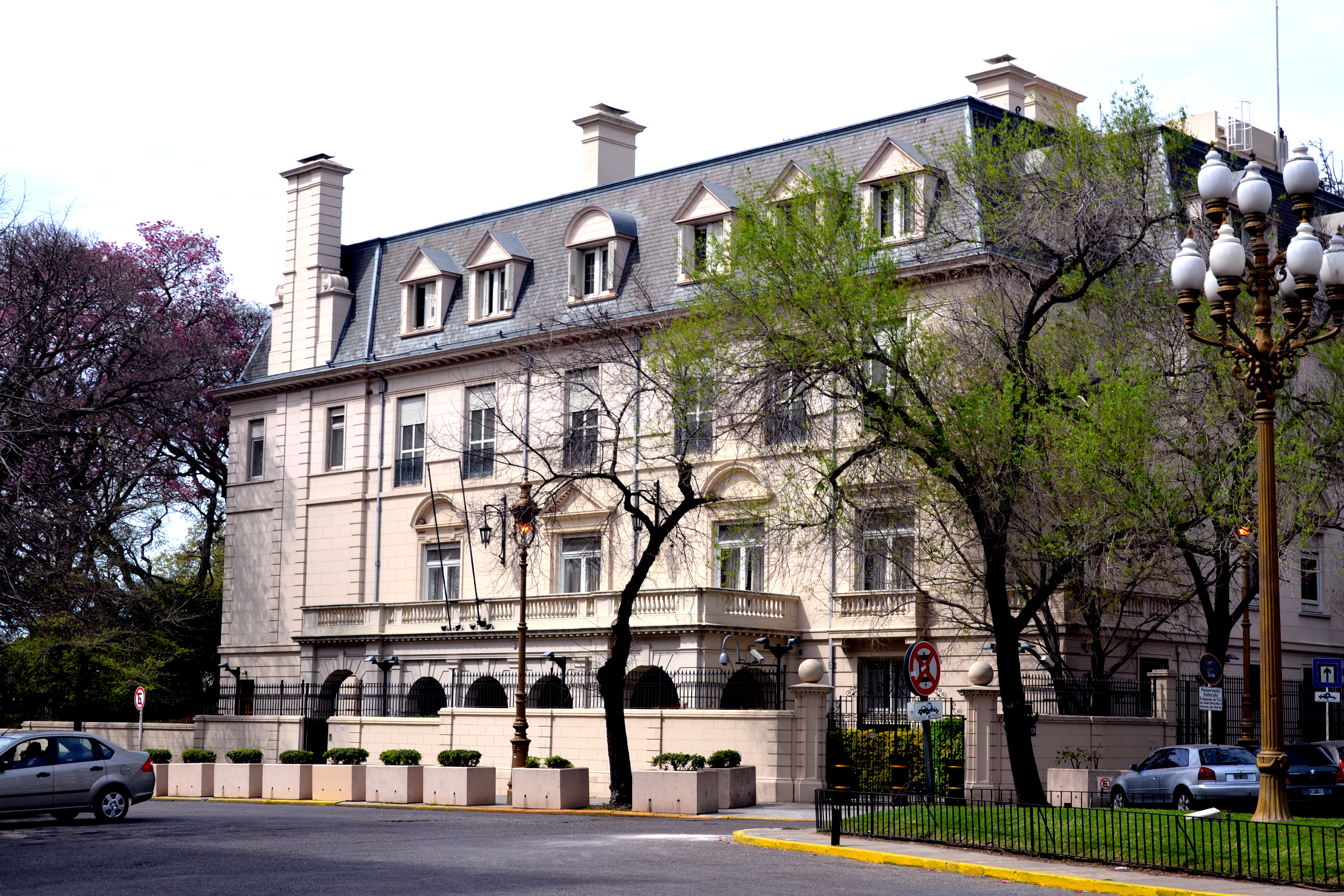
The Current Embassy of the United Kingdom in Argentina

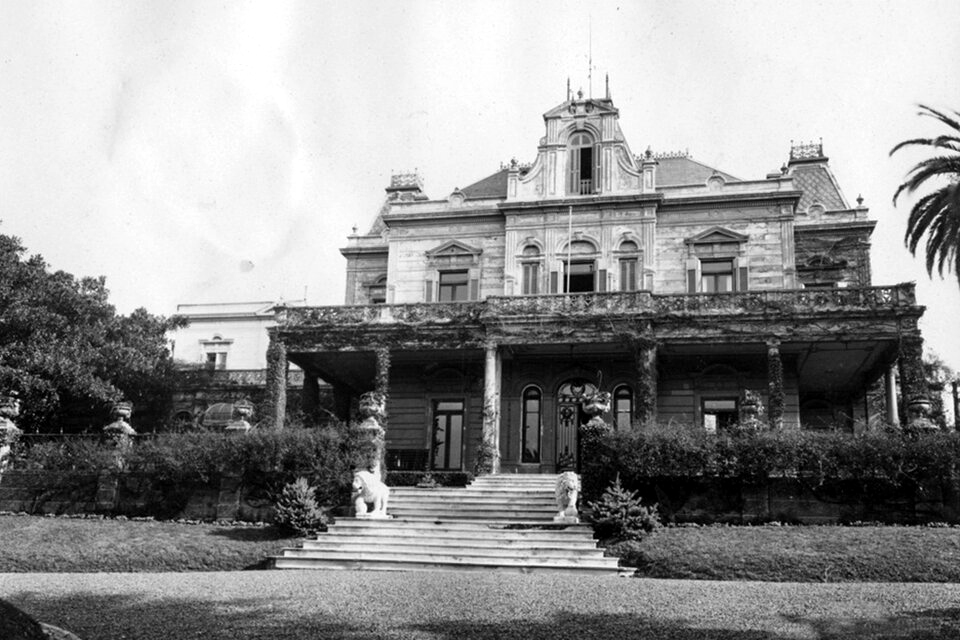
The Unzué Palace

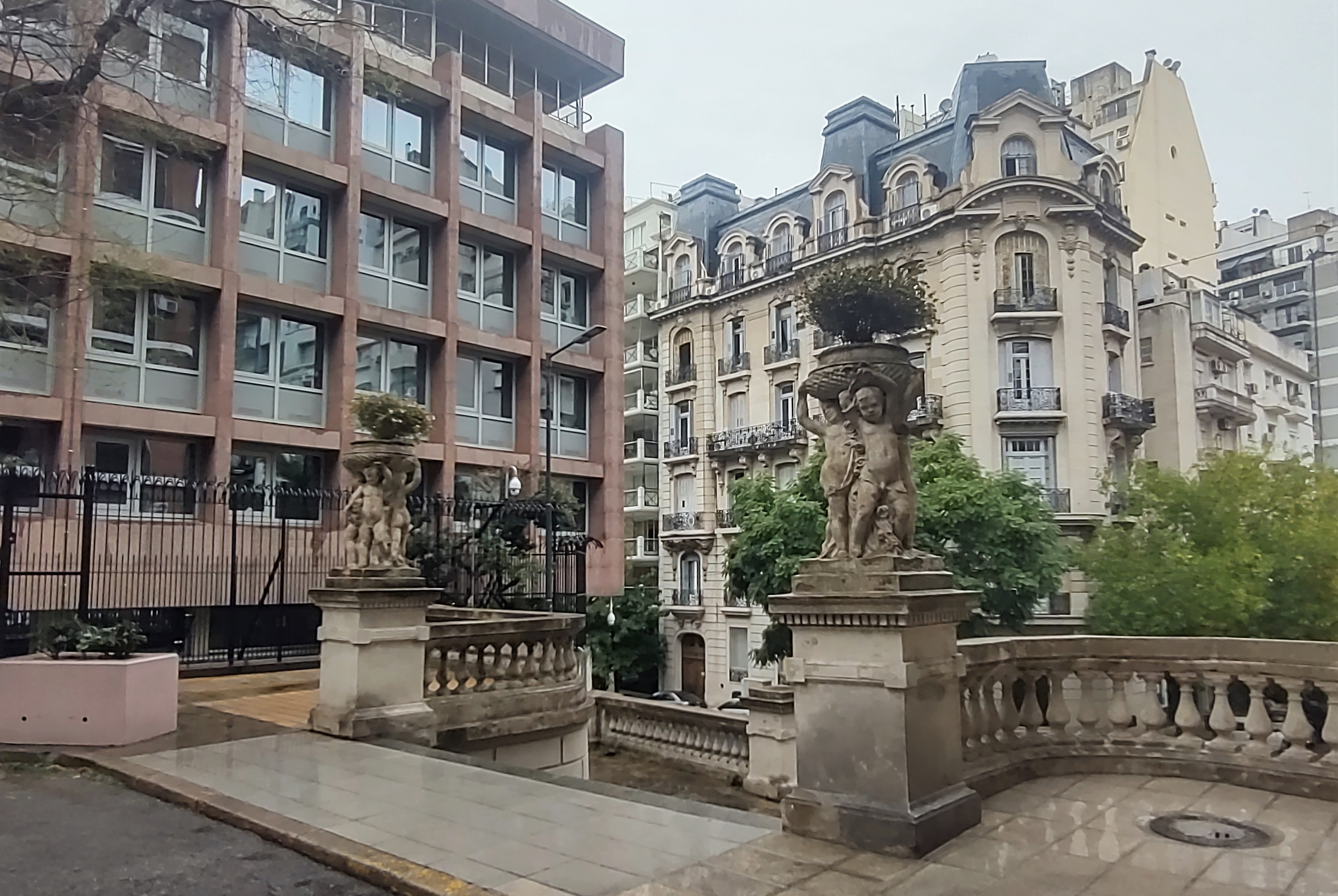
Staircase in La Isla

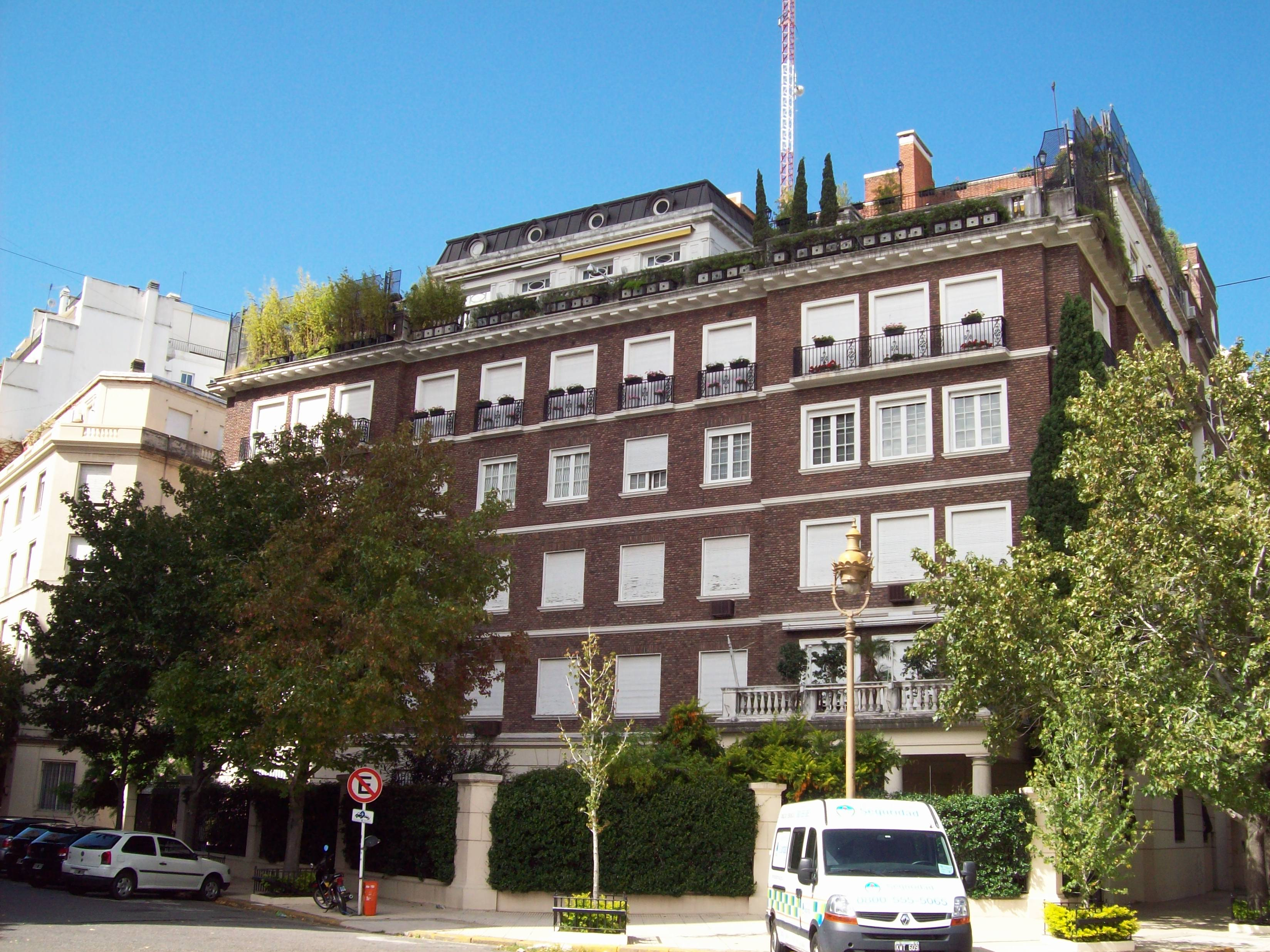
Residential building

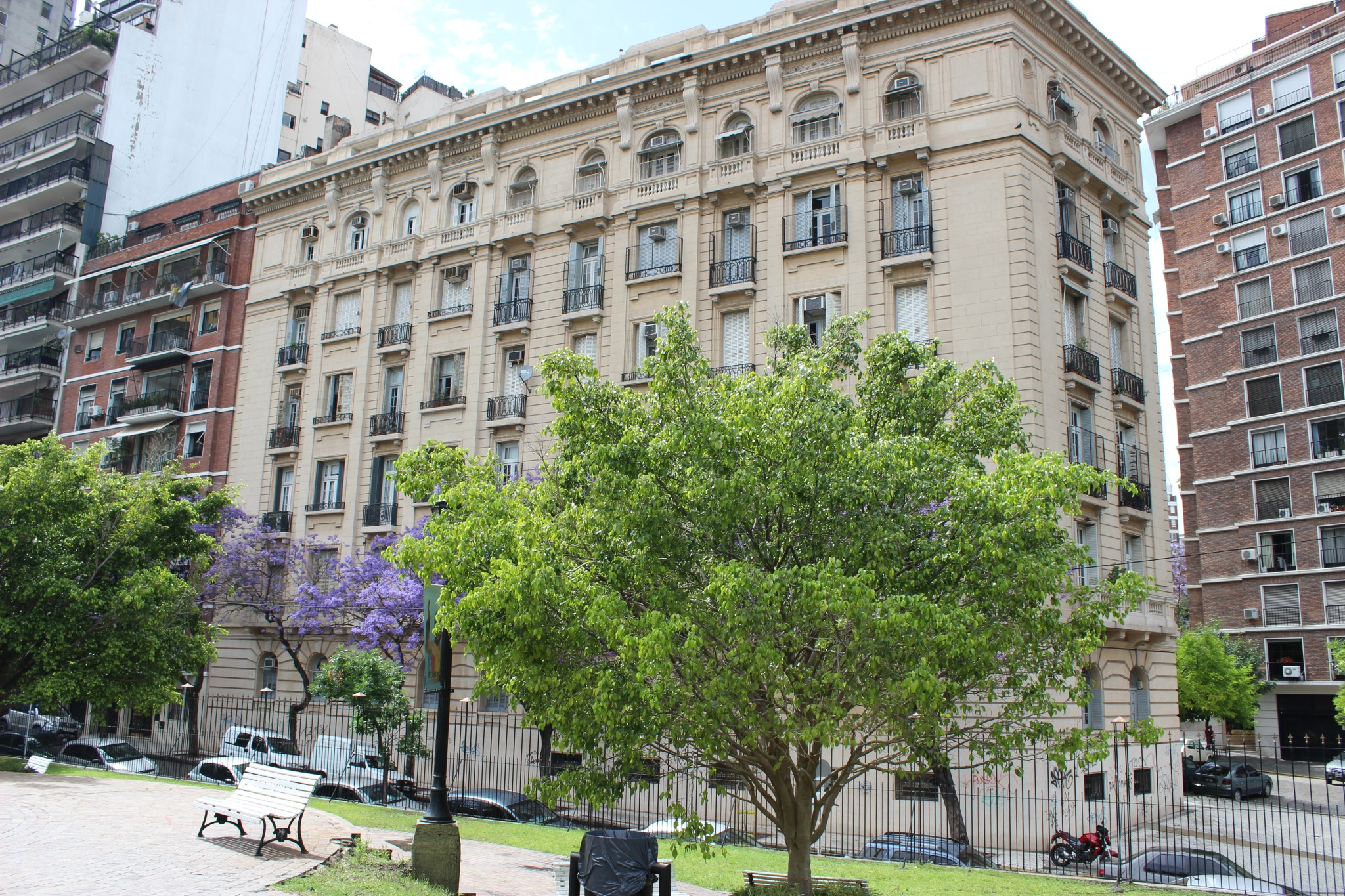
Residential building

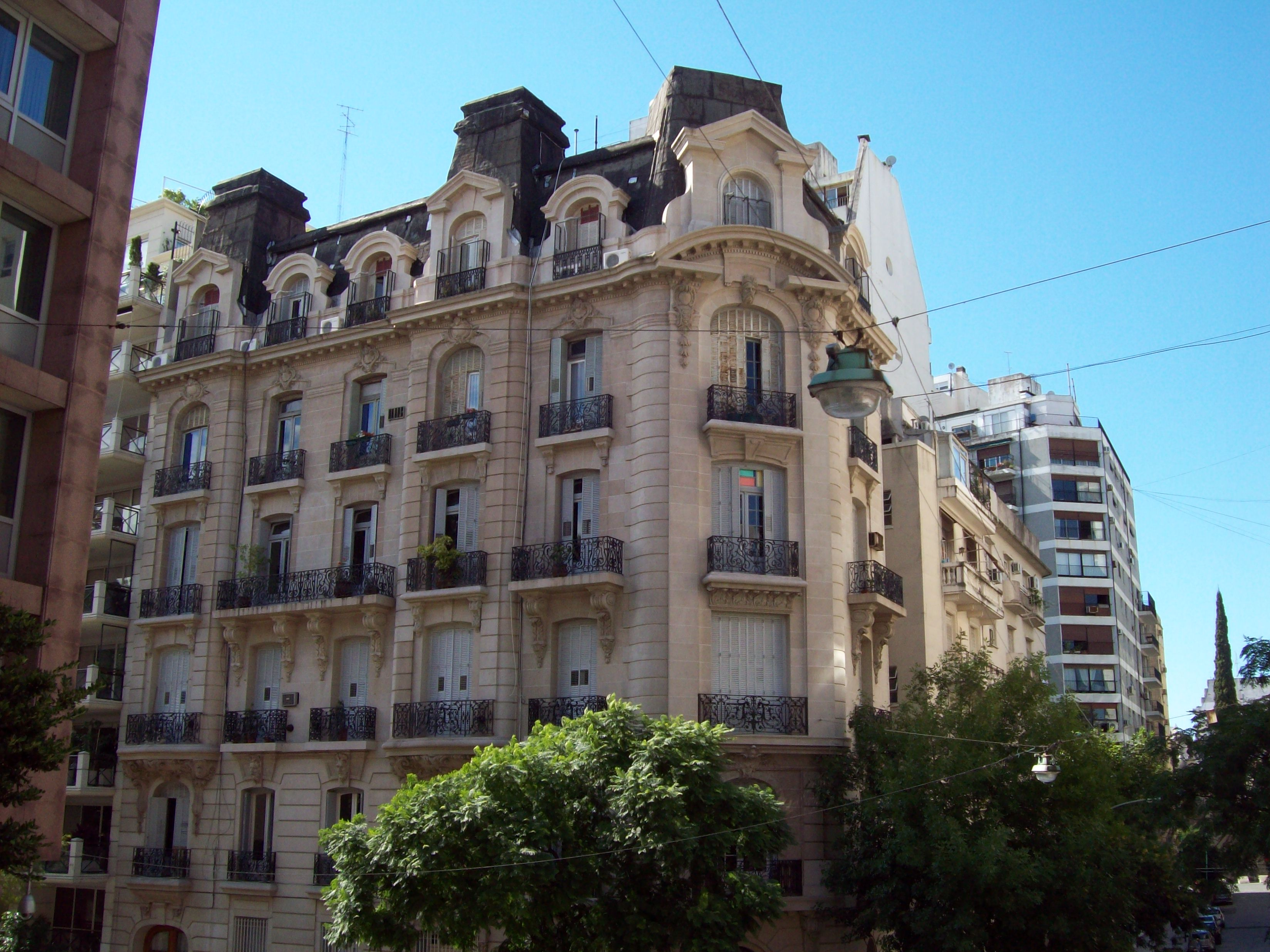
Residential building

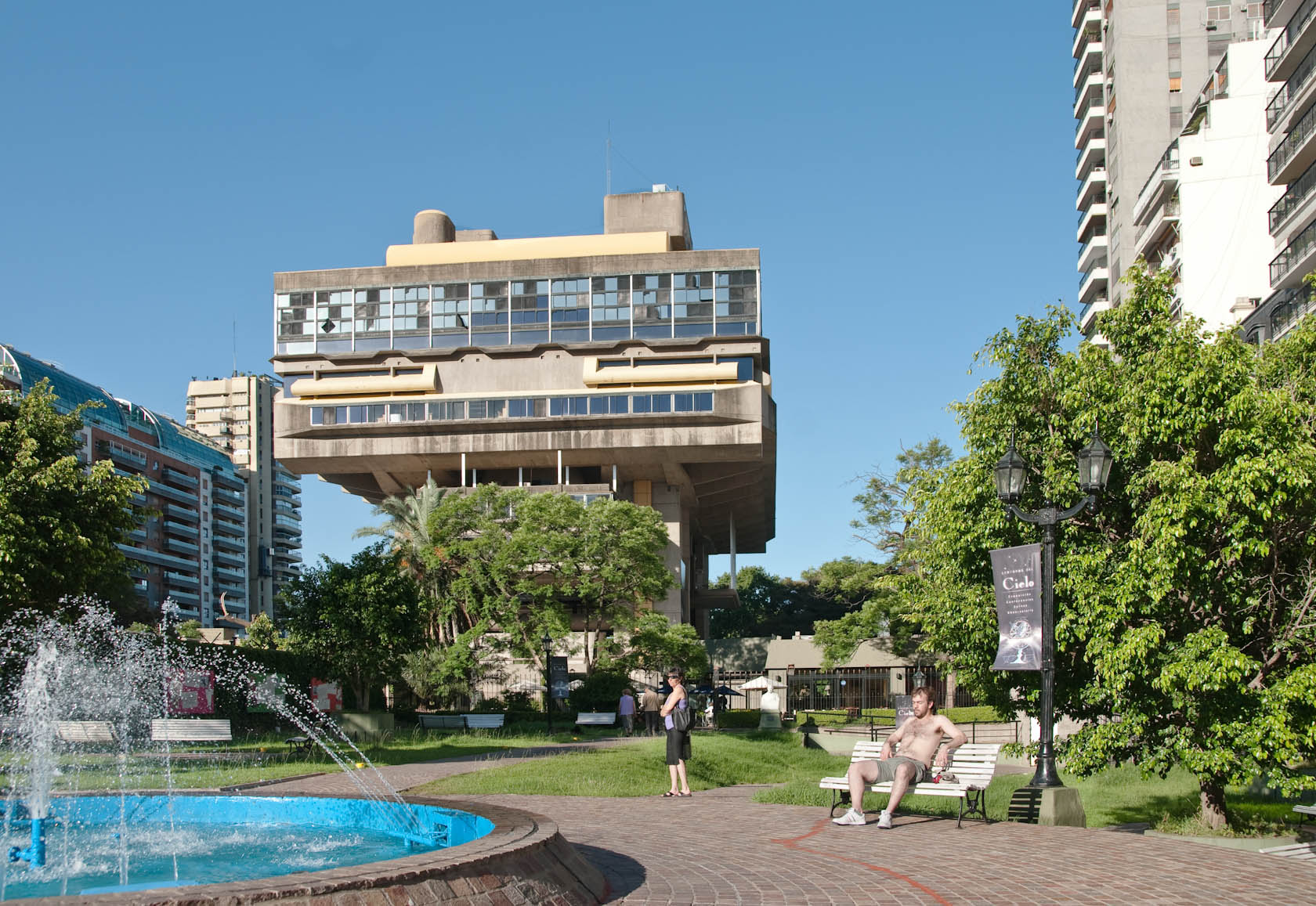
The National Library of Argentina
