= La Perla =

La perla may refer to:

- La Perla District, Peru
- La Perla, Veracruz, Mexico
- La Perla, San Juan, Puerto Rico, area of Old San Juan in Puerto Rico
  - Teatro La Perla, Ponce, Puerto Rico
- La Perla Spa, a building in Mar del Plata, Argentina
- La perla (film), a Mexican film of Steinbeck's novella The Pearl
- Hotel La Perla, a hotel in Pamplona, Spain
- La Perla (clothing), an Italian luxury lifestyle company established in 1954
- La Perla (painting), c. 1518 painting by Raphael

== Music ==
- La Perla (music group), from Colombia
- "La Perla", a song by Franz Liszt
- "La Perla" (Calle 13 song), a song by alternative-reggaeton duo Calle 13
- "La Perla", a song by Kobojsarna, 2010
- "La Perla" (Rosalía and Yahritza y su Esencia song), from Lux, 2025
- "La Perla", a song by Shea Couleé from 8, 2023
- La Perla, the nickname of ranchero singer, Malena Cano

== See also ==
- Perla (disambiguation)
- The Pearl (novella), by John Steinbeck
