= Unzué Palace =

Argentine palace

- Palacio Unzué
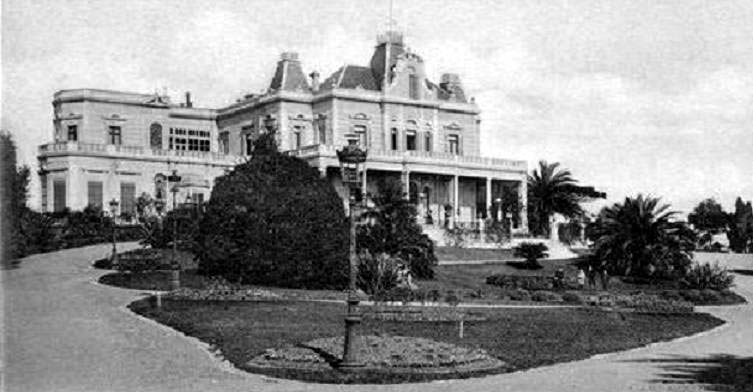
- The Unzué Palace circa 1900

- Location within Buenos Aires
- Alternative names: Quinta Unzué

General information
- Location: Avenida del Libertador, Austria, Agüero y Avenida Las Heras, Buenos Aires,, Argentina
- Coordinates: 34°35′04″S 58°23′53″W
- Completed: 1883
- Opened: 1887
- Demolished: 1958

Unzué Palace (Spanish: El palacio Unzué), also known as Quinta Unzué, was the presidential residence of the Argentine Republic located in Buenos Aires during the presidency of Juan Domingo Perón (1946–1955), and became a place of pilgrimage and cult after the death of Eva Perón in 1952. The building's symbolic importance was such that, after the military coup that led to Perón's downfall in 1955, the dictators who subsequently took power ordered its complete demolition, to erase all traces of its former occupants.

The residence occupied a large plot of almost three blocks with tree-lined gardens. It was located between Avenida del Libertador, Austria, Agüero, and Avenida Las Heras. Following its destruction, the National Library of Argentina was constructed between 1962 and 1992.

== History ==
=== Construction and early history ===
The history of Unzué Palace is documented from the end of the Juan Manuel de Rosas government (1835–1852), when three Englishmen purchased land for the construction of a summer home. The politician Manuel de Arrotea and his wife, Josefa Vivot, lived in the property for a time. In 1855 the land passed to Mariano Saavedra, son of Cornelio Saavedra, the president of the Primera Junta. He then constructed his own residence on the site, where he held many meetings as Governor of Buenos Aires Province. At this time, the Recoleta neighbourhood was a marginal and semi-rural corner of Buenos Aires, which still only extended to the current Avenida Callao. As such, Saavedra's property was difficult to reach.

Between 1883 and 1887, the house was acquired by Mariano Unzué and his wife Mercedes Baudrix. This was a time of significant growth in Buenos Aires and brought unprecedented gains for traditional agricultural producing families like the Unzués, and as such Mariano was able to build the Unzué Palace as a great rest residence for his family, alternating between his main home in Calle Florida. Signed plans from the early 1900s confirm that the family hired the architects Martín Vismara and A. Gonsalez to manage building renovation work.

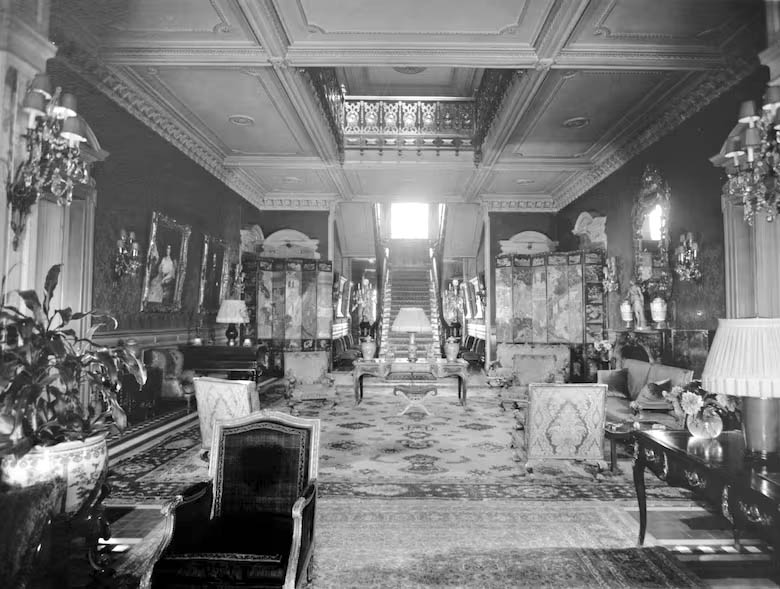
View of the Unzué Palace's great hall and staircase, 1920s

In 1910, during the Centennial International Exposition, Unzué was used as the main site for the Exhibition of Health & Hygiene, which showcased several technical advances of the time including the flushing toilet, new sewer systems, and medical instruments. The Great Depression of 1930 affected the Argentine agricultural export model significantly, and those families who had benefited now lost both income and power, which led to many being forced to sell their residences. In January 1937, the Chamber of Deputies approved the expropriation of the Unzué estate, a measure opposed by Deputy Enrique Dickman, who considered it a method of economic salvation for families in crisis. The Argentine state therefore purchased Unzué Palace in 1937 to pay off debts, and expropriated the building and its parkland of some 21,154.0345 m^{2}, converting them into the presidential residence. In 1938, the president Roberto Marcelino Ortiz decided to found a Garden of Childhood (Jardín de Infancia), moving the school faculty to the site. The building underwent remodeling until 1942, including adaptations for its function as a Garden of Childhood. However, by December 1942, under the presidency of Ramón Castillo, plans were drawn up to revert its use to that of presidential residence. It wasn't used extensively by presidents however, the first to do so being Edelmiro Farrell, who occasionally resided there on weekends away from the main presidential palace located in downtown Buenos Aires.

=== The Perón era ===
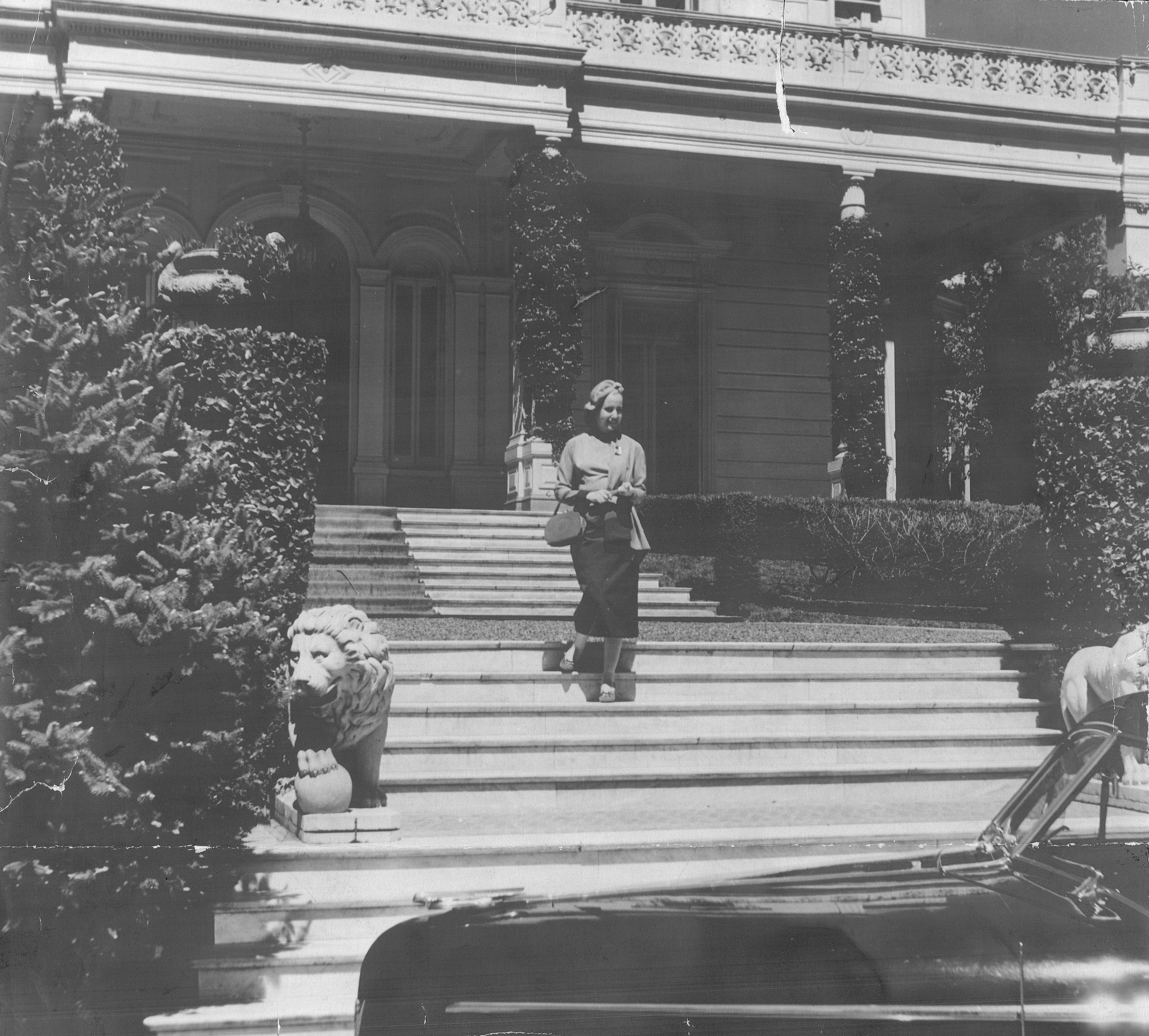
Eva Perón leaving the Unzué Palace in 1946

The first president to use the building regularly was Juan Domingo Perón, elected in 1946, who made it his permanent residence. In doing so he moved further away from the capital's centre to the more residential neighbourhood of Recoleta, which also gave him easy and quick access to the Casa Rosada. The ground floor was not heavily used. Perón and Evita moved into the first floor, where they had their main and guest bedrooms, dressing rooms, a library, an office, a small dining room, and servants' quarters. A marble «Y» shaped staircase led to upstairs wings to the left and right of the building, which looked out onto a balcony from where you could observe the entire ground floor. A lift was also located on the other side of the property, between the library and the golden hall.

Once her cancer prevented her from travelling to offices in the Legislature Palace where her foundation was based, Eva Perón worked from the Palace, and granted interviews. She ultimately passed away there on 26 July 1952. During her convalescence, many of her supporters gathered at the palace gates, leaving images, candles, and letters. After her death, the building acquired a mythical status while Perón continued to live there. He remained in Unzué until his overthrow in 1955 by the Revolución Libertadora, when the property was set alight under suspicious circumstances. On 16 September 1955, during aerial bombing, an explosive device landed near Unzué, but it fell in the palace gardens and failed to destroy the property. In the days following the coup d'état, it was set alight and looted by military figures close to the uprising.

=== Demolition and National Library of Argentina ===
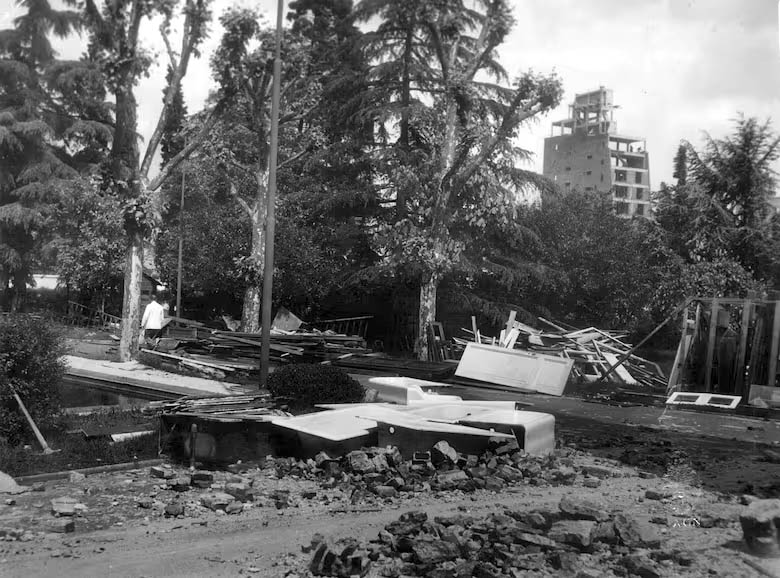
The demolition of Palacio Unzué, 1956

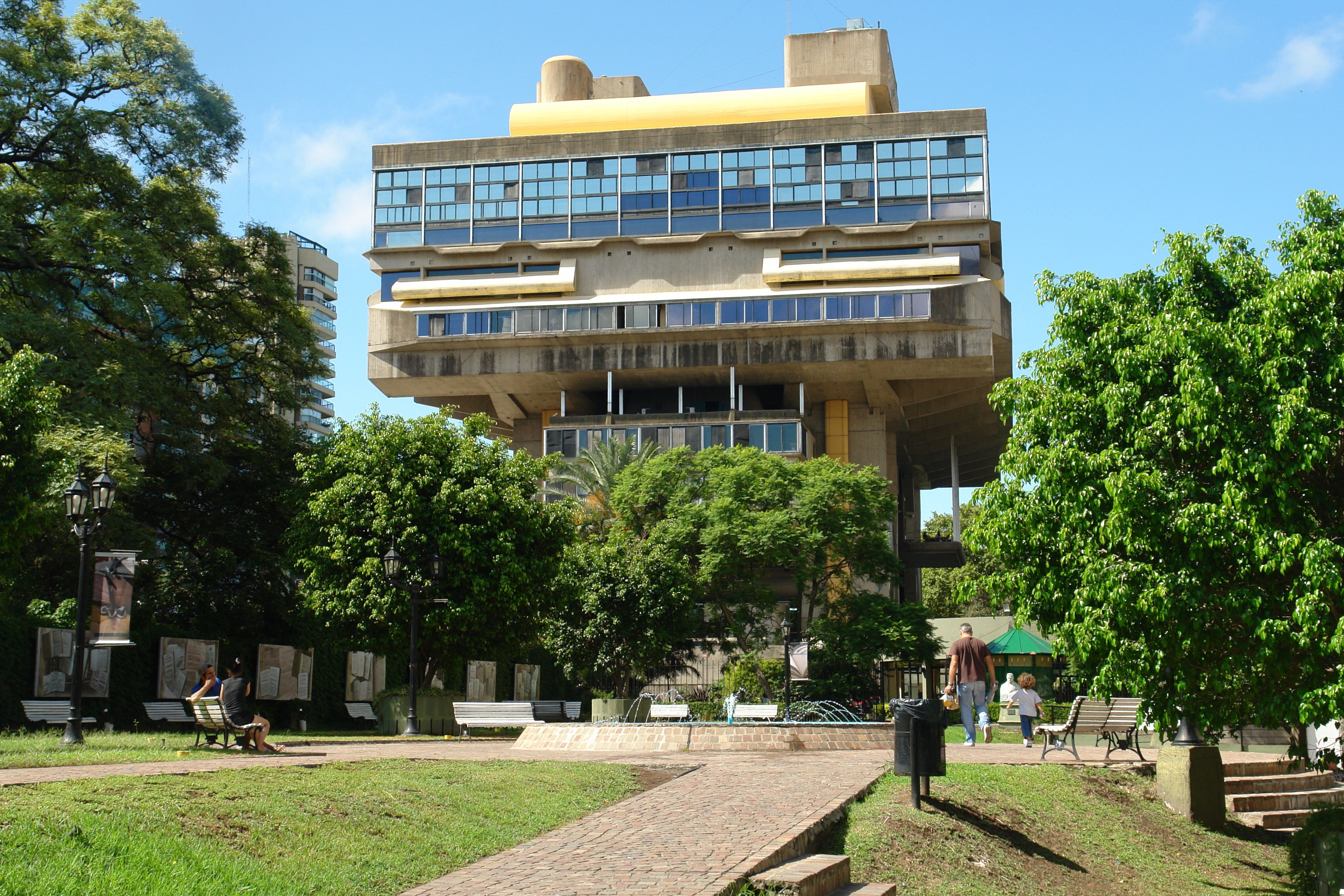
National Library of Argentina as viewed from Plaza del Lector

In 1956, General Pedro Eugenio Aramburu took control of Argentina, a dictator and enemy of Perón. He decided that Unzué should be completely demolished in 1958, supported by Decree Law 4161, which prohibited Peronist symbolism and any allusions to Perón and his second wife. Decree 14.576, signed by Aramburu, stated that:

...The operating costs and necessary repairs to be carried out on the aforementioned property exceed the sum of one million seven hundred thousand pesos in national currency, an investment that would not be proportional to the intrinsic value of the building; while it is true that in previous times it has served as the Presidential Residence, it is no longer possible to carry out new renovations or adapt it from a functional and architectural standpoint to meet the minimum characteristics that a property intended for the accommodation of the President of the Republic must offer....

Aramburu was the first ruling Argentine leader to use the Quinta de Olivos as a presidential residence, which it continues to be to the present day. With the return to democracy under Arturo Frondizi, he drove the construction of the National Library of Argentina on the site of Unzué. The project to design the library was decided through a contest in 1962, ultimately won by Clorindo Testa, Francisco Bullrich, and Alicia Cazzaniga. Work progressed slowly, and the building was finally opened to the public by Carlos Menem in 1992. In the library's lobby, several bronze plaques recognize both Eva Perón and the demolition of Unzué Palace, as an attempt to erase a part of Argentina's history. A statue of Evita's image stands in the building's gardens on the corner of Avenida del Libertador and Austria.

== Architecture ==
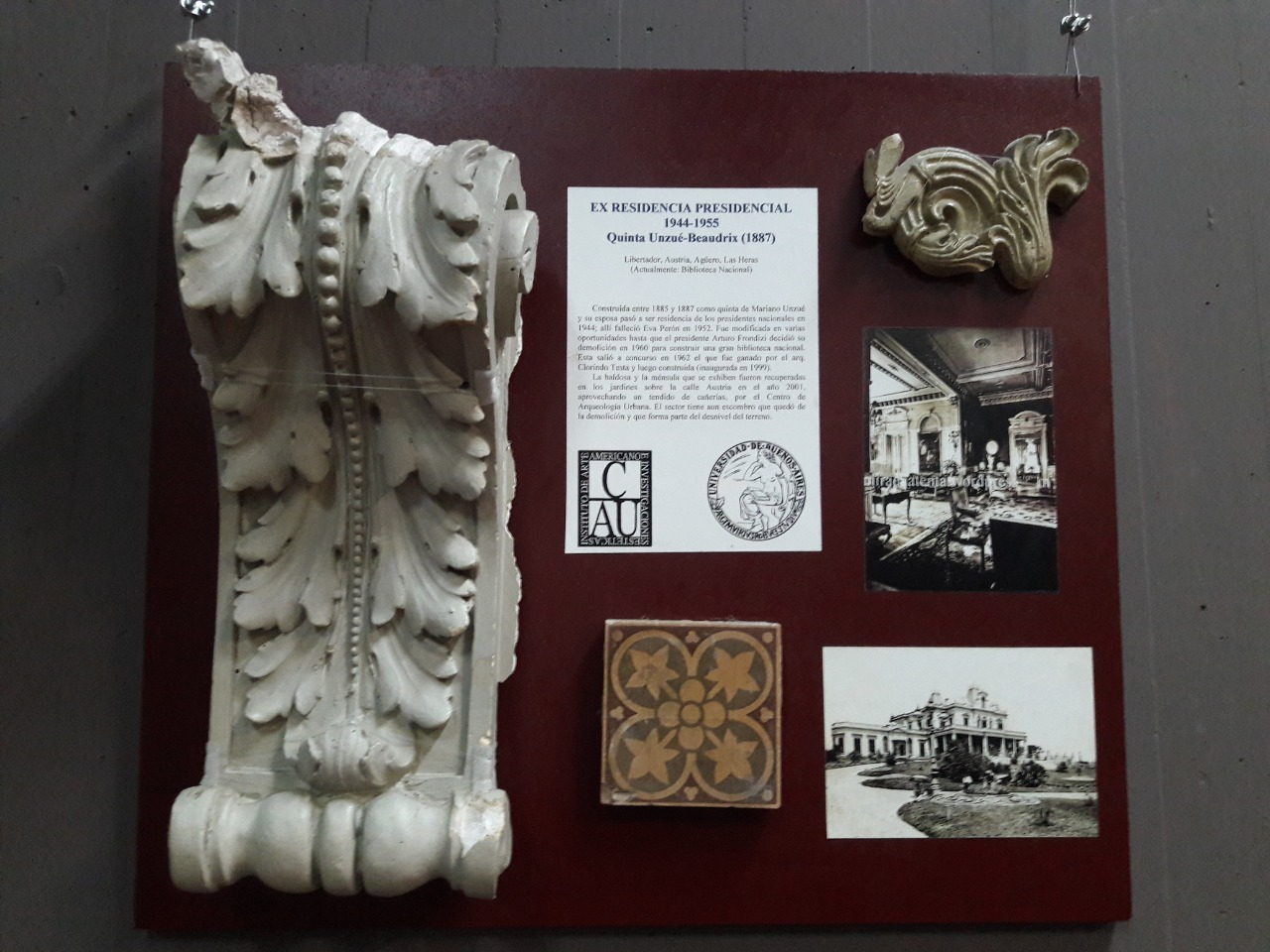
Original fragments of the Unzué Palace

The Unzué Palace was characteristic of aristocratic family residences in Buenos Aires at the end of the nineteenth century. Built in the 1880s, it was an example of the French academic style, which was popular within high society at the time. Occupying a significant site above a steep bank or barranca, with elevated gardens that descended northward, the building overlooked the current Avenida del Libertador and bordered Calle Agüero, where the ancillary functions were located. As in other high similar society residences of the time, it was built from high quality materials, including French metalwork, Italian marble, oak floors, drinking water through the use of sand filters and modern electrics. The building's façade included a slated mansard roof, popular in French architecture, and a columned entrance gallery guarding the main entrance and lower floor, accessed through a marble staircase. In 1942, the ramp was demolished and replaced with a pine and cedarwood staircase, reflecting the original style of the building. Two rooms were joined to create a library, whose walls were lined with light walnut wood panelling and shelving, and an included a veined marble fireplace. A wall was built to separate the salon, adorned with two alcoves, a chandelier, crystal wall lights, and Louis XV French furnishings.

As the Unzué Quinta was the official residence of the President of the Nation, it required facilities to house the Granaderos Regiment, responsible for the President's security, and garages for the vehicles that transported him. For this purpose, the old service quarters located behind the residence were adapted into barracks for the troops and a presidential garage.

=== Gardens ===
The garden design has been variously attributed to both Carlos Thays and Rubén Darío, although neither name has ever been proved. It occupied 21.154 m^{2}, and was surrounded by Avenida Libertador and Austria and Agüero streets. It contained a wide variety of plant species, including magnolias and araucaria, cedar, chestnut, fig, orange, and palm trees, in addition to a lake and a planned aviary. It also had curved pathways, fountains, palm trees and iron lamposts. Situated on higher ground above a steep bank or barranca, entry to the residence from the street was through the gardens.

== Current Status ==
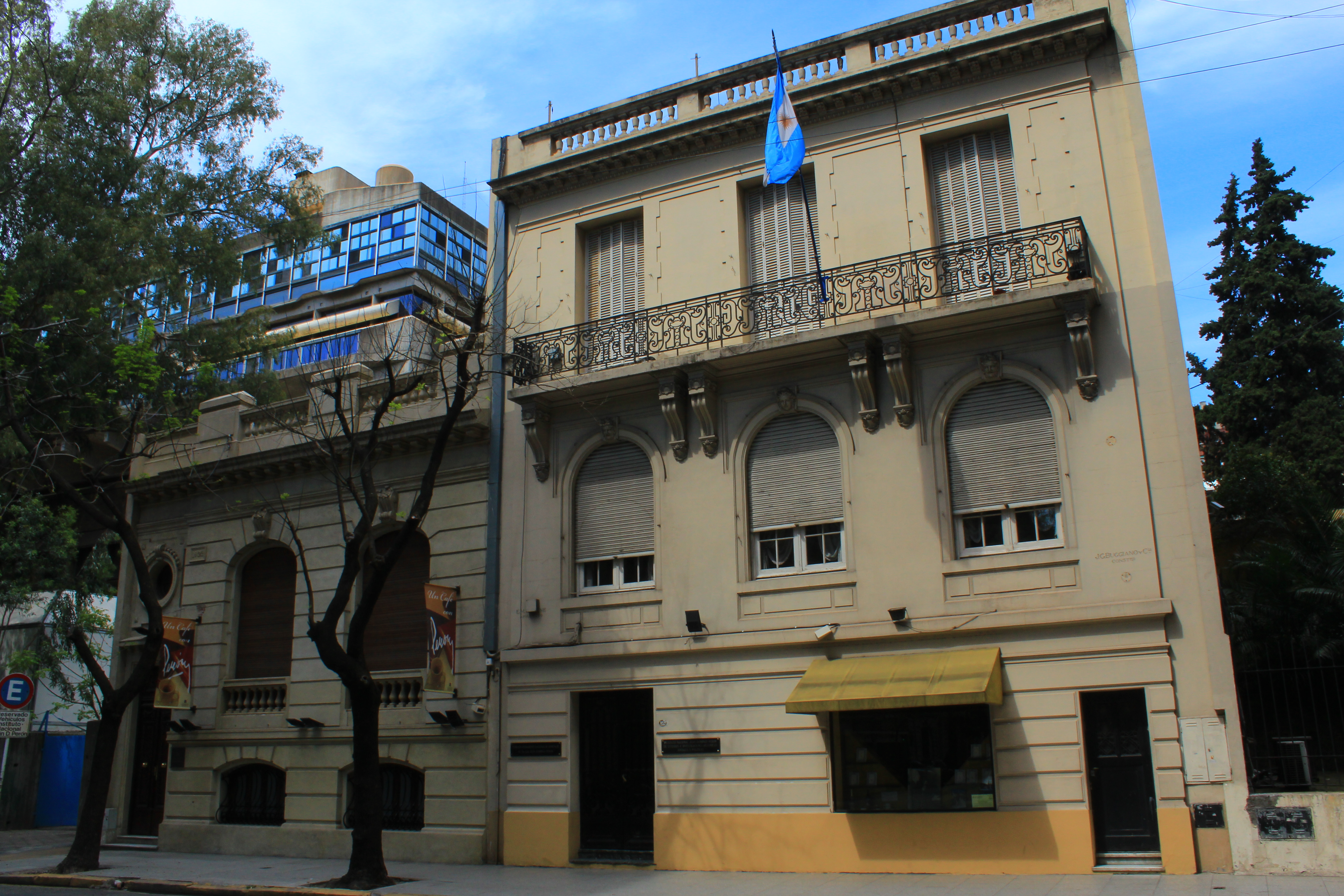
Instituto Juan Domingo Perón, with the National Library in background

Today, the only remaining parts of the building are the Instituto Nacional Juan Domingo Perón (Juan Domingo Perón National Institute), formerly the butlers quarters, and the headquarters of the Coro Polifónico Nacional de Ciegos (National Polyphonic Choir for the Blind), previously the third Transitional Home of the Eva Perón Foundation, both located on Calle Austria. Additionally, the Faculty of Architecture, Design and Urbanism (FADU) houses fragments of the original Unzué Palacio. The National Library houses a structure called the Memory Lookout, an octagonal glass building that houses a two-level model of the palace, created by the artist Daniel Santoro. Some of the statues from the palace gardens were relocated to Lezama Park in the San Telmo district of Buenos Aires.

== See also ==
- Casa Rosada
- Quinta de Olivos
- National Library of Argentina
