= Alicia Cazzaniga =

Argentine architect (1928–1968)

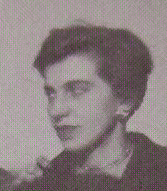
- Born: July 9, 1928; Buenos Aires
- Died: February 28, 1968 (aged 39); Buenos Aires

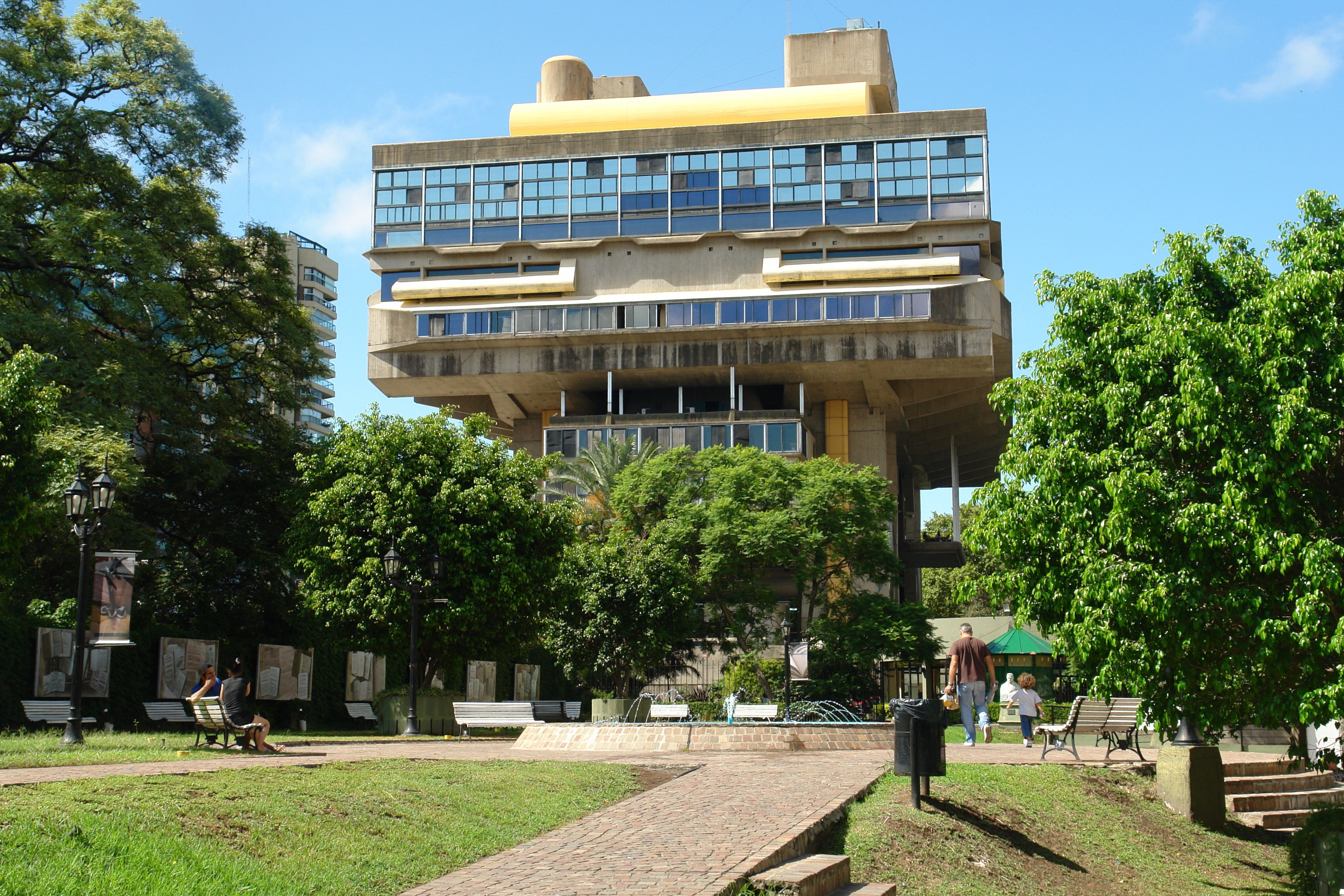
National Library of the Argentine Republic by Cazzaniga

Alicia Cazzaniga (1928–1968) was an Argentine modernist architect. She is best known for her work in designing the National Library of the Argentine Republic.

Alicia Cazzaniga was born in Buenos Aires on July 9, 1928. She attended the National University of Buenos Aires where she studied with Francisco Bullrich and Eduardo Polledo and Horacio Baliero.

Cazzaniga, along with Bullrich, Polledo, Bailero and others founded the Organization of Modern Architecture (Spanish: Organización de Arquitectura Moderna) in 1948. The group practiced Rationalism, forming contacts with members of the Bauhaus.

In 1962, a design produced by Cazzaniga along with Francisco Bullrich, and Clorindo Testa was chosen for the new building of the National Library of the Argentine Republic.

Alicia Cazzaniga died on February 28, 1968, in Buenos Aires.
