= Capotesta House =

Casa Capotesta

General information
- Type: House
- Location: Buriquetas Norte Street, Pinamar Partido, Argentina
- Construction started: 1983
- Completed: 1985

Design and construction
- Architect: Clorindo Testa

Casa Capotesta is a house in Pinamar Partido, a coastal resort in the province of Buenos Aires, Argentina. It was designed in 1983 by the architect Clorindo Testa, who was a prominent member of the Argentine rationalist movement and one of the pioneers of brutalist architecture there. He designed the house for himself, as a summer residence. The name of the house is a play on capo, Italian for "head" or "leader", and the surname of the (Italian born) architect.

The house is situated about 200 metres from the beach. The house is a large central cube with three rectangular shapes protruding out at odd angles creating striking angular geometries. Testa's architecture of that period is said to have acquired a more reflective, poetically human dimension.
