= La Tumbona House =

Casa La Tumbona

General information
- Type: House
- Location: Ostende, Pinamar Partido, Argentina
- Construction started: 1986/1989

Design and construction
- Architect: Clorindo Testa

Casa La Tumbona is a house on the beach in Ostende, a coastal resort in Pinamar Partido in the province of Buenos Aires, Argentina. It was designed in 1986 by the architect Clorindo Testa, who is a prominent member of the Argentine rationalist movement and one of the pioneers of brutalist architecture there and the architects Juan Genoud and Elena Acquarone. The house is elevated on pillars and located so close to the sea that the waves at times can wash underneath the house. This can create an illusion of being aboard a ship, as only water can be seen from the windows facing the sea.

The verb tumbar in Spanish means to fold or overturn, and can be used for waves that roll in from the sea. The noun tumbona can refer to a foldable beach chair.

The house is made of concrete, with distinct cubic forms, and striking angular geometries - all painted red.
