= Perla =

Perla may refer to:

== Arts and entertainment ==
- Perla (film), 2025 film directed by Alexandra Makárová
- Perla (2026 film), 2026 film
- Perla (TV series), 1998 Mexican series
- Perla (zarzuela), an 1871 zarzuela by Miguel Marqués and Juan José Herranz
- Perła, Polish title of Edyta Górniak's album Invisible

== Places ==
- Perla, Arkansas, a town in the United States
- Perla, Kasaragod, a village in Kerala
- Perła, Lesser Poland Voivodeship, a village in Poland
- Perla gas field, an offshore gas field in Venezuela

== People ==
- Perla (drag queen), Canadian drag queen
- Perla (singer) (born 1952), Paraguayan-Brazilian singer
- Perla Batalla (born 1961), Mexican-American singer
- Perla Serfaty (born 1944), Moroccan-Born French and Canadian sociologist

== Vessels ==
- Italian submarine Perla
- Perla-class submarine, Italian 1930s

== Other uses ==
- Perla (stonefly), a genus of stoneflies in the family Perlidae
- Perła, a beer made by Browary Lubelskie

== See also ==
- —includes several people with forename Perla
- —includes several people with surname or forename Perla
- Pearl (disambiguation)
- La Perla (disambiguation)
- Perlla (born 1988), Brazilian singer
- PERRLA and PERLA, medical abbreviations
