= Bank of London and South America building =

Bank of London and South America
- Banco de Londres y América del Sur (Spanish)
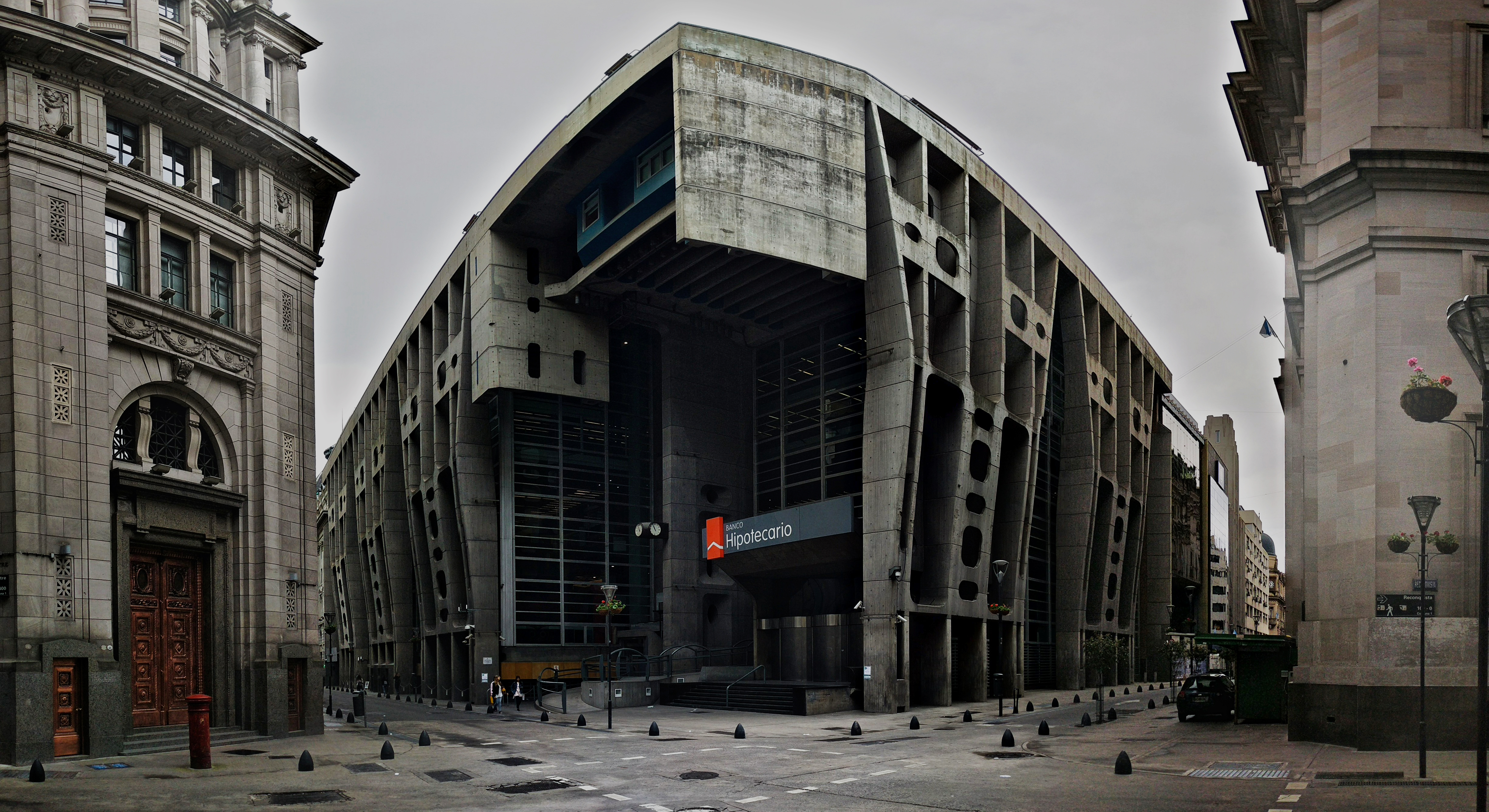
- View of the building at the intersection of Reconquista and Bartolomé Mitre streets.
- Interactive map of the Bank of London and South America area
- Alternative names: Banco Hipotecario

General information
- Architectural style: Brutalism
- Location: Reconquista 101–157, San Nicolás, Buenos Aires, Argentina
- Coordinates: 34°36′23″S 58°22′19″W
- Construction started: 15 December 1962
- Inaugurated: August 1966
- Owner: Banco Hipotecario

Design and construction
- Architects: Clorindo Testa and SEPRA (Santiago Sánchez Elía, Federico Peralta Ramos and Alfredo Agostini)
- Main contractor: Crivelli, Cuenya y Goycos Construcciónes S.A.

National Historic Monument of Argentina
- Designated: 2 December 1999

The Bank of London and South America (Spanish: Banco de Londres y América del Sur), or simply Bank of London (Banco de Londres), is an iconic building in downtown Buenos Aires, Argentina that originally served as the headquarters of the British institution of the same name and today houses the national Banco Hipotecario. It is located at the intersection of Reconquista and Bartolomé Mitre streets, in the heart of the Microcentro banking district and within the official neighborhood (Spanish: barrio) of San Nicolás, roughly 150 meters from the Casa Rosada. The building was constructed following a competition organized by the Bank of London in early 1960 and is located on the same site that had been occupied by its headquarters since 1869, with the aim of renovating its facilities on the eve of the centenary of its establishment in Buenos Aires. The contest was won by the SEPRA firm, formed by architects Santiago Sánchez Elía, Federico Peralta Ramos and Alfredo Agostini, with a design by young architect and visual artist Clorindo Testa.

An example of the post–World War II Brutalist movement, the building stands out from its 19th-century Beaux-Arts surroundings through its exposed and unconventional concrete structural system, and has been internationally recognized as one of the most significant works of Argentine and global architecture of its period. Testa's design follows no traditional canon and redefined the conventions of bank architecture in Argentina.

In 2016, architecture critic Rowan Moore ranked the Bank of London fourth on his list of "The 10 best concrete buildings" for The Guardian, noting that Testa "wasn't particularly interested in getting concrete to look light, at least from the outside, instead heaving it out of the ground into an extraordinary structure that has something of a dinosaur's skeleton." Moore further noted the building "still manages to achieve a civilised rapport with the neo-classical facades around it" and "also forms a perforated carapace that filters sunlight to the interior and creates both enclosure and openness", which "unexpectedly ends up having some of the qualities of a Japanese screen, if with considerable added tonnage."

== See also ==
- List of Brutalist structures
