= Calle Agüero =

Street in Buenos Aires, Argentina

Coordinates: 34.59515°S 58.40935°W

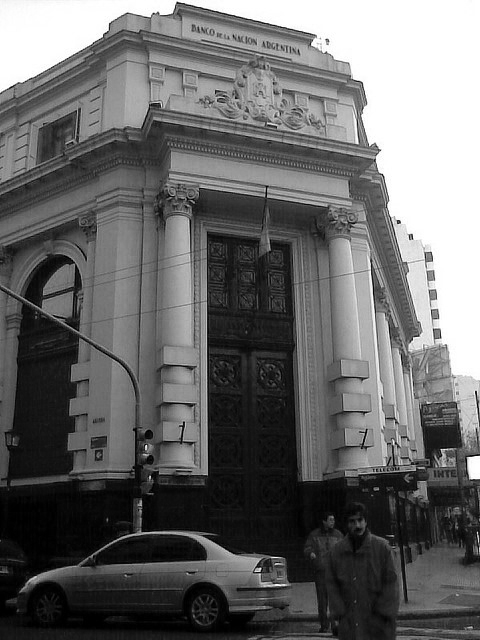
Corrientes and Agüero intersection

Agüero Street is an artery road of the City of Buenos Aires and crosses the neighborhoods of Recoleta and Balvanera.

== Overwiew ==
The street starts in Rivadavia Avenue, Balvanera, where it crosses the Sarmiento commuter rail line 500 meters from the Once railway station.

It is the entrance of the Abasto Shopping centre and Line Agüero station of the Buenos Aires Underground. The road ends at the Recoleta neighborhood as it crosses Avenida del Libertador.
