= National Library of Argentina =

Coordinates: 34°35′04″S 58°23′53″W

National Library Mariano Moreno
- Biblioteca Nacional Mariano Moreno

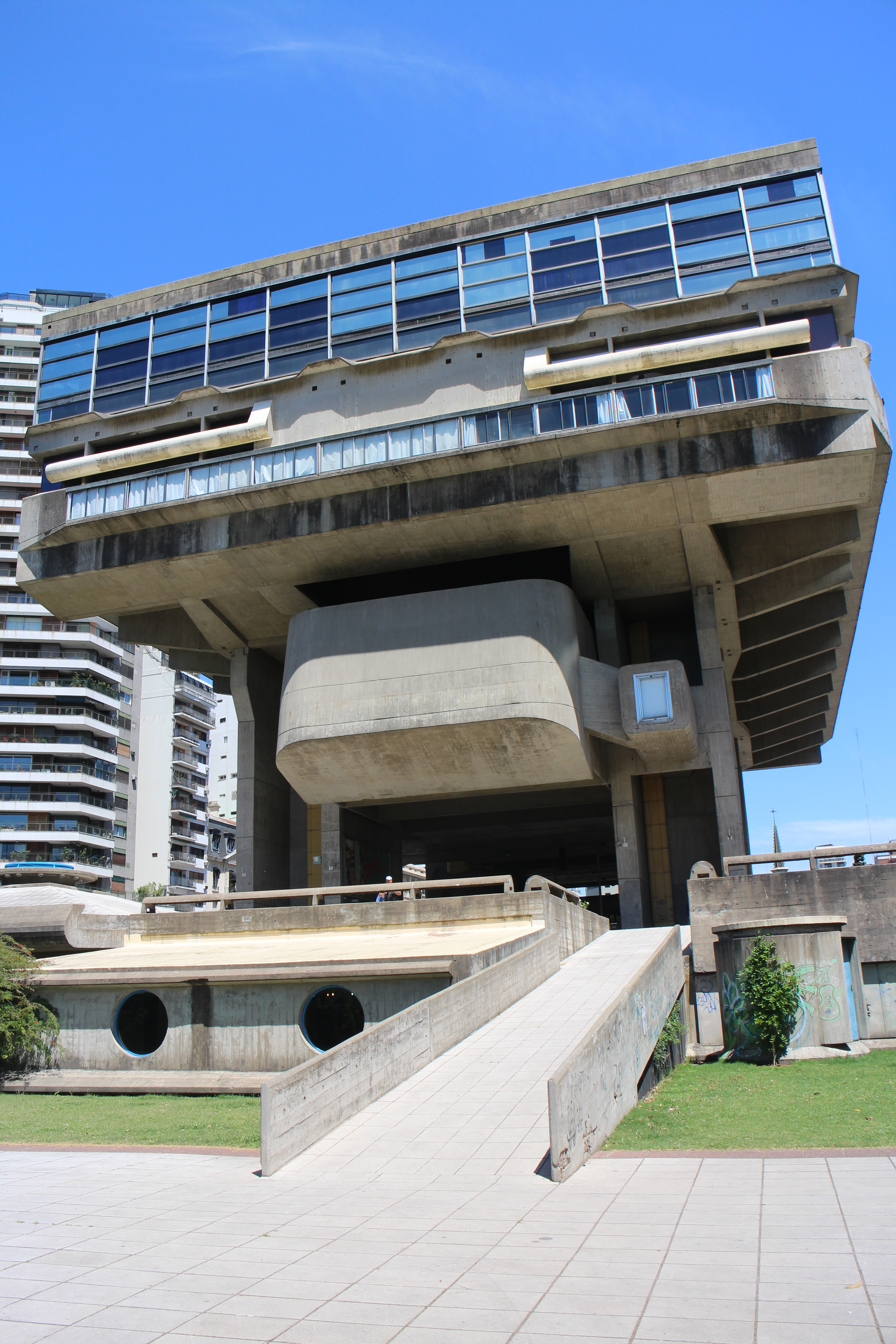
- The current building, photographed in 2013
- Location: Agüero 2502; Recoleta, Buenos Aires, Argentina
- Type: National Library
- Established: 1810; 215 years ago
- Architects: Clorindo Testa, Francisco Bullrich and Alicia Cazzaniga

Collection
- Size: 1,000,000 registries

Other information
- Budget: A$ 651,345,809 (2018)
- Director: Juan Sasturain
- Employees: 746 (2020)
- Website: bn.gov.ar

The Mariano Moreno National Library (Spanish: Biblioteca Nacional Mariano Moreno) is the largest library in Argentina. It is located in the barrio of Recoleta in Buenos Aires. The library is named after Mariano Moreno, one of the ideologists of the May Revolution and its first director.

The National Library is an agency under the Ministry of Culture of Argentina.

== History ==
=== Public Library of Buenos Aires ===
Originally named the Public Library of Buenos Aires and founded in September 1810 by decree of the first Government Junta of the May Revolution first Government Junta, it later became the country's only national library when it redefined its mission in 1884 and formally changed its name to the National Library of Argentina. The first headquarters, an old 18th century mansion that belonged to the Jesuits, was located on the corner of Moreno Street and Peru Street, within the historic Jesuit site known as the Manzana de Las Luces.

Mariano Moreno, the first director, prompted the creation of the Library as part of a package of measures aimed at forging a public alert towards political and civic life. Moreover, the foundation of the Public Library was laid upon the vindication of public education and instruction as a means for building an autonomous country. The initial collection was interwoven with the struggle for independence and was gathered from the expropriated personal collection of Bishop Orellana as well as the patriotic donations of the Cabildo, the Real Colegio San Carlos, Luis José Chorroarín, and Manuel Belgrano. The library's first chief directors were Dr. Saturnino Segurola and Fray Cayetano Rodriguez, both men of the Church. They were followed by Chorroarín and Manuel Moreno (brother and biographer of the founder). The lineage of directors which followed is still considered a crucial part of the Argentine intellectual and historic fabric: Marcos Sastre, Carlos Tejedor, José Mármol, Vicente Quesada, Manuel Trelles, and José Antonio Wilde.

=== National Library ===
When Buenos Aires became the capital of the Republic, the Public Library of Buenos Aires became the National Library and Antonio Wilde was appointed as its director. Wilde's tenure did not last long due to his old age and death after a sudden illness. Paul Groussac followed his directorship. Groussac created a methodical classification system based on Brunet's bibliographic model, undertook the cataloging of the manuscript collection, and published two remarkable journals: La Biblioteca, being one of the most prestigious literary journals, and Los Anales de la Biblioteca.

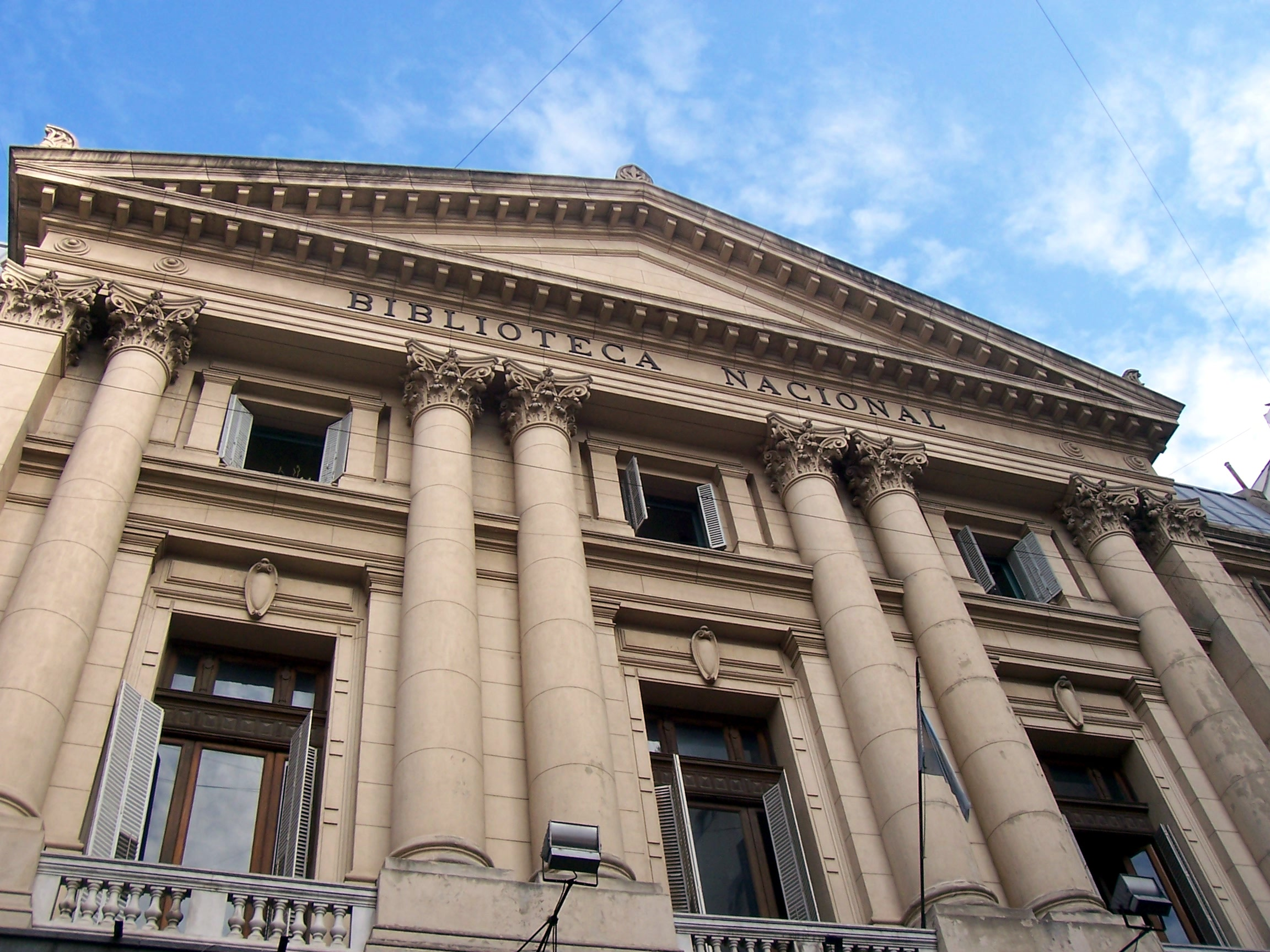
The former main building

Another milestone was the opening of the building on Mexico Street (in the Montserrat ward) in 1901, a building which was originally designed for the National Lottery. This is the reason early visitors unfamiliar with the story of the building were commonly surprised when walking a staircase adorned with lottery-ornaments. During Groussac's forty-year administration the library's patrimony was also enriched with many important donations including Angel Justiniano Carranza's personal collection, 18,600 volumes from the nineteenth-century legal expert Amancio Alcorta, and Martín García Merou's collection - which included valuable papers regarding the foundation of the city of Buenos Aires. Ironically, just as the former director Mármol and the future director, Borges, Groussac developed blindness. He still operated as the National Library's director for some years before dying in 1929.

In 1931 the widely known novelist Gustavo Martínez Zuviría was appointed as the Library's eighteenth director. During Martinez Zuviria's tenure the modernization of services and the growth of the library collection became his focus; both of which enhanced the nation's heritage. Among the many purchases and donations received, it is important to highlight his purchase of the Foulché-Delbosc collection.

The next director, whose presence is one of Argentina's key twentieth century intellectual figures, was Jorge Luis Borges. He managed the institution along with the vice director Edmundo José Clemente from 1955 through 1973. Shortly after his appointment he was informed that he needed to give up reading and writing because of his weakened vision.

=== New Building ===
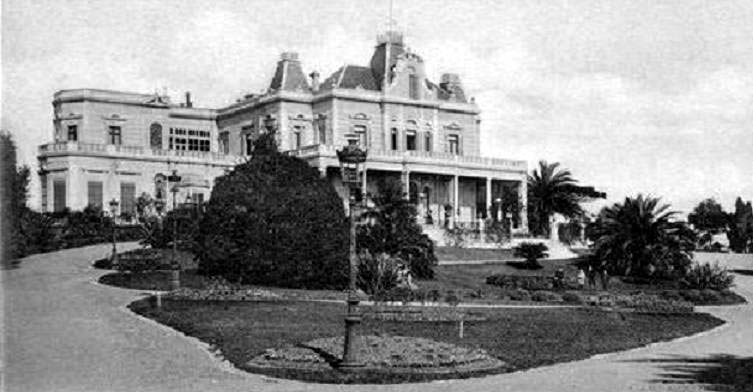
Postcard depicting Unzué Palace before its demolition, c. 1900

Clemente, his second-in-command and his close friend, was very involved in the construction of the new building, located at the site of the Unzué Palace, the official residence where President Juan Perón and his late wife Evita resided. Following a politically motivated demolition of the Unzué Palace in 1958, the grounds were designated for the library's new main building. The brutalist structure was designed in 1961, though construction did not begin until 1971. The new library was inaugurated on April 10, 1992.

The successive changes in government leadership and bureaucracies, along with certain indifferences towards cultural matters were factors that delayed the project originally envisioned by the architectural team of Clorindo Testa, Francisco Bullrich, and Alicia Cazzaniga. With the creation of the new building the need for trained staff for the library led to the founding of the National School of Librarians at the old building.

== See also ==
- Asociación de Estados Iberoamericanos para el Desarrollo de las Bibliotecas Nacionales de Iberoamérica
