= La Perla Spa =

Coordinates: 37°59′36″S 57°32′40″W

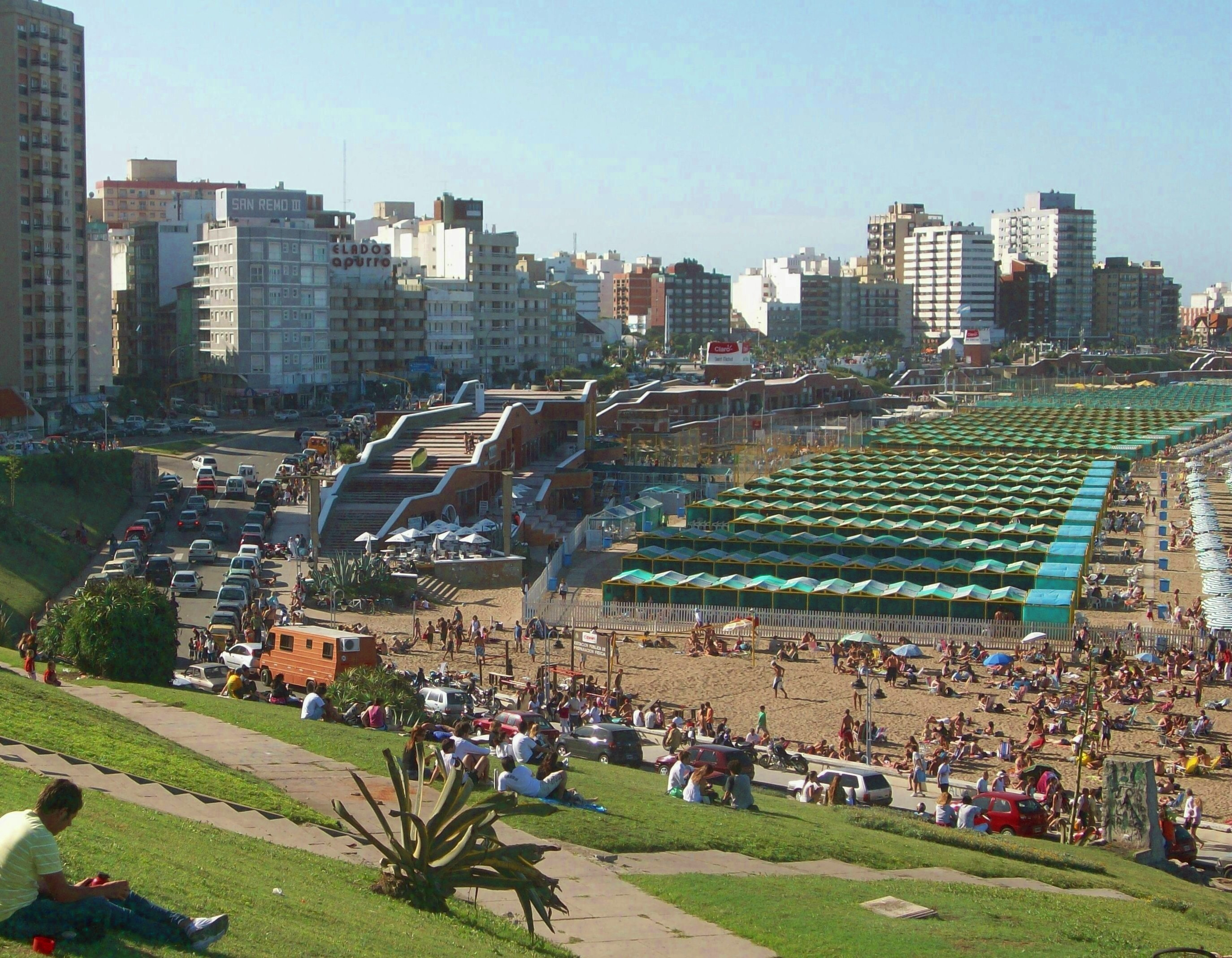
- Interactive map of the La Perla Spa area

General information
- Type: House
- Location: Mar del Plata, Argentina
- Construction started: 1985

Design and construction
- Architect: Clorindo Testa

La Perla Spa is a seaside resort created by the unification of five smaller spas along La Perla beach in Mar del Plata, Argentina. The architectural project was designed by Clorindo Testa, and completed in 1985.
