= La Perla (group) =

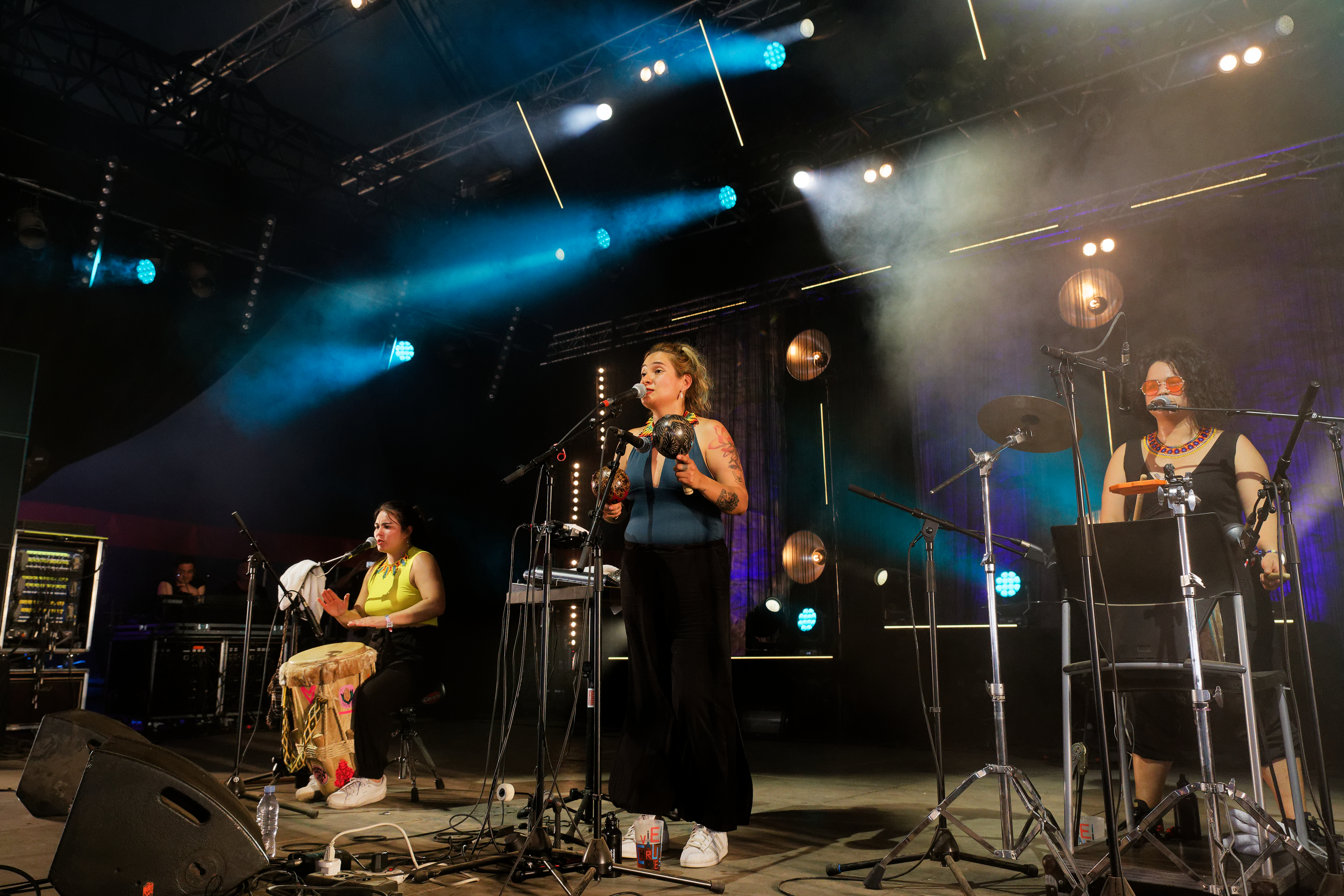
La Perla performing at Vieilles Charrues Festival in 2022

La Perla is a musical group from Bogotá, Colombia composed of Karen Forero, Giovanna Mogollón and Diana Sanmiguel.

The group is the second all-female band to win the top prize at the National Gaitas Festival.

Their song Bruja, meaning witch, was featured on the Netflix series, Always a Witch.

== Members ==
- Diana Sanmiguel: maracas, guacharaca, drums and vocals
- Roberta Leona: tambor alegre, vocals
- Karen Forero: drums, gaitas, vocals and 'beat boxing'

Sanmiguel and Leona met while studying at the university. They later met Forero at a party and asked her to join their group.
