= Clorindo Testa =

Italian-Argentine architect

Clorindo Jose Manuel Testa
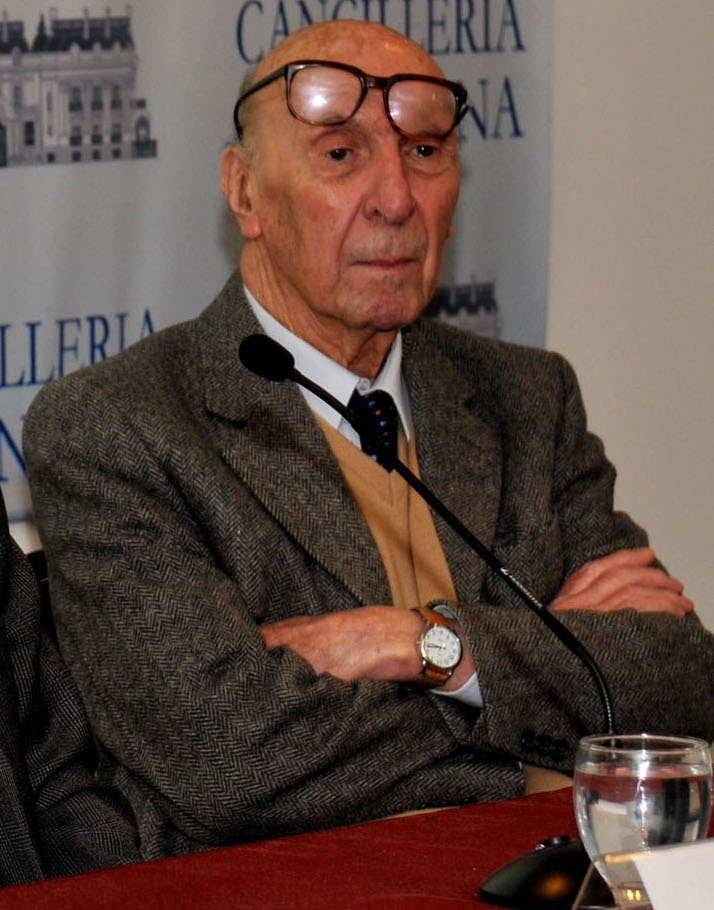
- Testa in 2012
- Born: December 10, 1923; Benevento, Italy
- Died: April 11, 2013 (aged 89); Buenos Aires, Argentina
- Occupation: Architect
- Buildings: Banco de Londres y América del Sur Biblioteca Nacional de la República Argentina La Perla Spa

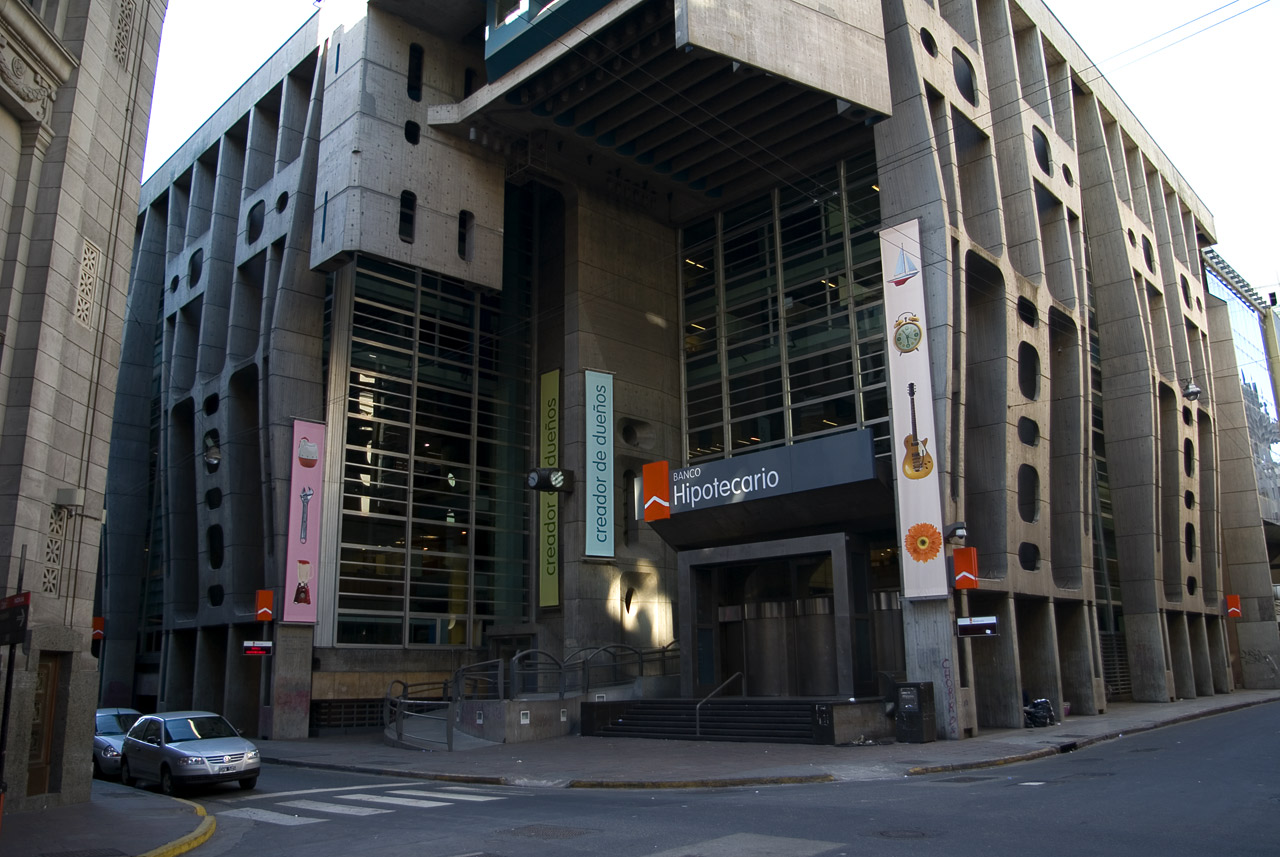
1959 - Bank of London and South America (today the Banco Hipotecario)

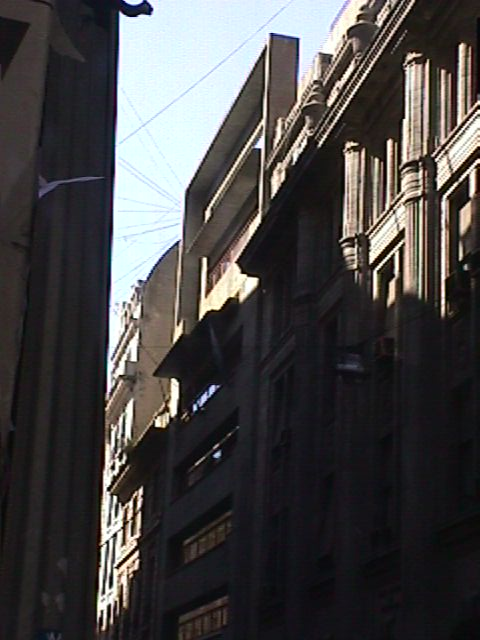
1979 - National Development Bank

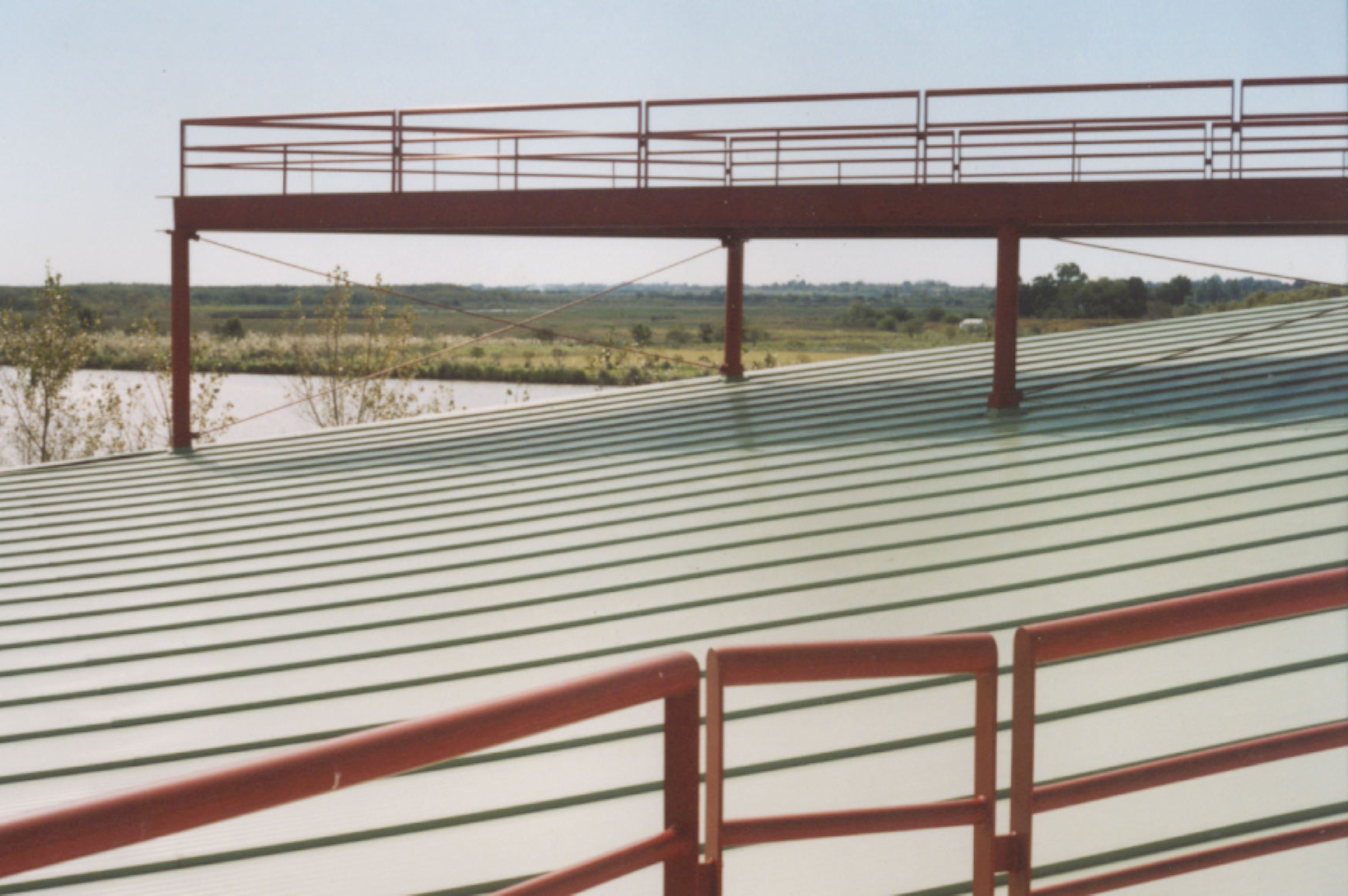
2002 - Campus in Pilar.

Clorindo Manuel José Testa (December 10, 1923 – April 11, 2013) was an Italian-Argentine architect and artist.

Testa was one of the leaders of the Argentine rationalist movement and one of the pioneers of the brutalist movement in Argentina. His style as an architect has always been influenced by his artistic nature, with projects dominated by the effects of colour, tension, metaphors and plasticity; these aspects are well illustrated in his designs for the Biblioteca Nacional de la República Argentina and the Banco de Londres building in Buenos Aires. He was member of the international jury which chose Carlos Ott as the architect for the Opera Bastille in Paris.

Testa won the Konex Award, the most prestigious award for visual arts in Argentina, in 1982, 1992 and 2012. He died, aged 89, in Buenos Aires, Argentina.

== Early life ==
Testa was born in Benevento near Naples, Italy. He graduated from the Faculty of Architecture at the Universidad de Buenos Aires in 1948. Testa came to architecture via naval engineering and then civil engineering. After a two year stay in Europe he also became a painter.

== Principal projects ==
=== 1950–1959 ===
- Argentine Chamber of Construction
- Córdoba City Council Holiday Centre
- Gazebo and niches in the cemetery at La Chacarita Cemetery
- La Pampa Civic Centre (Government House, Bus Terminal, Chamber of Deputies, Library)
- Buenos Aires Master Plan
- State River Fleet Building

=== 1960–1969 ===
- National Library of the Argentine Republic (started 1962 but not opened until the 1990s)
- Torcuato di Tella Institute
- Bank of London and South America (completed 1966)
- Harrods Store
- Bank of London and River Plate
- Michel Robirosa House
- Argentine Pavilion, Madrid Countryside Fair
- Di Tella House

=== 1970–1979 ===
- Italian Hospital of Buenos Aires, extension
- Argentine Navy Officers' School
- National Museum of Visual Arts (Uruguay), extension
- BANADE (National Development Bank)
- Naval Hospital
- Carabassa House
- Pinamar Shopping Centre
- La Pampa Civic Centre: Legislative Palace
- United Dutch Bank and Dutch Embassy
- Esmeralda 1366 Apartment Building
- "Macabi" Country Club
- Building on Rodríguez Peña Street
- Castex Towers Residential Complex
- Plaza Hotel
- Central Hospital, Abidjan, Côte d'Ivoire
- Omint Sanatorium
- Las Mandarinas, Tregua House. (ex LaCarra House)
- Castiñeira House

=== 1980–1989 ===
- Recoleta Cultural Centre
- Castex Towers, Phase 1
- Aerolíneas Argentinas Flight Simulator
- Castex Towers, Phase 2
- Santa Rosa Civic Centre, extension
- Clorindo Testa's Studio
- Paseo de la Recoleta Shopping Centre
- Capotesta House
- Banco Nación, Carlos Paz Branch, Córdoba
- Paseo Infanta Gymnasium
- La Perla Spa (Balneario La Perla)
- Castex Towers, Phase 3
- La Tumbona House
- I.C.I. Premises
- Paseo Infanta Japanese Restaurant
- House at San Diego Country Club

=== 1990–1999 ===
- Plaza Del Pilar, Buenos Aires Design Center
- House in Martínez
- Interior Forma Retail Premises
- S.G.I.A.R. Temple Auditorium
- Caritas Prototype Daycare Centres and Schools
- Stand, Buenos Aires International Book Fair
- Green House
- Altera Art Gallery
- House in River Oaks Neighbourhood, Maschwitz

=== 2000–2009 ===
- Stud House in La Plata
- Di Tella Apartment
- Torcuato di Tella University
- Quilmes Hospital
- Campus Universidad del Salvador, Auditorium
- Campus University of La Punta (San Luis)
- Konex Foundation Cultural Centre
- La Pampa Provincial Government Library
