= Farnsworth House =

Modernist house in Plano, Illinois, US

- U.S. National Register of Historic Places
- U.S. National Historic Landmark
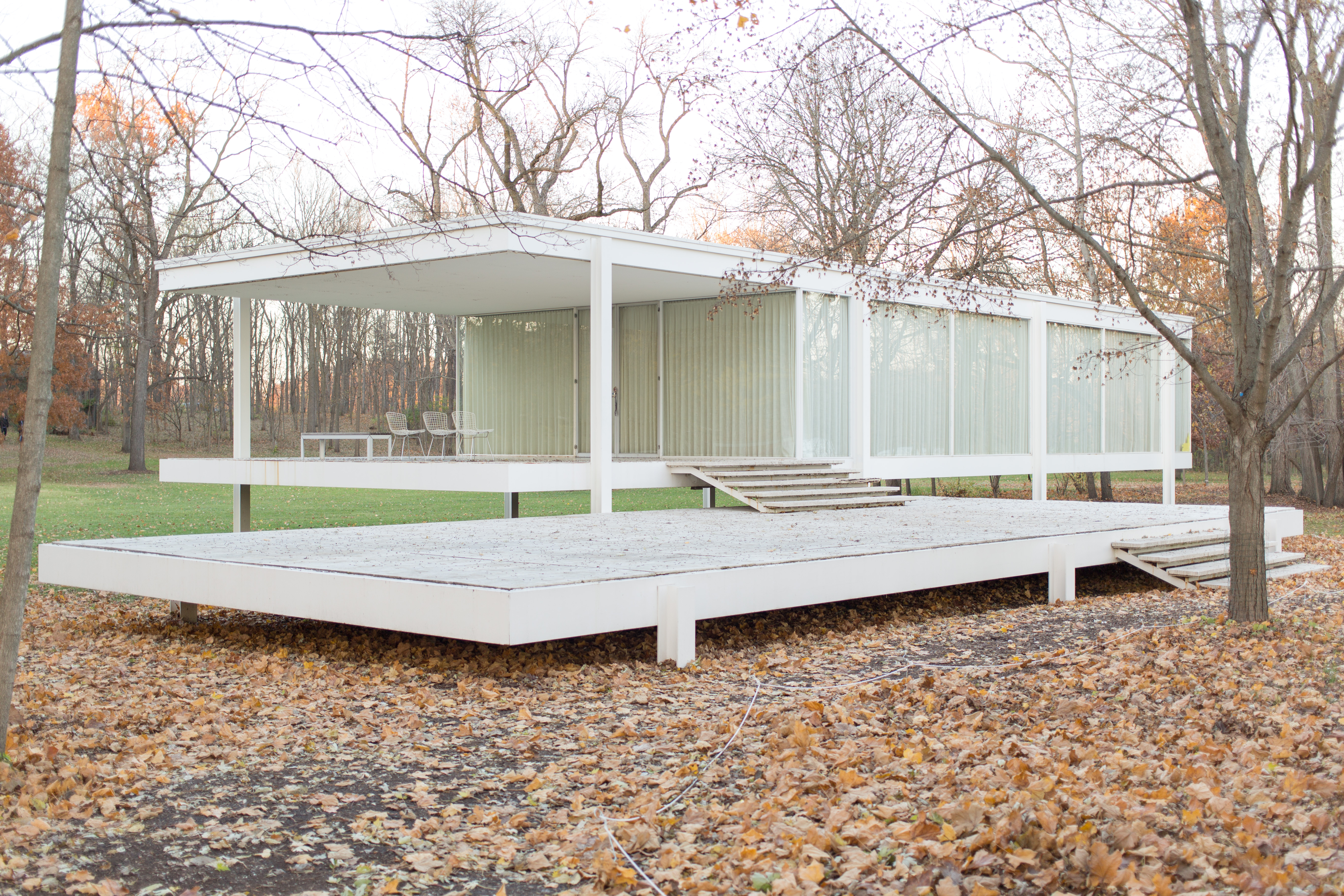

- Location within Illinois Location within the United States
- Interactive map showing Farnsworth House's location
- Nearest city: Plano, Illinois
- Coordinates: 41°38′06″N 88°32′09″W
- Built: 1949–1950
- Architect: Ludwig Mies van der Rohe
- Architectural style: International Style, Modernist
- Visitation: 10,000 (2024)
- NRHP reference No.: 04000867

Significant dates
- Added to NRHP: October 7, 2004
- Designated NHL: February 17, 2006

The Edith Farnsworth House is a historic house museum along the Fox River near Plano, Illinois, United States. Completed in 1951, it was designed by Ludwig Mies van der Rohe in the International Style and built as a weekend retreat for the nephrologist and physician Edith Farnsworth. It is one of three private residences Mies designed in the U.S. and is cited as a major modernist work. The house is raised 5 1/4 feet (1.6 m) above the floodplain, with a minimalist exterior and a mostly open plan interior. The surrounding 62-acre (25 ha) estate also includes a visitor center and exhibit gallery. The estate is owned and operated by the National Trust for Historic Preservation.

Farnsworth bought the site in the mid-1940s and asked Mies to design a house there after meeting him in 1945. Despite flooding concerns, Mies decided to build the house elevated above the Fox River floodplain. After extensive delays, work began in 1949, and Farnsworth moved in during December 1950. Mies and Farnsworth's once-cordial relationship deteriorated over the project's cost increases, and they sued each other in 1951, prompting a years-long legal dispute. Though the original design had numerous flaws and struggled to be energy efficient, Farnsworth owned it until 1972. The next owner, the British nobleman Peter Palumbo, renovated the Farnsworth House and used it as a summer retreat. After two floods in the late 1990s, Palumbo restored the house again, opening it to the public in 1997. The National Trust acquired the house in 2003 and reopened it the following year. Landmarks Illinois initially operated the house, which was renovated again following a 2008 flood. The National Trust took over operations in 2010.

The Farnsworth House is accessed from the south by an outdoor travertine terrace, occupying an intermediate level between the ground and the house itself. The concrete floor and roof slabs are supported by eight steel columns, which divide the house into three west–east bays. The facade is composed of glass, interspersed with steel mullions; the western third of the house is an open-air veranda. The interior has a minimalist color scheme and is interrupted only by an off-center utility core and a movable wardrobe. The core contains utilities, a kitchen, and bathrooms, while living, dining, and sleeping areas are placed around it. Radiant heating, pipes, and ducts were embedded into the floor, and both Farnsworth and Palumbo furnished the house with various items.

The Farnsworth House has received extensive architectural commentary over the years, with a number of laudatory reviews when it was built. Although it was initially controversial, in part because of its then unique modernist design and because of Mies and Farnsworth's feud; such criticism became less intense after Mies died in 1969. The house has been the subject of books, films, exhibits, and other media works and is designated as a National Historic Landmark. Its design has influenced that of other houses and Mies's later work.

== Site ==
The Farnsworth House is located in Kendall County near Plano, Illinois, United States, about 58 miles (93 km) southwest of Chicago. The house is situated on a floodplain along the north bank of the Fox River and is surrounded by trees on three sides. Fox River Drive runs west of the house, behind the trees, while a grassy meadow slopes slightly upward to the north. To keep the house cool during the summer, the southern facade was shaded by a black maple, which was removed in 2013. The original owner, Edith Farnsworth, hired the architect Alfred Caldwell to arrange orchards and gardens about the property. The house was originally not built with any vehicular access. A two-car garage was later built to the north, and the second owner, Peter Palumbo, hired the landscape architect Lanning Roper to build a serpentine gravel driveway. Roper and Palumbo planted 350 trees on the estate over several years, and Roper also designed an English–style meadow and daffodil gardens surrounding the house.

The house is part of an estate that is variously cited as covering 58 acres (23 ha) or 62 acres (25 ha). The estate includes the main house, a tennis court, swimming pool, and outbuildings such as a boathouse and fieldhouse. Under Palumbo's ownership, the estate had sculptures by Harry Bertoia, Alexander Calder, Anthony Caro, Andy Goldsworthy, Ellsworth Kelly, Henry Moore, Claes Oldenburg, and Richard Serra. Palumbo also displayed objects such as British telephone boxes and a piece of the Berlin Wall. When the house opened as a museum in the 21st century, the estate had 2.5 miles (4.0 km) of trails.

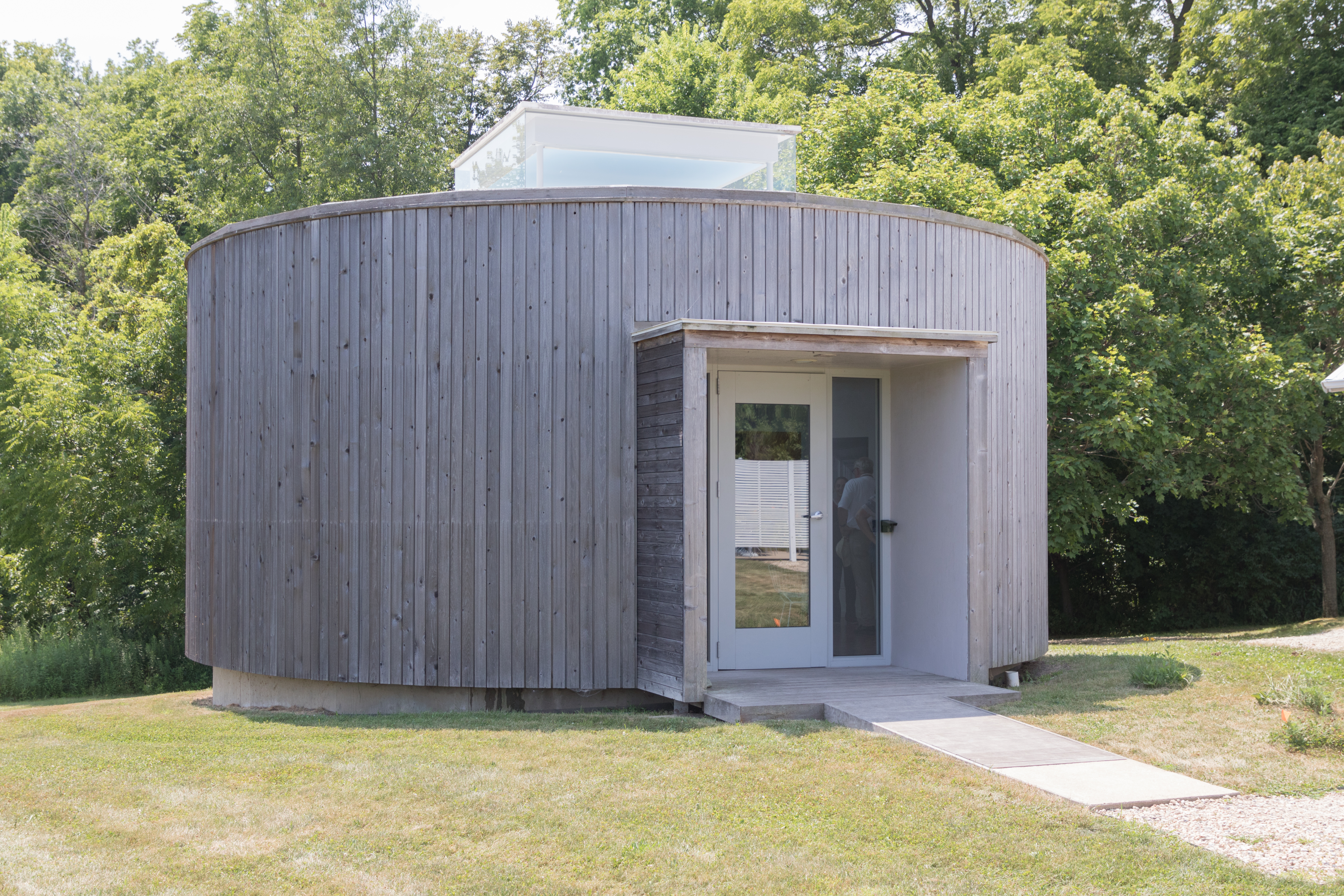
Barnsworth Gallery near the Farnsworth House Visitor Center

There is a visitor center about 0.5 miles (0.80 km) east of the main house. Built by Palumbo, one of the house's past owners, the visitor center was originally a prefabricated building with a metal facade. In the 2000s, the visitor center's facade was covered in wood. The Barnsworth Gallery, which contains temporary exhibition space and storage areas for the Farnsworth House's wardrobe, is next to the visitor center. Built by Illinois Institute of Technology students, the Barnsworth Gallery has a circular floor plan and includes construction materials salvaged from other construction projects in Illinois.

== History ==
The original owner was Edith Farnsworth, a kidney doctor from Chicago, who recalled being lonely and overburdened with work despite her successful career. She was a single, middle-aged woman at a time when relatively few American women lived such a lifestyle. The house's architect, Ludwig Mies van der Rohe, had been refining his designs for decades before the Farnsworth House commission and had moved to the U.S. in 1938. He had evolved from using traditional architectural styles in the 1900s to using more modernist styles by the 1930s, and he had built several structures that combined glass facades and more traditional courtyards. For several years, Mies had wanted to build living rooms with glass walls, leading historians to suggest that Mies may have designed the Farnsworth House primarily to further his own design objectives.

=== Development ===
==== Selection of site and architect ====
In the 1940s, Farnsworth bought a farm that the McCormick family had been operating in Plano; sources disagree on whether this initial acquisition covered 7 acres (2.8 ha) or 9 acres (3.6 ha). Farnsworth wanted to build a weekend retreat there. Farnsworth and Mies met during a dinner party in late 1945, when she was 42 and he was 59 years old. As Farnsworth recalled, Mies had been quiet for most of the dinner, and only after the meal did she ask if "some young man" working for Mies's firm could design a weekend house on her Plano property. Farnsworth told Mies that she wanted to spend $8,000–10,000 on the house, (Note: Equivalent to $110,000–275,000 in 2024) and Mies expressed interest in the project.

Shortly after meeting Mies, Farnsworth drove him to the site. The parcel sat on the north bank of the Fox River; it was surrounded by trees on all sides, except to the west, and there was a driveway from the north. Mies recommended that the house be built 75 feet (23 m) from the riverbank, next to a maple tree, and that it be shaded by other trees. Though Farnsworth and local contractor Karl Freund (Note: His name is most commonly spelled "Karl Freund", but one source spells it as "Carl Friend".) expressed concerns about flooding, Mies thought the design could overcome these issues. Mies and Farnsworth worked closely during the house's development, frequently revisiting the site. They were sometimes accompanied by Mies's employees or other acquaintances, and they also frequently met in Chicago. There is an unsubstantiated rumor that the two were romantically involved. (Note: According to the Architectural Record, the rumor dates from Franz Schulze's 1985 biography of Mies based on circumstantial evidence. The scholars Nora Wendl and Alice T. Friedman were unable to find evidence of any such affair.)

==== Design ====
If you view nature through the glass walls of the Farnsworth House, (Note: Beam 2020, p. 90, gives an alternate wording of "When one looks at Nature through the glass walls...") it gains a more profound significance than if viewed from the outside. That way more is said about nature—it becomes part of a larger whole.

— Ludwig Mies van der Rohe, 1958 interview

Edward Duckett, one of Mies's associates, devised alternate plans for elevated and at-grade structures. Mies ultimately decided to raise the house about 5 feet (1.5 m) from the ground, since it would justify his decision to build the house on the Fox River's floodplain. The initial design called for a simple design with a bolted steel frame, plywood core, and concrete-slab floor. When Farnsworth asked Mies what materials he was considering, Mies said he would use steel and glass, explaining, "in that way we'll let the outside in". Mies disregarded privacy and social concerns, saying: "If you view nature through the glass walls of the Farnsworth House, it gains a more profound significance than if viewed from the outside. That way more is said about nature—it becomes part of a larger whole."

Mies's team drew hundreds of diagrams. The architect considered and abandoned plans for interior glass partitions, mosquito screens, and multiple stairs. Mies also considered various materials for the house's floor and mechanical core, and he contemplated repositioning and resizing various architectural elements. There were also debates over whether to even use an open-plan interior and whether to include a second entrance or movable windows. The design was partly complete by 1947, when it was included in an exhibition of Mies's work at New York's Museum of Modern Art (MoMA). After visiting the MoMA exhibition, Farnsworth recalled that she thought the house "might well become the prototype of new and important elements of American architecture", even though many of the architectural details were still not finalized. Construction was delayed because Mies waited another two years after completing the model and some watercolors, and Farnsworth was waiting to use funds from a bequest. Work resumed after Farnsworth contacted Mies's associate Alfred Caldwell, who agreed to draw up plans.

Farnsworth and Mies compromised on design details such as kitchen equipment, mirror sizes, and the presence of a fireplace. The cost rose significantly because of the need to elevate the house, the lack of an access road, and Farnsworth's requirement that wires and pipes be placed underground. Further complicating matters, materials and equipment for the rural site had to be delivered from Plano. Mies's team prepared several plans with varying dimensions, each with different costs; they ultimately selected a plan for a 77-by-28-by-9.5-foot (23.5 by 8.5 by 2.9 m) house, which was expected to cost around $60,000. (Note: Equivalent to $625,000 in 2024) Although no one challenged Mies's decision to use single-pane glass rather than costlier insulated glazing, contractors did question his decision to use travertine instead of a cheaper stone. Even when Farnsworth set a budget of $40,000, (Note: Equivalent to $417,000 in 2024) Mies said it was enough for only a "cheap house", notwithstanding the fact that similar houses cost much less.

==== Construction ====
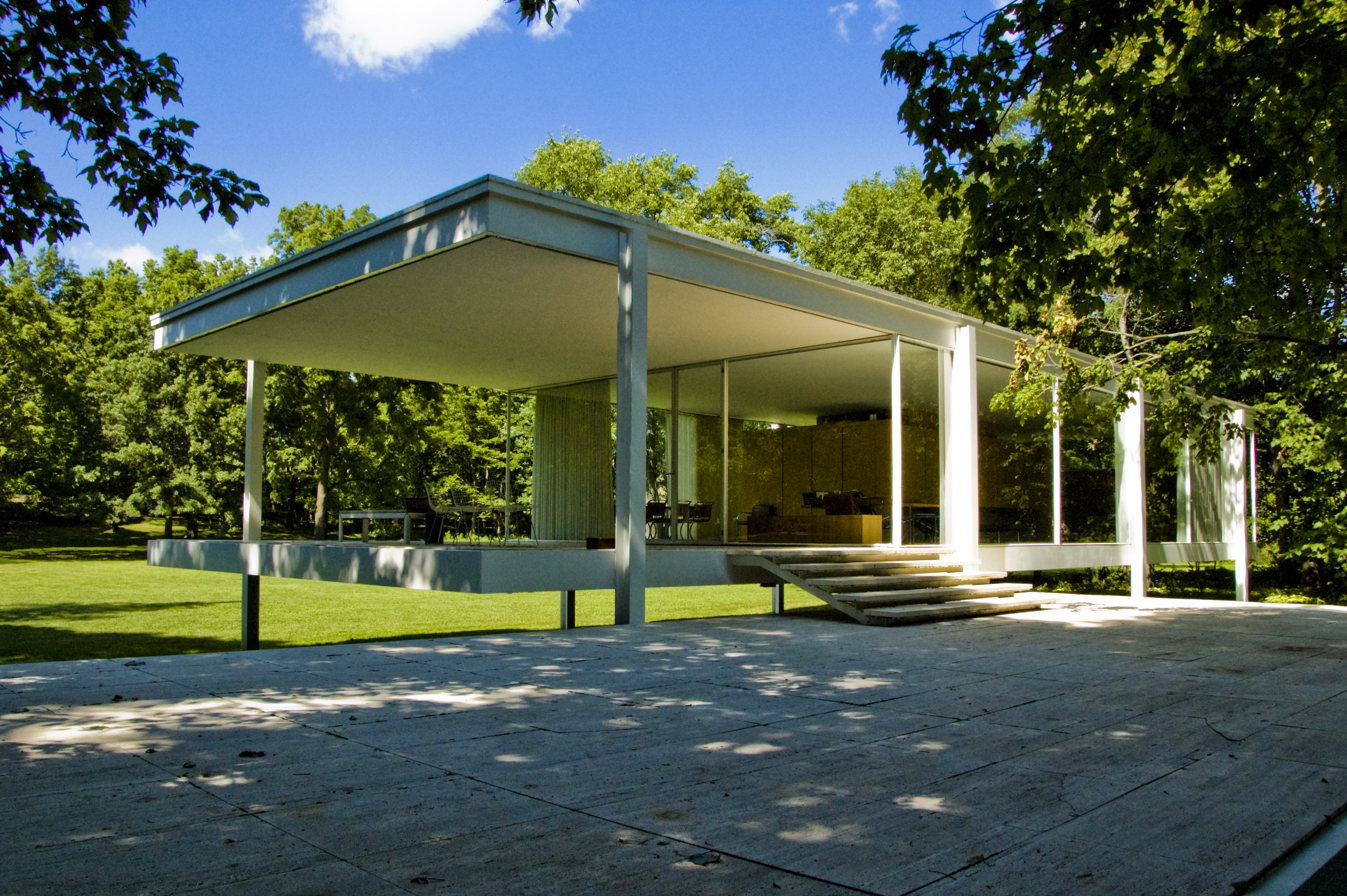
The exterior, seen from the southwest

By the time work was about to begin, the cost had risen to $60,000. Though Mies and Farnsworth remained friendly, they were spending less time together by 1948, and Farnsworth began to doubt Mies after hearing acquaintances say negative things about him. Construction began in 1949; sources disagree on whether work began in May or September. Due to Mies's exacting requirements for the project, contractors cut the material to precise dimensions. Mies purchased plate glass sheets from the Pittsburgh Plate Glass Company and steel beams from the Wendnagel Steel Company, which were manufactured off-site. To ensure the steel was smooth, workers ground it seventy times. The house used 600 travertine slabs from the Carthage Marble Corporation, with Mies rejecting 46 more slabs due to poor quality. Most other architectural elements were custom-built at a workshop or at Mies's architectural studio. Mies personally picked up the wood panels from the warehouse where they were manufactured, and he once fired a local contractor who refused to grade the site to a 1/10-inch (2.5 mm) accuracy.

Farnsworth engaged herself in the construction process, observing contractors pour the house's foundations. From the outset, the roof was leaking, and Farnsworth called to complain about details such as the fireplace's design. The structural core was so densely packed with utilities, one plumber suggested that the house be called "My Mies-ception". Korean War–era inflation and Mies's requirement for high-quality materials had increased construction costs significantly by 1950. By the middle of the year, work on the roof was progressing, and architecture students and architects frequently came to visit. Mies's architectural practice eventually recorded 5,884 billable hours on the project; by comparison, they had recorded fewer than half as many billable hours on 860–880 Lake Shore Drive, a pair of apartment buildings in Chicago.

In August 1950, Mies's practice billed Farnsworth for $69,868.80 (Note: Equivalent to $721,000 in 2024) after which Farnsworth canceled plans for a mosquito screen and directed Mies's team not to make any further expenditures. Following this memo, Mies and Farnsworth barely talked, and their relationship devolved into an acrimonious dispute over the costs. Farnsworth had moved in by December 1950, calling the house the "Fox River Project". Despite her dispute with Mies, she remained in contact with several of his employees, including Myron Goldsmith, who conducted some minor work over the following months. William Dunlap, a draftsman in Mies's office and the father of New York Times reporter David W. Dunlap, designed mosquito screens for the house. She also asked Dunlap to design her a wardrobe, supplementing a tiny closet that Mies designed next to the kitchen. The house was finished in March 1951.

=== Farnsworth ownership ===
From the outset, the house had several major design flaws, which may have contributed to the deterioration of Farnsworth's relationship with Mies. Farnsworth wrote diary entries about these flaws. Leaking roofs, a poorly ventilated fireplace, accumulations of condensation and oil, inadequate temperature control, and swarms of mosquitoes were major issues, and the exterior also needed constant maintenance. The uninsulated southern facade absorbed large amounts of midday sunlight, and the poorly insulated interior led to significant heating bills. Another issue was the lack of privacy, especially as architecture fans kept coming to the house, looking through the windows and taking pictures. Farnsworth, who likened her experience to that of a caged animal, eventually added blinds and shrubs.

Although Mies had designed furniture for the house, Farnsworth refused to accept it. She instead brought her own furnishings, which were more varied in style and included pieces that she had inherited from her family. Farnsworth later recalled that Mies had wanted to design her a 5-foot-tall (1.5 m) wardrobe, which she felt would provide inadequate privacy because she was 6 feet (180 cm) tall. Farnsworth placed Chinese guardian lion statues on either side of the steps. Farnsworth used her Plano house for two decades but had a low opinion of it. She never fully furnished the space and actively discouraged visitors; several friends recalled that she constantly complained about the building. Other observers, like the historian Katharine Kuh and Farnsworth's nephew Fairbank Carpenter, said she described the house not as her own, but as Mies's.

==== Cost dispute ====
The total cost came to about $74,000, (Note: Equivalent to $686,000 in 2024) including a $15,000 architect's fee and $12,000 in service fees. (Note: The architect's fee is equivalent to $145,000, and the service fee is equivalent to $116,000, in 2024.) This was about ten times the cost of a typical American house, surpassing the prices of even the Gropius House and Glass House, both of which were also experimental designs. Farnsworth claimed she only owed $65,000. (Note: Equivalent to $628,000 in 2024) The architect Philip Johnson recommended that Mies consult Johnson's business manager, Robert C. Wiley, for help, while Farnsworth hired one of her patients as her attorney. Wiley offered to settle for $4,500, while Farnsworth's lawyer offered $1,500; (Note: Mies's offer is equivalent to $43,000, and Farnsworth's lawyer's offer is equivalent to $14,000, in 2024.) after they reached a stalemate, Wiley directed Mies to the law firm of Sonnenschein. In July 1951, Mies sued Farnsworth to recover a $3,673.09 debt and the unpaid balance of the construction fee, for a total of $28,173. (Note: The outstanding debt is equivalent to $35,000, and the total amount sought is equivalent to $272,000, in 2024.) Farnsworth accused Mies of malpractice and countersued in October for $33,872, (Note: Equivalent to $327,000 in 2024) the cost overrun from her original $40,000 budget.

The lawsuits were heard at the Kendall County Courthouse between late May and early July 1952. The ensuing trial was filled with rancor, often veering into minute personal details; the Architectural Record wrote that the dispute involved 4,000 pages of transcripts. One of Mies's biographers, Franz Schulze, described the dispute as "a clash of two personalities of immense force and authority". After the trial adjourned, the closing arguments were delayed until January 1953. The judge ruled on May 7, 1953, that Mies had not misrepresented anything and had "at all times acted in good faith", whereas Farnsworth had been untruthful during the trial. Farnsworth was compelled to pay all of the legal costs, plus $12,934.30 owed to Mies, (Note: Equivalent to $121,000 in 2024) for a total of $14,000. (Note: Equivalent to $131,000 in 2024) Farnsworth's appeal of the lawsuit lasted until 1955 or 1956, with the parties eventually settling for $2,000 or $2,500. (Note: Equivalent to $18,000–22,000 in 2024) Schulze described the dispute as a humiliation for Farnsworth.

==== Mid-1950s to late 1960s ====
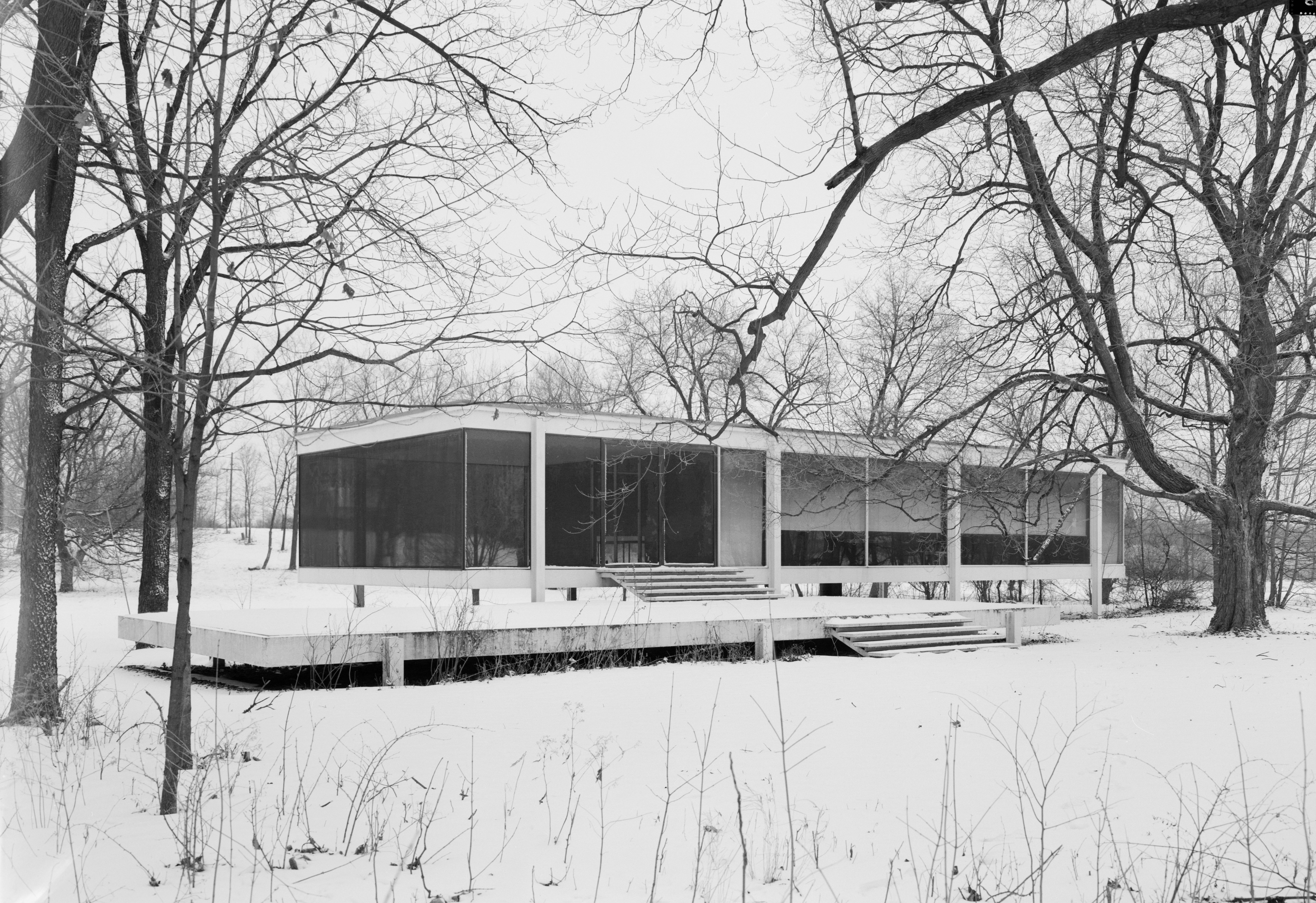
A winter view of the house in 1971, showing the original screens on the veranda and blinds inside the house

Soon after moving into the house, Farnsworth learned that her neighbors could see her every move; she eventually formed close friendships with many of them. Her visitors included Kuh and the architects Richard Neutra, Paul Schweikher, and Philip Johnson, in addition to crowds of architecture fans who observed the building unsolicited. Farnsworth continued to speak negatively of Mies to the news media for years, and the publication of their dispute prompted various critiques of the house, especially from journalists who disliked the style. Many members of the general public disapproved of the design as well, visiting on weekends to gawk at it.

A 1954 flood inundated the floor by up to 4 feet (1.2 m), destroying some of Farnsworth's furnishings. Afterward, Farnsworth added roller blinds and acquired heavier pieces of furniture. By 1958, the writer Adrian Gale had characterized it as a "sophisticated camp site rather than a weekend dreamhouse". In the 1960s, when Farnsworth was in her 60s, she increasingly stayed in Plano instead of Chicago. On Saturday mornings, she held French language classes for local children at the house. Farnsworth also acquired 55 acres (0.22 km^{2}) of land next to her house during her ownership.

In 1967, the government of Kendall County decided to replace an 83-year-old bridge over the Fox River, filing eminent domain proceedings against Farnsworth and two other landowners; this required seizing 2 acres (0.81 ha) from Farnsworth. Since the new bridge would be only 180 feet (55 m) away from the house, Farnsworth alleged that the house would be vulnerable to out-of-control drivers. In an attempt to prevent construction, Farnsworth commissioned an archeological survey, which found Native American artifacts. She offered to give 2 acres, and then the entire estate, to the Illinois Department of Conservation, which did not respond. Afterward, Farnsworth sued in September 1967, saying she would lose her peace and quiet. She received $17,000 in restitution, (Note: Equivalent to $122,000 in 2024) far less than the $250,000 she had sought, (Note: Equivalent to $1,790,000 in 2024) prompting her to appeal. The doctor ultimately lost her lawsuit, and the new bridge was built close enough for traffic to be seen and heard from the house.

=== Palumbo ownership ===
==== Acquisition and renovation ====
The next owner, the British nobleman Peter Palumbo, had learned about the Farnsworth House as a student in the 1950s. He had developed a fascination with Mies's work, having hired him to design an unbuilt office block in London in the 1960s. Palumbo saw an advertisement for the house in the Chicago Tribune by chance in 1968. He recalled visiting the house and seeing it in disrepair, with discolored paneling, plain furniture, and unwashed dishes. The house's design flaws had also caused peeling paint and deformed plasterwork on the roof. Negotiations lasted several years, with Palumbo characterizing Farnsworth as "a difficult, ferocious woman". Palumbo acquired the Farnsworth House in 1972, (Note: Some sources incorrectly cite him as having bought the house in 1968, but Palumbo recalled having purchased it in 1972.) paying either $120,000 or $150,000 for the property. (Note: Equivalent to $680,000–851,000 in 2024) Afterward, Farnsworth moved to Italy, where she lived until her death in 1977. Palumbo originally wanted to have Mies redesign the house, but after the architect died in 1969, Palumbo instead hired Mies's grandson Dirk Lohan.

Palumbo spent $500,000 on renovations. (Note: Equivalent to $2,835,000 in 2024) He removed the veranda screen and added air conditioning and electric heat. The old oil-fired boiler was removed, the leaking roof was repaired, and the house was repainted. A spout at the center of the roof was rebuilt with a steeper pitch to aid drainage. The interior remained unchanged, except for a stone above the fireplace hearth. He hired Lohan to construct furniture from the house. As for the estate, Palumbo hired Lanning Roper to re-landscape the grounds, which included a new pathway, additional trees flanking the house, and thousands of flowers. Palumbo installed pieces from his art collection across the estate. He also built a boathouse, tennis court, and swimming pool on the land, albeit far from the main house. Schulze described Palumbo as "the ideal owner of his house", given that Palumbo could afford its upkeep and did not live there for long periods.

==== 1970s to 1990s ====
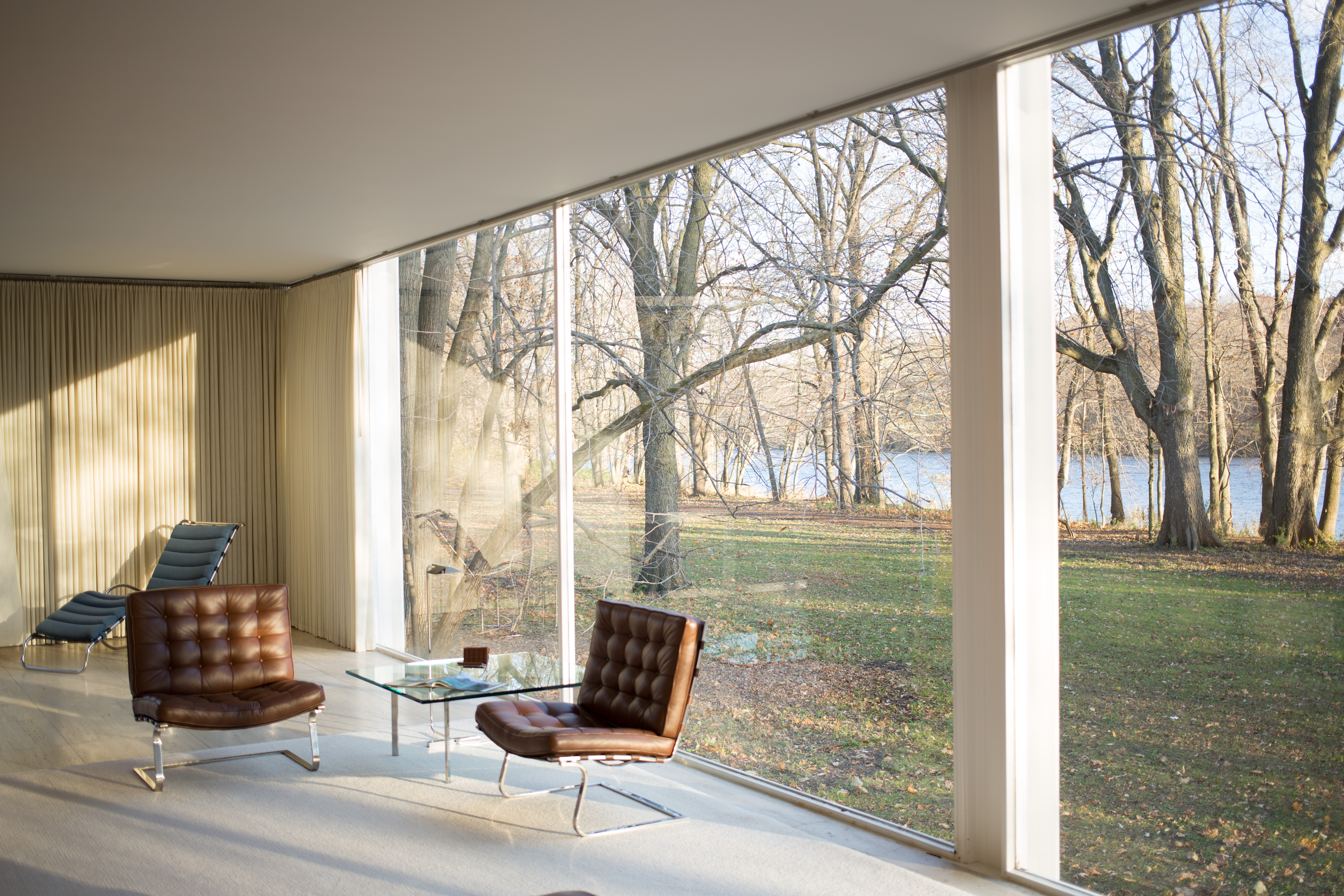
The interior, with replicas of chairs Palumbo used

Palumbo used the house as a summer retreat for three decades and bought up most of the neighboring sites over the years. He appreciated the design, saying it "falls in that no man's land between great architecture and sculpture". Unlike Farnsworth, Palumbo did not consider the house too hot, although he did sometimes encounter architecture fans camping outside the house. The house seldom held architectural tours. Palumbo rented the house to friends and maintained a second house in Plano. A New York Times reporter wrote in the 1980s that Palumbo made several annual visits to the house and sometimes brought his children along.

By the 1990s, Palumbo and his wife Hayat split their time between the Farnsworth House and their other residences, which included an apartment at 860–880 Lake Shore Drive in Chicago, Kentuck Knob in Pennsylvania, and Maisons Jaoul outside Paris. Palumbo, Hayat, and their three children stayed in Plano for six weeks every year, but since the Farnsworth House could fit only two people, they usually stayed in their other house. During the middle of that decade, they opened the estate's sculpture garden to the public. The interior was flooded again in July 1996, on Palumbo's 61st birthday. The Fox River rose more than 10 feet (3.0 m) above its regular water level, and floodwater rose 5 feet (1.5 m) above the floor slab, breaking some windows and scattering objects everywhere.

Following the 1996 flood, Palumbo spent over $250,000 on renovations, hiring Lohan for the project. Before the restoration began, the interior flooded again in February 1997 to a height of 1 foot (0.30 m). The core was completely replaced—a process that took months because the primavera wood used for the core was difficult to source—and the woodwork was covered with a waterproof sealant. To make the house financially self-sustainable, Palumbo opened it to the public in May 1997, charging $30 per person. He hired several employees to oversee and maintain the house, and he built a visitor center on the estate. To accommodate tourists, an additional stairway was built between the intermediate terrace and veranda. David W. Dunlap wrote in 1999 that objects such as a wine bottle, hanging neckties, family photos, and a telephone were visible throughout the house, giving it a lived-in feeling.

=== Organizational ownership ===
==== Sale efforts ====
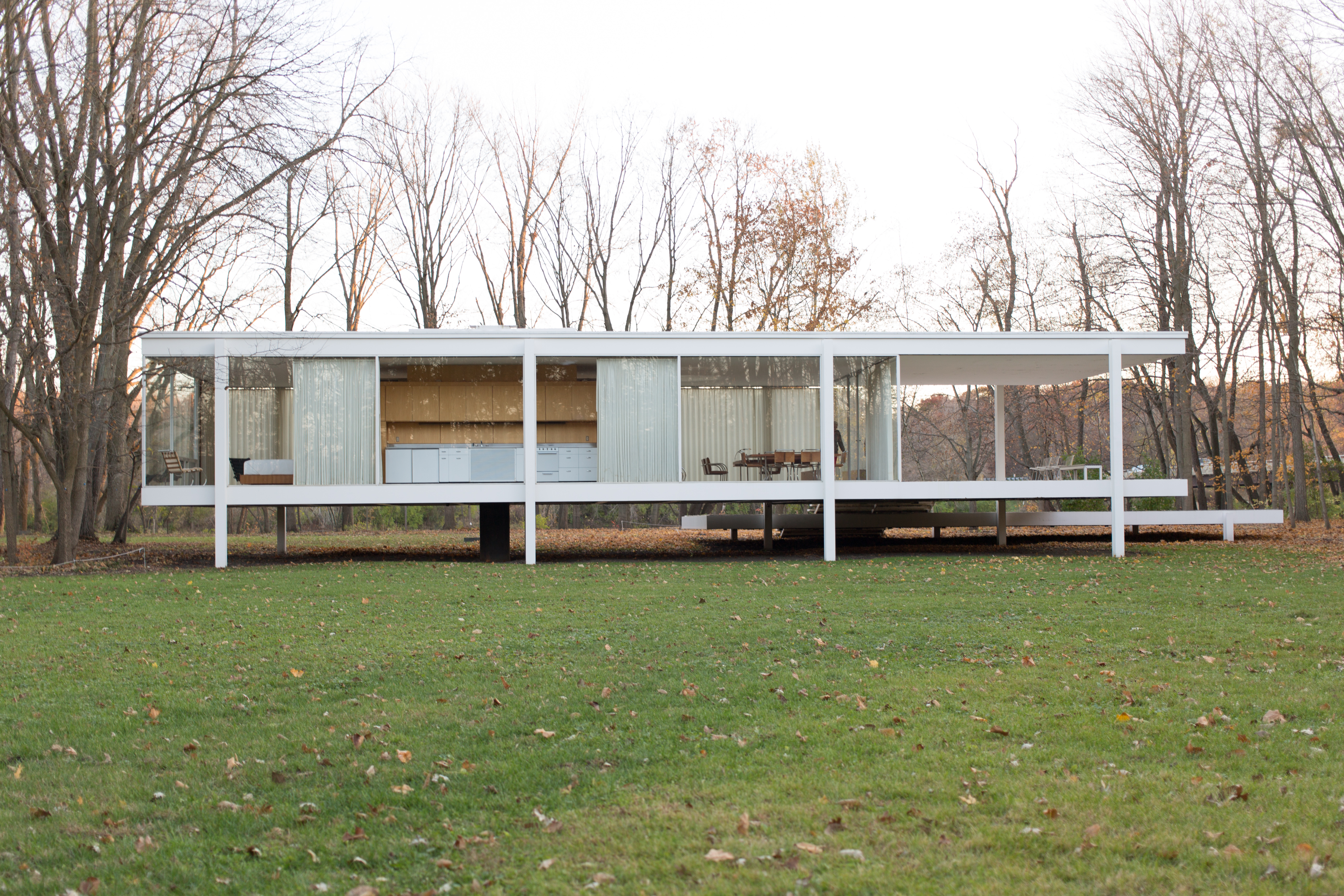
The house's northern elevation, with the kitchen visible

The Farnsworth House Gallery opened in 2000, displaying art at the house's visitor center. Palumbo announced in February 2001 that he planned to sell the house, citing personal health problems. This prompted concerns that the house would be closed to the public or dismantled. Former governor Jim Thompson, the architect Helmut Jahn, and the businessman John H. Bryan formed Friends of the Farnsworth House, asking the state government to buy the house. At the time, it had 5,000 annual visitors, less than one-fifth the number who visited Kentuck Knob, which Palumbo had also opened to the public. The state would have provided free admission to the house, and Bryan predicted it would have 25,000 to 50,000 annual visitors. Friends of the Farnsworth House estimated that the house and site would cost $6.2 million to purchase, plus $200,000 per year to maintain. The proposal had precedent: The state government had bought the Dana–Thomas House in Springfield and converted it into a museum in the 1980s.

Governor George Ryan approved funds to acquire the house in June 2001. (Note: Sources disagree on whether the state allocated $6.2 million or $7 million.) The amount included $5 million for the house and $1.2 million for the site, as well as $800,000 for furnishings. Palumbo stopped offering tours that July. The Illinois Attorney General's office had to approve the purchase, though the state's budget surplus had declined significantly by 2002. That year, Attorney General Jim Ryan (no relation to Governor Ryan) began reviewing several last-minute property acquisitions approved by the governor's office. Jim Ryan's successor Lisa Madigan withdrew from the deal in early 2003, citing the state's budget shortfall. As a result, the nonprofit organization Landmarks Illinois listed the house among Illinois's most endangered buildings. Palumbo unsuccessfully tried to sell the house himself, and he subsequently removed his art from the estate.

Palumbo hired Sotheby's in October 2003 to auction off the building, estimating that it could be sold for $4.5–6 million. The auction raised serious concerns about the house's future; Phyllis Lambert, a longtime associate of Mies, said that the auction was "putting civilization on the block". At the time, the building was not protected by landmark regulations, and Sotheby's had published a video demonstrating how the house could be relocated. Two preservationist organizations, the National Trust for Historic Preservation and Landmarks Illinois, submitted a joint bid but struggled to raise money. They had only $3.6 million on hand the day before the auction, which attracted only one other bidder, in part because of its remote location. The other bidder, later revealed as the real estate developer Aby Rosen, wanted to move the building to Long Island, New York. The art dealer Richard Gray bid on the preservationists' behalf, and the other bidder gave up after seven minutes. Gray and the preservationists ultimately paid $7.5 million, which included the $6.7 million final bid price plus an $800,000 premium.

==== Landmarks Illinois management ====
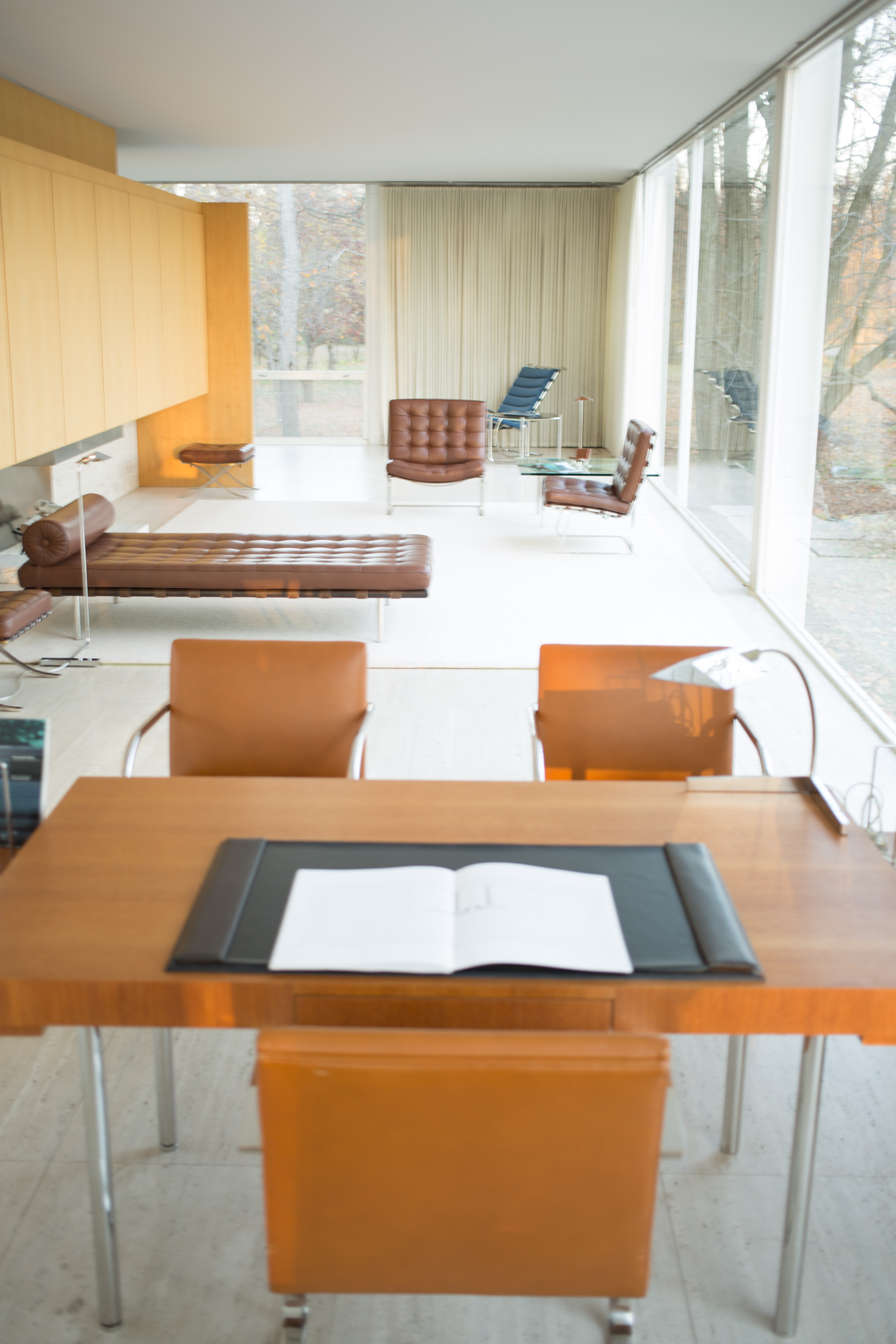
The interior of the living area

The National Trust took ownership of the Farnsworth House (one of the few post–World War II buildings the trust owned), while Landmarks Illinois operated it as a historic house museum. The groups spent $200,000 rebuilding the house's visitor center, and they re-landscaped the grounds and renovated the main house. Additionally, the National Trust began raising $5 million for an endowment fund. The house reopened on May 1, 2004, (Note: Some sources cite a public reopening of May 15.) displaying replicas of furniture designed by Mies. Even though Farnsworth was the house's namesake, the museum did not display any of her furniture. Mies's architecture had become more popular over the previous decade, there were concerns that the house's remote location would deter potential visitors.

During the 2000s, Landmarks Illinois devised plans to preserve the house, including repairs to the drainage system, decks, and roofs. Some of the mullions on the facade had warped and needed to be replaced, and there were also discussions on restoring the interior woodwork, which had been replaced following previous floods. Landmarks Illinois regularly sandblasted and repainted the facade to keep it in good condition. The Farnsworth House continued to experience flooding threats, such as in August 2007, when heavy rains caused floodwater to submerge the terrace. There were 6,500 annual visitors by 2007, at which point 92% of visitors came from outside Illinois, including one-third from outside the United States. To attract visitors, Landmarks Illinois hired a marketing director in 2008.

The house's main level was flooded for the third time in September 2008, when the floor was covered in 18 inches (46 cm) of floodwater. The furniture was saved, and the house was not structurally damaged. The flood nonetheless caused several hundred thousand dollars in damage, and Landmarks Illinois closed the house temporarily to clean up the mess. There were proposals to relocate the house or build a levee, though both plans would have significantly impacted the landscape, an integral part of the design. Other proposals included a removable floodwall and hydraulic jacks, both of which were costly, as well as a long-shot suggestion to restrict development upstream. To raise money for repairs, Landmarks Illinois hosted limited tours of the house starting in October 2008, and the house fully reopened in early 2009. The National Trust also developed a flood mitigation plan.

==== National Trust management ====
The National Trust began managing the house in 2010, as Landmarks Illinois had been losing money operating the house. Landmarks Illinois retained a preservation easement on the structure. The next year, Illinois Institute of Technology students constructed the Barnsworth Gallery next to the visitor center and built a walkway to the main house. By the mid-2010s, there were 10,000 annual visitors. To address increasing flood risks, in 2014, the National Trust proposed installing hydraulic jacks under the house, which required its temporary location. The hydraulic-jack proposal had been recommended over two alternatives—raising the land under the house by 10 feet (3.0 m), or permanently moving the house. Detractors expressed concerns about esthetics and possible defects regarding the jacks. As such, the trust was considering permanently moving the house instead by 2015, drawing criticism from Mies's grandson Dirk Lohan, who had advocated for the jacks. By 2017, the installation of hydraulic jacks was slated to cost $10 million; proceeds from a planned film about the house were to cover some of the cost.

For the 2020 operating season, the house did not open until July due to the COVID-19 pandemic. That May, floodwaters inundated the terrace, rising to within 1 foot (0.30 m) of the floor slab. That October, the National Trust and Farnsworth House officials hired Wiss, Janney, Elstner Associates, Inc. to restore the house's terrace, a project that cost $700,000 and took a year. The National Trust announced in October 2021 that the house would be renamed the Edith Farnsworth House. Scott Mehaffey, the house's executive director, said he hoped using Farnsworth's given name "would have the larger effect of inserting her into the ongoing history of modern architecture". On November 17, 2021, Edith Farnsworth's birthday, the house was rededicated. Visitation declined slightly after the COVID-19 pandemic but had recovered to 10,000 annual visitors by 2024.

== Architecture ==
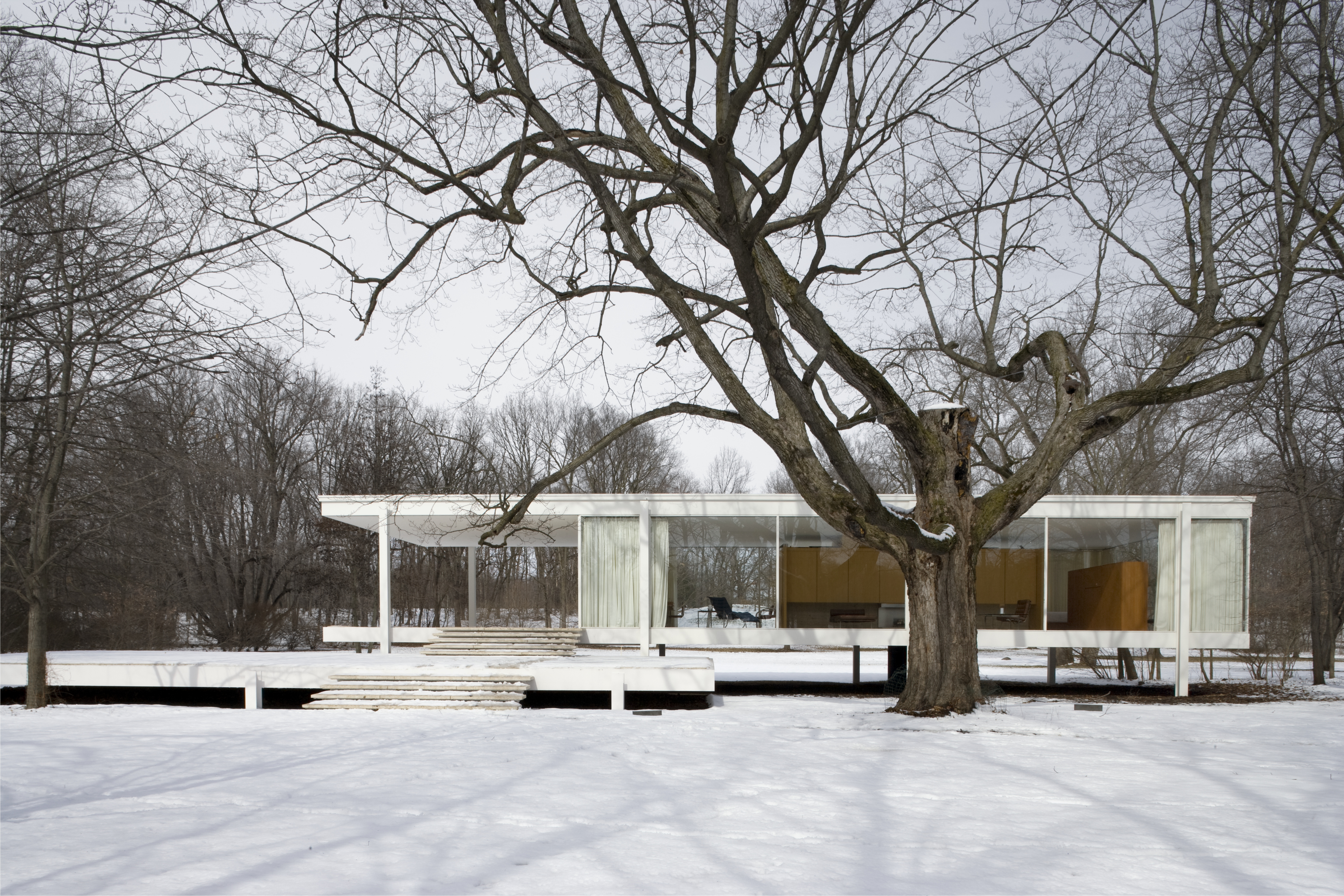
The house in 2006, seen from the south. The intermediate terrace, and the veranda at the house's floor level, are both visible on the left.

The Farnsworth House was designed by Mies in the International Style. It was his first private house in the United States and one of three private houses that Mies designed in the country. (Note: The other two houses are the McCormick House in Elmhurst, Illinois, and the Morris Greenwald House in Connecticut, both of which have a similar design.) The Farnsworth House was also one of 14 private houses he ever designed; the other 11 are in Europe. It comprises two offset rectangular floor slabs: one containing the house and its outdoor veranda, and the other containing an outdoor terrace. The house's floor slab measures 77 1/4 by 28 2/3 feet (24 by 9 m) across; (Note: Other sources cite less precise dimensions of 77 feet (23 m) across and either 28 feet (8.5 m) or 29 feet (8.8 m) wide.) these dimensions were selected to limit the house's cost, as a larger floor slab would have been more expensive. The longer west–east axis runs parallel to the Fox River, while the shorter north–south axis faces the river. The terrace is smaller (Note: The writer Werner Blaser cites the terrace as measuring 55 by 25 feet (16.8 by 7.6 m) across, while a 1951 Architectural Forum article cites its dimensions as 55 1/4 by 22 2/3 feet (17 by 7 m).) and occupies an intermediate level between the ground and the house's raised floor.

The house has a minimalist design. Steel, glass, and stone are the only materials used on the house's exterior, and wood and plaster are also used inside. Although these materials were frequently used in other buildings, they were seldom used in an abstract manner, as at the Farnsworth House. Travertine stone, in particular, was used for both the main floor slab and the terrace. Though that material was more expensive than other types of stone, Mies had chosen travertine for its ability to absorb water, and because he had used it in previous projects. The steel frame is made of rolled steel and is welded together.

The design resembled Mies's 1938 drawings for the unbuilt Resor House, located above a stream in Wyoming, as well as another unbuilt design for Margarete Hubbe in Germany. Terence Riley of MoMA said that, since neither the Resor nor Farnsworth houses touched the ground, "It's as if [Mies] left Germany and he was no longer rooted". According to the architectural historian Alice T. Friedman, the design showed that Mies and Farnsworth were both "committed not only to new architectural forms but also to new ways of living", despite Farnsworth's later doubts. Another author, William L. Hamilton, described Farnsworth as one of several women who commissioned distinctive residential designs in the mid-20th century, alongside Susan Lawrence Dana, Truus Schröder-Schräder, and Sharon Drager. Luxus Magazine wrote that, despite its minimalism, the building tried to interact with the environment in its use of an elevated steel structure and transparent walls.

=== Exterior ===
==== Stairs and terrace ====
The only access to the house is from the south. There, two flights of travertine steps connect the ground, terrace, and veranda. Both flights have 2-by-3-foot (0.61 by 0.91 m) treads; there are four steps in the lower flight and five steps in the upper flight. The treads are cantilevered from a recessed frame. There are no vertical risers between each step, giving the impression that the stairs are floating; Mies later included a similar design feature in his S. R. Crown Hall. The top tread of the upper flight is twice as deep as the other steps, likely because Farnsworth had wanted to install a mosquito screen with a door that swung outward onto the top tread. Original plans also indicate a small mound of dirt beneath the lower flight's bottom tread, possibly to prevent puddles from forming there. When the house became a museum, the treads were reinforced with steel bars.

The terrace has six steel supports, two of which are columns on the house's facade. Because of the presence of the columns, there is a small gap between the terrace and the main house. Connecting the stilts and columns are nine cross-girders, which support the terrace deck. The northeast corner of the terrace is attached to the house's southwest corner; as seen from above, this gives the impression that the terrace is sliding past the main house. Since the terrace faces west, it allowed the house's occupants to watch the sun set. The terrace slopes down toward the river, and there are drains underneath the terrace. Because of the house's location, the terrace and steps are periodically submerged in floodwater, and canoes can be moored to the terrace whenever the river floods.

==== Facade ====
The house is raised 5 feet 3 inches (1.60 m) above the ground, allowing floodwaters to run underneath. It is supported by eight H-shaped columns on the facade, which are welded to the floor slab and roof. The north and south elevations each have four columns, arranged in a 4×2 grid; the columns on each elevation are placed 22 feet (6.7 m) apart, with flanges measuring 8 inches (200 mm) deep. The columns vertically divide the north and south elevations into three bays and the west and east elevations into one bay. Each column's base is bolted to square concrete footings, while the tops of the columns are just below the roofline. Because the columns are a major part of the design, Blair Kamin described the Farnsworth House as an example of site-specific architecture. Despite its elevated position, the house itself has flooded multiple times; urban sprawl in Chicago's suburbs, which increased runoff into the river, has been cited as a contributing factor.

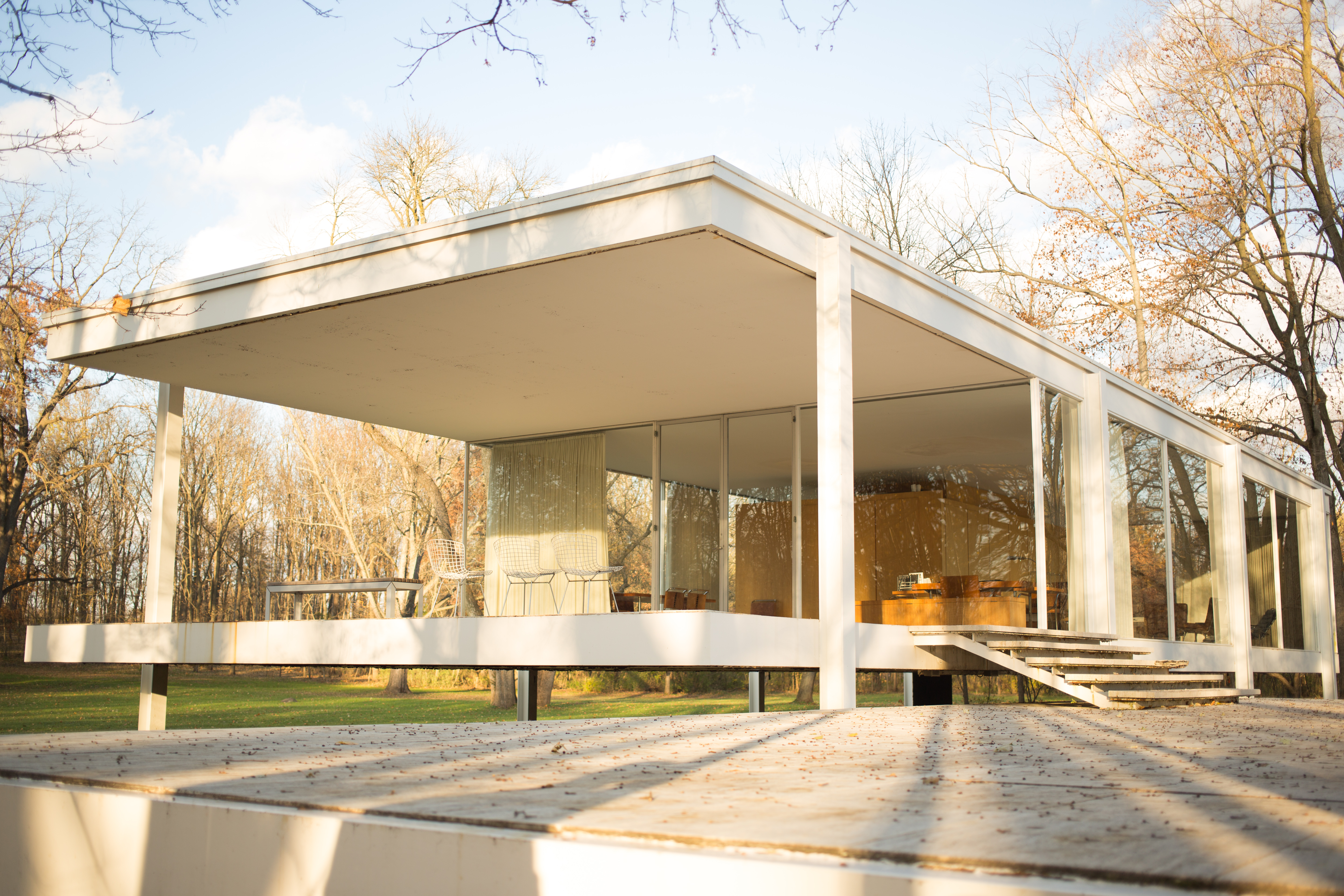
View from the terrace toward the veranda in the house's western bay

The western bay is largely unenclosed, creating an open-air veranda. Mies did not want to install mosquito screens around the veranda, but they were ultimately installed due to the prevalence of mosquitoes. On the west elevation is the main entrance, a glass double door flanked by sidelights of unequal size. Because the veranda is accessed from the south, visitors must make a 90-degree turn to reach the doors. The east elevation has one square pane at either end, flanking a central section with two small movable hopper windows beneath a large, non-movable pane. These hopper windows were not part of the original plans but were added at Farnsworth's request. The east elevation's movable panes and the doors are the only parts of the facade that could be opened, providing limited natural ventilation. On the north and south elevations, the center and eastern bays each have square panes, which are flanked by rectangular panes on either end.

Mies opted not to use insulated glazing, since it was substantially more expensive than the single-pane glass used there. The glass panes measure 1/4 inch (6.4 mm) thick. They are separated vertically by mullions and extend between the floor and roof. The mullions tie the roof and floor slabs together; the house's corners lack mullions, so the windows wrap around the corners. In a similar style to Mies's office towers, bolts and welds are concealed wherever possible, giving the impression that the beams were glued or magnetically attached to each other. Other architectural elements were fused using plug welds and are separated by grooves. All exterior metal was sandblasted to eliminate weld marks. The facade was then covered with four coats of white enamel paint, a color chosen to contrast with the landscape. The columns, roof, floor slabs, and mullions give the impression of a post-and-lintel design, similar to an Ancient Greek temple.

==== Floor and roof ====
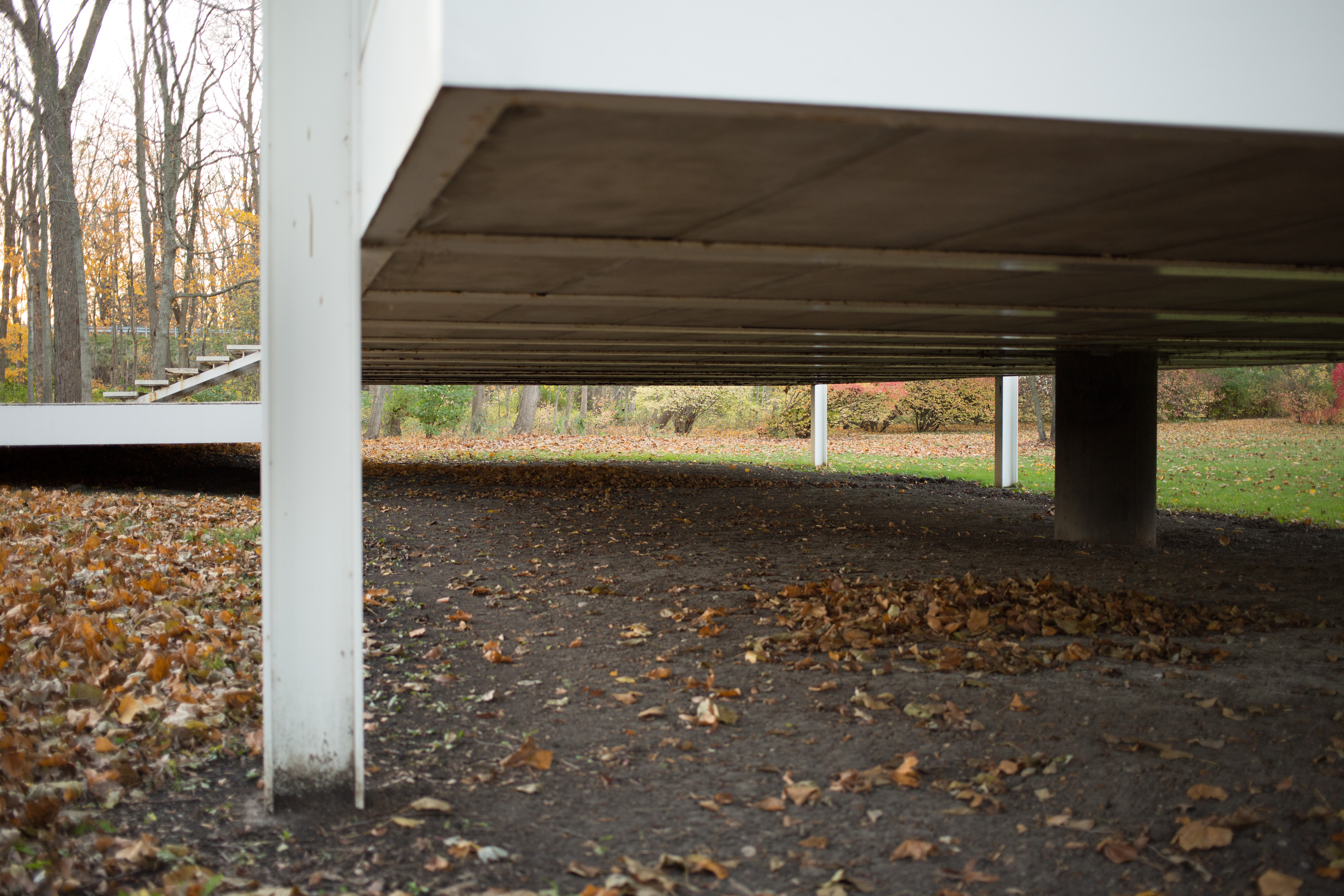
Underside of the house. At right is the cylinder carrying the house's pipes and ducts into the ground.

The floor and roof slabs both have C-shaped fascia, to which the columns are welded. The floor slab consists of precast concrete panels, which rest on steel cross-girders that connect the house's columns. There are 13 such girders under the floor slab, each spaced 5.5 feet (1.7 m) apart. Travertine slabs rest above the concrete panels. A cylinder underneath the floor slab, measuring 4 feet (1.2 m) across, carries pipes and ducts into the ground.

The roof slab is 9 1/2 feet (2.9 m) above the main floor slab and is made of precast concrete, which is placed atop steel girders connecting each pair of columns. It protrudes approximately 5.5 feet (1.7 m) beyond the westernmost and easternmost pairs of columns, being cantilevered from these columns' girders. Mies intended for the cantilevered roof to create an impression of lightness. Above the roof is a small dormer structure that contains a fireplace flue, ventilation fans, a boiler, and a water storage tank. The center of the roof slopes inward toward a drainage spout, though the slope cannot be seen from the ground level.

=== Interior ===
Floor plan of the Farnsworth House and its terrace. The veranda is marked as the "upper terrace", while the intermediate terrace is marked as the "lower terrace".

The interior covers 55 by 28 feet (16.8 by 8.5 m). (Note: One source gives an alternate figure of 55 by 29 feet (16.8 by 8.8 m), consistent with other sources that cite the deck as being 29 feet wide. Another gives a figure of 54 by 28 feet (16.5 by 8.5 m).) It is a mostly open-plan space interrupted by a central core and a movable teak wardrobe. There are no columns inside, and different parts of the house are mostly delineated by furniture. The color scheme is minimalist, with brown used for wood and white used for other surfaces. The concrete-slab floors are covered with travertine slabs, each measuring 2 by 2 3/4 feet (0.6 m × 0.8 m) across. The core is made of primavera wood, and the ceilings are finished in plaster. With an area of about 1,600 square feet (150 m^{2}), (Note: Varying figures of 1,100 square feet (100 m^{2}), 1,500 square feet (140 m^{2}), 1,584 square feet (147.2 m^{2}), 1,585 square feet (147.3 m^{2}), or 1,589 square feet (147.6 m^{2}) have been given. One source gives a figure of 2,233 square feet (207.5 m^{2}), the size of the deck.) the interior is considerably smaller than many middle-class American houses. The design is also impractical for everyday use, as it lacks basic privacy features or storage space.

==== Interior spaces ====
The core, measuring 13 by 25 feet (4.0 by 7.6 m) across, was built by a local craftsman named Karl Freund. Its primavera wood walls do not reach the ceiling, except in the middle. The core contains all of the utility ducts, as well as a utility closet, a kitchen area facing north, a fireplace facing south, and bathrooms facing west and east. The core was positioned slightly north of center, reducing the kitchen's size while providing space for a living area to the south. Farnsworth used one of the bathrooms for herself, setting aside the other for visitors. Farnsworth's bathroom, with a porcelain bathtub, was an addendum to the original plans, which called for one bathroom with a shower.

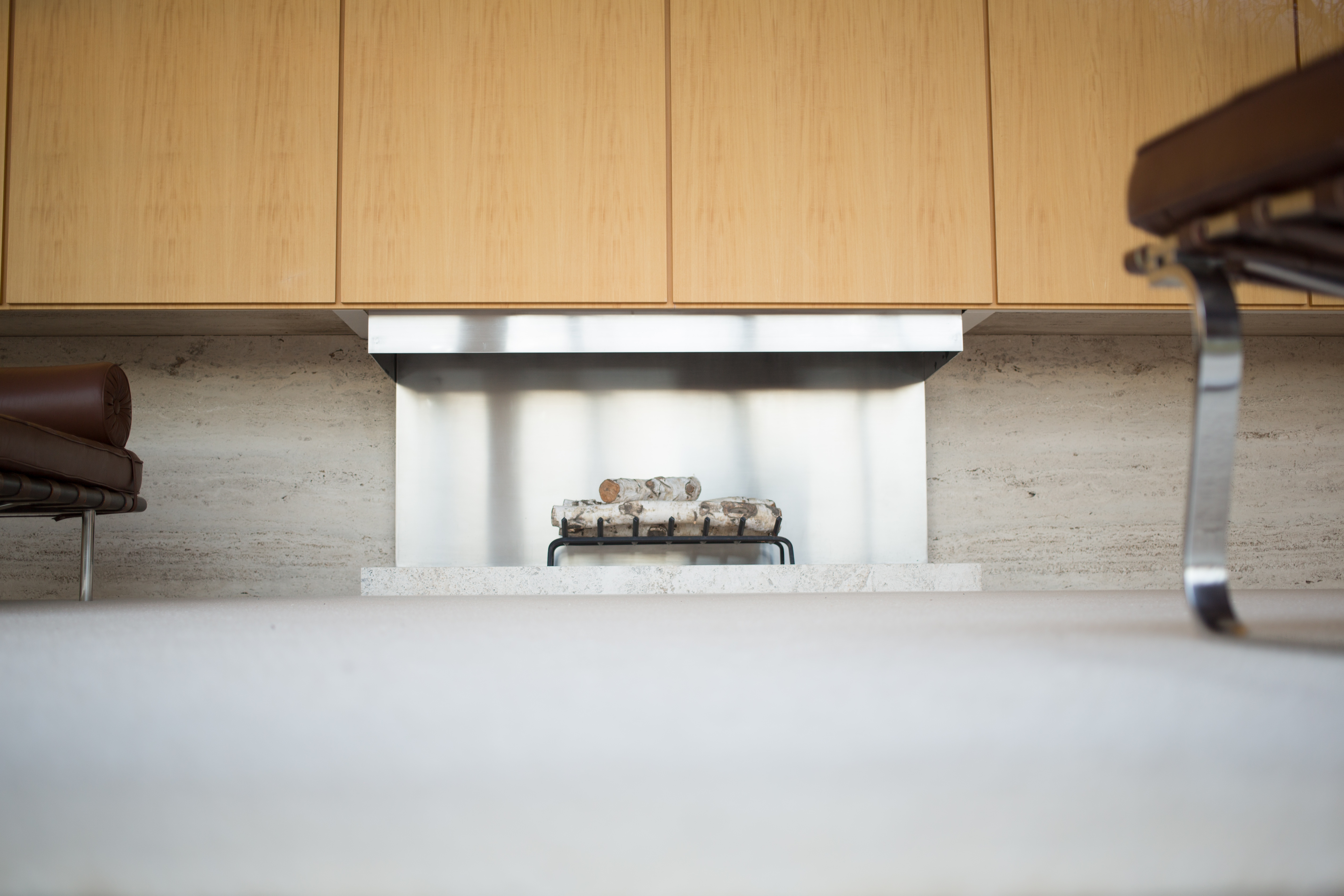
The living area's fireplace, on the southern wall of the core

The core is surrounded by a kitchen and living, dining, and sleeping areas. Short partitions extend off the core, subtly delineating various areas around it. The kitchen has a sink, a stainless-steel counter, and cooktops, and there are several cabinets above the counter. To the south is a living area abutting the fireplace in the off-center core. The living area doubled as a guest sleeping area, despite Farnsworth's wish for a dedicated second bedroom. A dining space, which doubles as an entrance area, is west of the core and living space. The teak wardrobe, east of the living area, separates it from the sleeping area. Because there were originally no curtains, the sun shone directly into the sleeping area in the morning; Farnsworth later added roller blinds, which Palumbo replaced with curtains. Because the house was intended as a weekend retreat, Mies did not build a closet, advising Farnsworth to hang her dress on the bathroom door. Farnsworth added the wardrobe later on, which remained in place when Palumbo bought the house.

==== Mechanical features ====
The travertine floor has an embedded radiant heating system with coils positioned near the floor slab's perimeter. Further heating is provided by the fireplace, for which there was originally an oil-fired boiler. There is also a furnace installed in the core, a separate boiler to heat water, and three fans to distribute hot air. For ventilation, Mies provided an exhaust fan under the kitchen floor and a ventilation shaft in the core. The floor has no drainage spouts, since Mies had anticipated that water would drain into the gaps between the travertine slabs; to catch the water, drainage troughs are placed underneath. Pipes for the bathrooms and kitchens, and utility ducts for the core, are also embedded into the floor. The electrical outlets on the floor are concealed by threaded covers. The house's lighting was designed by Richard Kelly and consists of freestanding lamps and ceiling lights.

Initially, the Farnsworth House struggled to be energy efficient. During the summer, there was no air conditioning, and the windows did not provide adequate cross-ventilation. The open windows and hot interior attracted mosquitoes and other insects, while the trees did not adequately cool the facade. The radiant heating system also took a long time to warm up, and the fireplace not only failed to provide adequate heat but also expelled ash. Ice often built up on the walls during the winter. Palumbo's 1970s renovation added air-conditioning and an electrical heater.

==== Furnishings and furniture ====
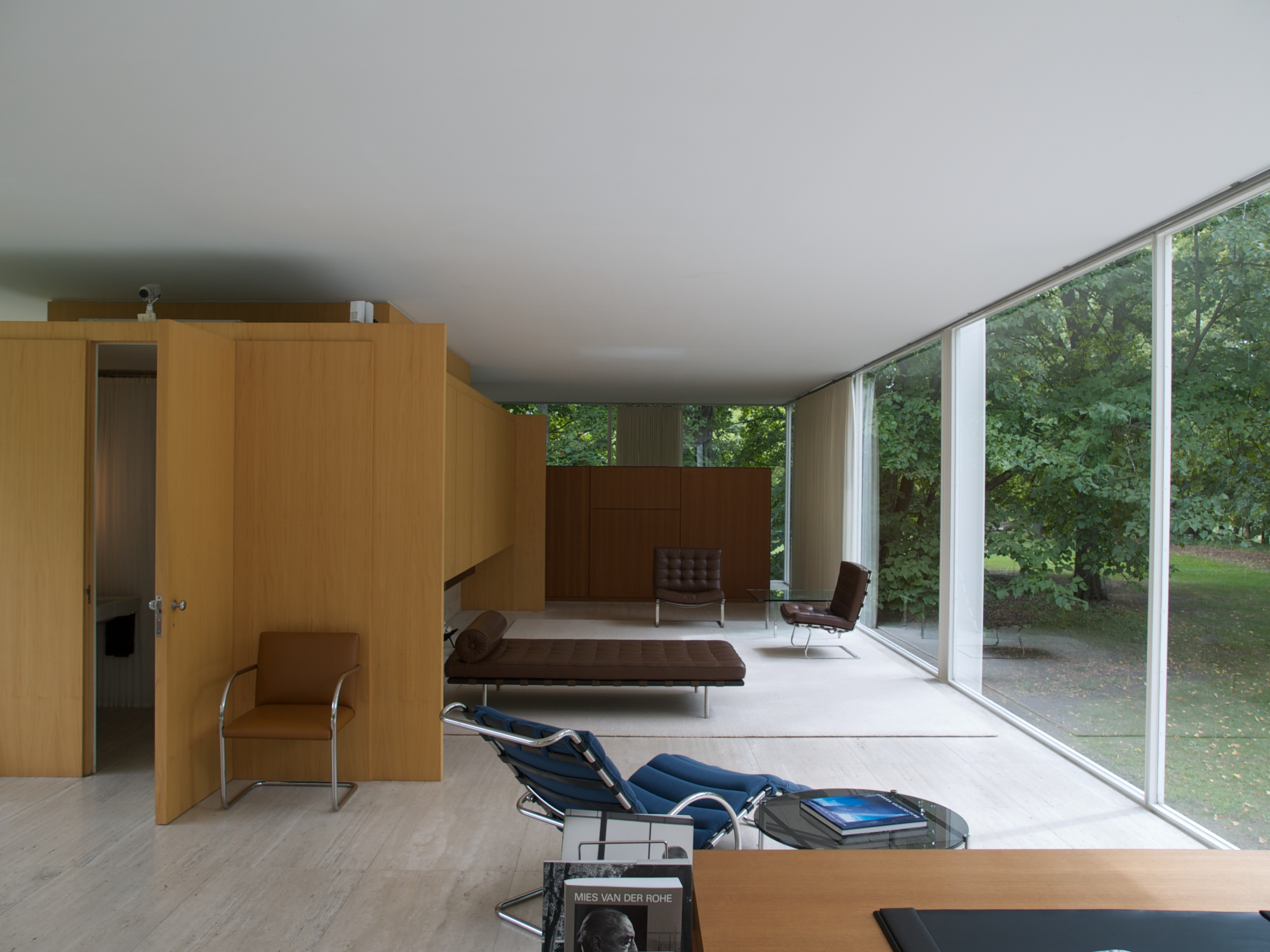
Furnishings in the living area. The west bathroom in the core is visible at left, and the wardrobe is visible in the background.

Mies had designed furniture specifically for the house, which was spartan in style and included Brno coffee tables and Barcelona chairs. Mies's furniture was intended as an integral part of the design, to the point where he spent considerable effort determining its proportions, location, and materials. Mies wanted his furniture to be installed at specific points, delineating different areas, but Farnsworth had refused to use these pieces. As she said: "The fact is that Mies has no taste and if you stop to think about it, that is not surprising."

When Farnsworth lived there, she owned objects such as North African rugs, Chinese art, and Danish furniture. Her bed abutted the core's eastern wall, facing the Fox River. These furnishings included designs from Alvar Aalto, Harry Bertoia, Bruno Mathsson, Jens Risom, and Knoll, Inc.. The design made no provision for the exhibition of artwork, though Farnsworth did display her family photographs.

When Palumbo bought the house, he hired Mies's grandson Dirk Lohan to design custom furniture inspired by Mies's designs. Lohan constructed coffee tables, Brno chairs, and replicas of leather-and-steel ottomans from the Barcelona Pavilion. Other pieces in the house included a brown leather couch from one of Palumbo's previous residences and a Moroccan rug. Palumbo also commissioned a desk, dining table, bed frame, nightstand, and boot box from Lohan. Different pieces of furniture divided the distinct areas. For example, the dining area was marked by a table and chairs, while the living space had a Barcelona bed next to the fireplace. Palumbo displayed his family pictures when he lived there, and he also displayed sculptures on side tables. At one point, the house had shantung draperies, which were replaced when a flood destroyed the original draperies.

== Management and operation ==
The Farnsworth House is open to the public, with tours conducted by the National Trust. Organizations such as the Chicago Architecture Foundation also provide tours that include the house. When the National Trust first took over the house, it offered one-hour guided tours. The house is open to the general public from April to November and is accessible only by appointment during other months. Tours begin at the visitor center, where there are exhibits and a short film, as well as a gift shop. Afterward, guests walk through the woods to reach the house. To avoid damaging one of the house's rugs, visitors must take off their shoes or put booties on their shoes while inside the house. Nighttime tours are hosted once a month.

Due to the house's small size, it can accommodate only ten visitors simultaneously. The National Trust first displayed Farnsworth's decor at the house in 2020. Since then, the National Trust has swapped out the furnishings periodically, switching between modernist decor that reflects Palumbo's tastes and more eclectic items that reflect Farnsworth's tastes. As of 2024, the house has 10,000 annual visitors. The grounds can be rented out for events such as weddings, and the National Trust also hosts various programs at the house to raise money. Since 2024, the house has hosted the Farnsworth Fall Festival.

== Impact ==
=== Reception ===
The house's minimalist architecture has been discussed extensively. The architectural historian Arthur Drexler described the house as consisting of merely "a terrace, a floor, and a roof". Because the house is raised, sources have describe it as hovering over the landscape. Some sources characterized the design as insular, stating that it was effectively detached from the landscape outside, while other sources stated that the facade blurred the distinction between exterior and interior. Observers likened the house to a Shinto shrine, an 18th-century pavilion, or a Japanese garden. The glass exterior was also described as a culmination of three decades of increasingly minimalist designs, while the elevated floor slab and white frame have drawn comparisons to ghosts.

Alice T. Friedman said in 1998 that the Farnsworth House was one of a few 20th-century residences, along with Fallingwater and Villa Savoye, which consistently captivated visitors despite being widely covered in the media. Another writer for Curbed classified Fallingwater, the Farnsworth House, the Glass House, and Eero Saarinen's Miller House as American modernist icons, "glorified in equal part by architecture geeks and tourists".

==== Contemporary ====
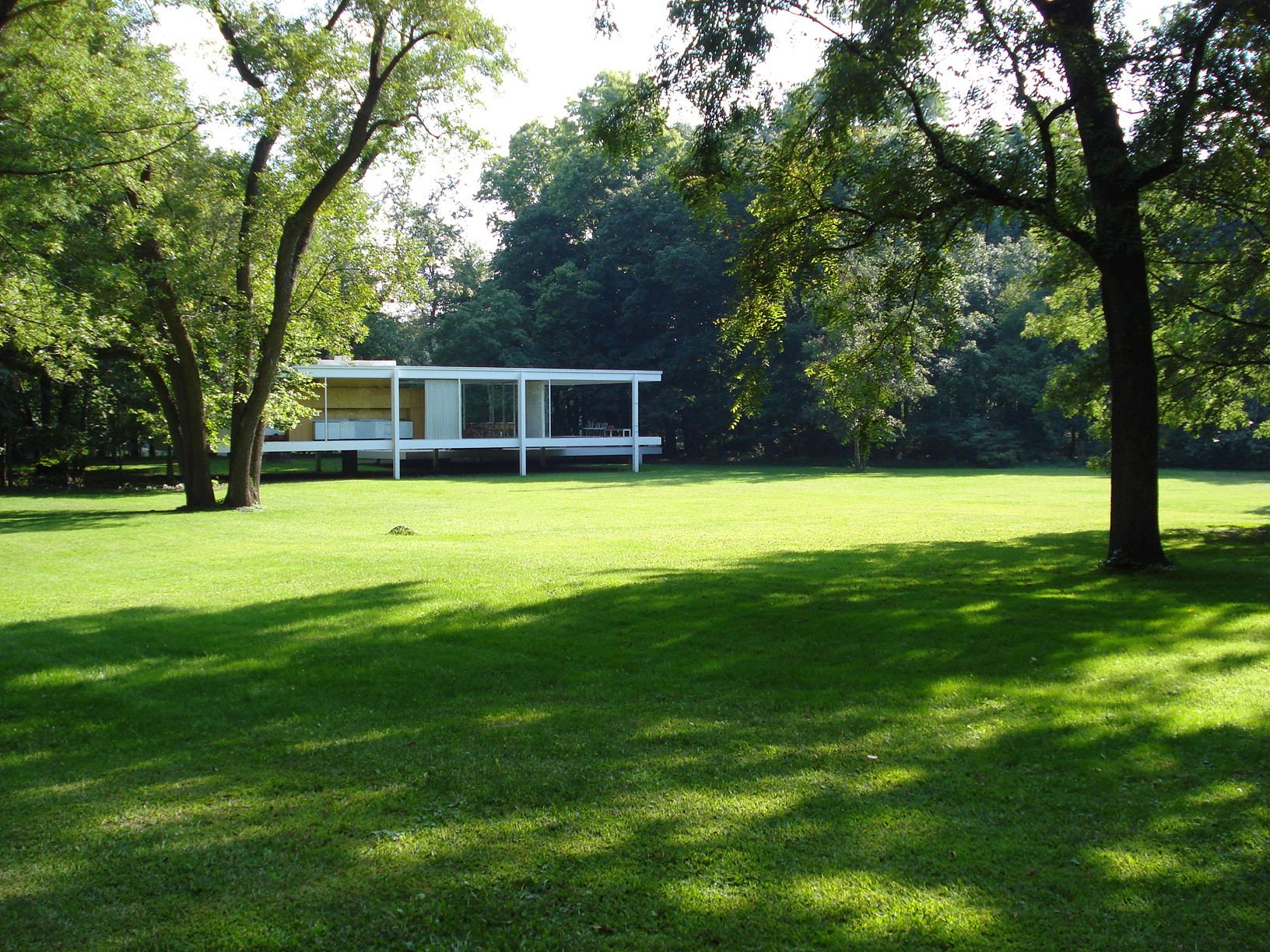
View from the north in 2009

When the house was completed, it was controversial, in part because of the dispute between Mies and Farnsworth. Peter Blake of Architectural Forum said in 1951 that the Farnsworth House "has no equal in perfection of workmanship, in precision of detail, in pure simplicity of concept", although he nonetheless stated that the house might not appeal to certain groups of people. The house was also depicted on the cover of Architectural Design magazine, and a reviewer for that publication said the design was "quiet and simple in character", being "unobtrusive" to the occupants. House & Garden praised the house as "a structure of implacable calm, precise simplicity, and meticulous detail", while The Age of Melbourne said the design was successful for its simplicity and purity despite being impractical for wider use. Another review from 1953 called it "a quantity of air caught between a floor and a roof", while Arthur Drexler wrote in 1960 that the house was "one of the most dramatic statements of the Miesian idea".

House Beautiful magazine published a particularly critical article in April 1953, in which its editor Elizabeth Gordon interviewed Farnsworth and described the house as "cold" and "barren", calling it an affront to American values. The magazine's executive editor Joseph Barry called Farnsworth's residence "a particularly fine example of a bad modern house". Gordon and other detractors implied (if not outright stated) that the design had communist connotations, at a time when McCarthyism caused Americans to disdain anything thought to be communist. These detractors included the architect Frank Lloyd Wright, who unlike many of his contemporaries had liked Gordon's article and compared the house's style to totalitarianism. Gordon's review spurred negative reactions from other architects (including those she had previously praised) and the architectural press. The review and its aftermath prompted Mies to end his friendship with Wright and to consider suing House Beautiful's publisher Hearst Communications, as he feared the article would negatively impact his business.

The design highlighted the differing philosophies held by what Newsweek described as "the moderate humanists and the strict geometricists", and observers had mixed opinions about the design's simplicity and attention to detail. Writing in 1963, James Marston Fitch struggled to reconcile criticisms of the details and praise for his minimalist design, saying that it was like "praising the sea for being blue while chiding it for being salty, or admiring the tiger for the beauty of his coat while urging him to become a vegetarian". Upon Mies's 80th birthday in 1965, a writer for the periodical Universitas described the house as "exceedingly demanding as a structure and ascetic as regards the amenities", with its impact yet to be determined.

==== Retrospective ====
After Mies's death in 1969, criticism of his work became less intense. The historian Reyner Banham called it an "extreme statement" that "left other architects little to do except to try to make even more perfect that which was already perfected". When Palumbo owned the property, the Financial Times described the house as "an indisputable masterpiece and in meticulous state", contrasting with other wealthy people's gaudy structures. Paul Goldberger wrote that the house had "a brilliant clarity of vision, a potent sense of architectural space that forces us to see the world anew", despite its lack of traditional rooms, and he later said it had "utter magnificence" but no privacy. Paul Gapp wrote in 1985 that the house was among the world's "most architecturally celebrated residences". The critic John Bentley Mays, writing in 1991, praised the building as a "simple, exquisitely proportioned oblong box" but criticized the restrictiveness of the design, which originally excluded space for art, curtains, or even mosquito screens.

A New York Times writer in 2003 contrasted the house with "the suburbs rolling toward it", while The Australian regarded the design's "advanced intentions and clever interpretation of materials" favorably, despite the un-ergonomic surfaces. A Wall Street Journal article called it "part fishbowl, part tree house and part transparent time capsule". By contrast, a writer for The International Design Magazine thought the house "suggested loneliness" because it lacked connection to the ground. Maritz Vandenberg thought the design succeeded as an example of Mies's architectural principles and as an icon, but that it was structurally flawed, used materials inefficiently, and could not feasibly be mass-produced.

The house has been described as one of Mies's most significant U.S. buildings. Blair Kamin wrote in 2001 that the house was among Mies's "masterpieces", while Newsweek said the house "embodies almost everything for which Mies is revered" because of its materials, classical design influences, and elevated position. The critic Paul Goldberger wrote in 2004 that the Farnsworth House "deserve[s] to be ranked with the greatest buildings of all time", citing its simple yet "utterly composed" design. Observers have also characterized the house as more an expression of Mies's architectural philosophy than a practical residential design. For example, the architects Jacques Herzog and Pierre de Meuron, wrote that the house was "much more the expression of a will and a conviction that something great must be created and that this was the moment to do so". The Wall Street Journal wrote that the house "came close to perfectly embodying his motto, 'beinahe nichts', or 'almost nothing'", while Dirk Lohan said the design was the "ideal retreat" for his grandfather.

=== Architectural influence ===
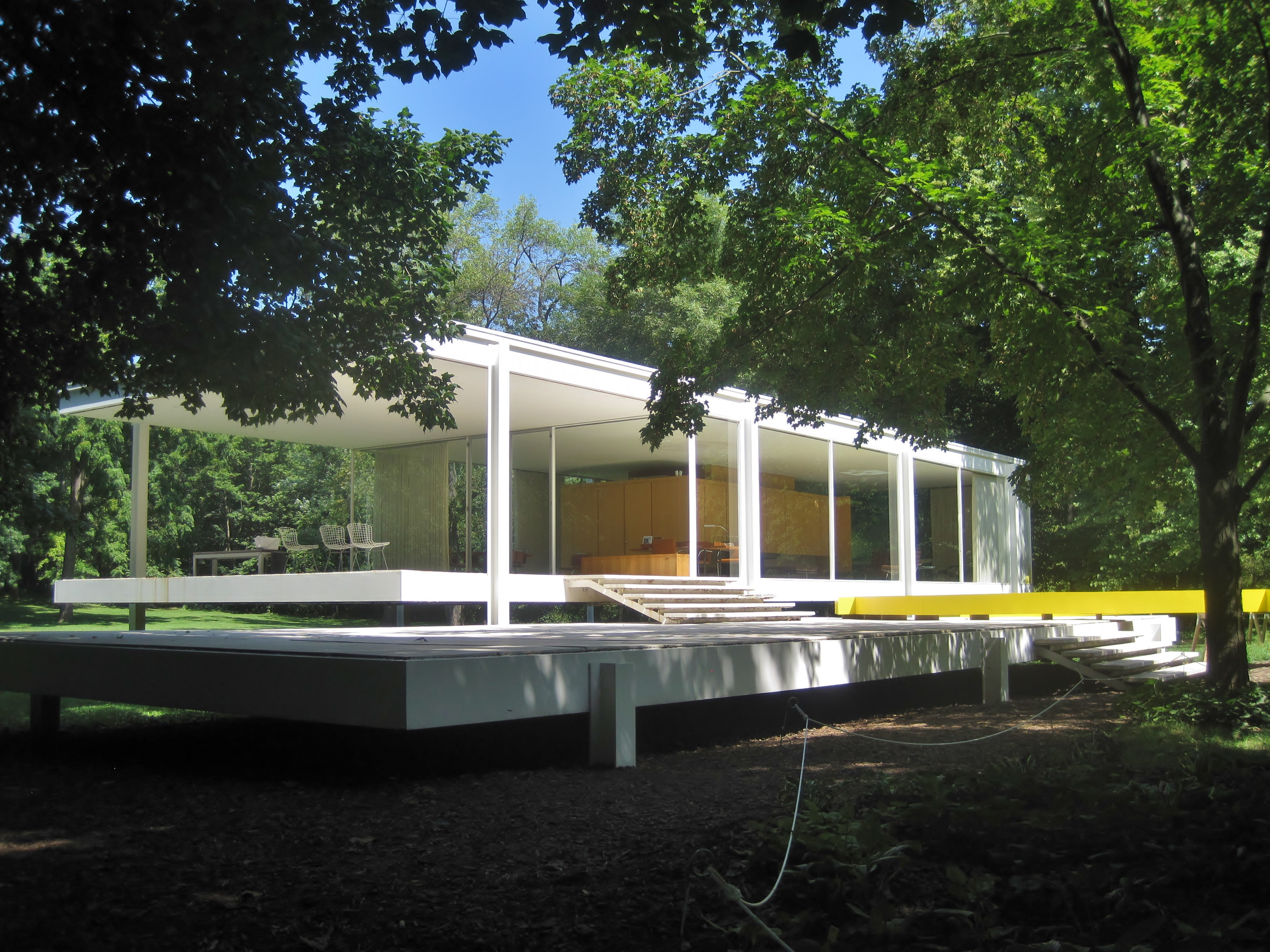
The house has been cited as a major work of 20th-century residential architecture, as well as a major modernist and International-style work.

The house has been cited as a major work of 20th-century residential architecture, as well as a major modernist and International-style work. In 1968, Fello Atkinson cited the Farnsworth House as one of three highly influential Mies designs, along with the Illinois Institute of Technology Academic Campus and 860–880 Lake Shore Drive. The writer David A. Spaeth said in 1985 that the house's impact "cannot be overestimated however much it was (and is) discussed and debated", while the critic David Holowka said its influence was comparable to the novel Huckleberry Finn's impact on modern American literature. Beam cites the Farnsworth House, and other modernist designs by Mies, as having influenced the work of U.S. West Coast architects such as John Entenza. Franz Schulze characterized the Farnsworth House as one of Mies's most important residential works, along with the Villa Tugendhat of 1930.

The postmodernist architect Philip Johnson cited the Farnsworth House as an influence for his Glass House in Connecticut, which was completed first but was reportedly inspired by an architectural model of Mies's design. Though both houses have an open plan and glass walls, Johnson's house differed in key respects such as its classical influence, dark-colored frame, and ground-level positioning. Other buildings have been inspired by the Farnsworth House's design, such as the Stahl House and Rosen House in California, a weekend house in New York's Hudson Valley, and works by the Australian architect Glenn Murcutt. The Farnsworth House also inspired residential works in other countries such as Australia, Canada, Israel, Ireland, England, and Belgium.

The Farnsworth House significantly influenced Mies's own architecture as well. For example, his design for Crown Hall used a steel-and-glass facade with cantilevered stairs, while 860–880 Lake Shore Drive rests on stilts. Other details inspired by the house included Mies's frequent use of glass curtain walls and his tendency to design open-plan interiors subdivided by furniture and art. Wishing to mass-produce the Farnsworth House's design, Mies devised the 50x50 House, a glass-walled structure with a square floor plan, a utility core, and columns at the center of each elevation. The 50x50 plan (along with variants of different sizes) was never produced, as it failed to provide sufficient storage space, privacy, or a flexible floor layout. Though he designed many large public buildings in his later career, he stopped designing private residences after the early 1950s.

=== Awards and landmark designations ===
In a 1976 poll of American-architecture experts, several experts ranked the Farnsworth House among the United States' best buildings. The American Institute of Architects (AIA) gave the Farnsworth House a Twenty-five Year Award for architectural excellence in 1981. Craig Ellwood, one of the Twenty-five Year Award panelists, said that "the nonsense we now call architecture" paled in comparison to the Farnsworth House. Lohan Associates won an AIA honor award for their 1990s restoration of the house. In celebration of the 2018 Illinois Bicentennial, the Farnsworth House was selected as one of Illinois's 200 great places by the AIA's statewide chapter, AIA Illinois, and was recognized as one of AIA Illinois's "25 Must See Buildings". In 2021, The New York Times named it as one of the 25 most significant works of architecture since World War II. The house received lower rankings from the general public; a survey in 2007 found that it was not among Americans' 150 favorite buildings.

Despite its architectural influence, the building was not eligible for inclusion on the National Register of Historic Places (NRHP) until the 2000s, largely due to a regulation that requires most NRHP listings to be at least 50 years old. In 2006, the house was added to the NRHP when it was designated as a National Historic Landmark.

=== Media and exhibits ===
The Museum of Modern Art displayed plans of the house in 1947, and the museum featured the house again in a 1953 exhibition and accompanying book about postwar architecture. The house was the subject of other exhibitions, including MoMA's 1950s traveling exhibition about 20th-century houses, a 1982 exhibit by the Arts Club of Chicago, a 2000 exhibit by the Chicago Architecture Foundation, and Phyllis Lambert's 2000s traveling exhibition Mies in America. Two exhibits in particular, in the 1970s and 2003, helped bring attention to the house. The relationship between Mies and Farnsworth inspired Alanah Fitch's play Jessie and the Fat Man and June Finfer's play Glass House.

When the Farnsworth House became a museum, it was the subject of Saved From the Wrecking Ball, a documentary produced by PBS. The house's history has been discussed in several books, including The Farnsworth House (1997) by Franz Schulze, Broken Glass (2020) by Alex Beam, The Edith Farnsworth House: Architecture, Preservation, Culture (2024) by Michelangelo Sabatino, and Almost Nothing (2025) by Nora Wendl. Its maintenance was discussed in Sarah Morris's 2010 film Points on a Line. A movie about the house, starring Jeff Bridges as Mies and Maggie Gyllenhaal as Farnsworth, was announced in 2017. Although the film has not been released as of 2025, both of the leading roles were recast, with Ralph Fiennes as Mies and Elizabeth Debicki as Farnsworth.

The house has been rented out as a filming location, appearing in media such as a jeans commercial and a Kenny Chesney music video. The estate has been used for site-specific art and performances. These include a light show in 2014 and 2019 by the art collective Luftwerk, as well as a 2025 multimedia exhibit called Inhabit. In addition, the design was partly replicated in Michigan for the filming of the 2016 movie Batman v Superman: Dawn of Justice. The house has also inspired creative works, including a video installation by the artist Iñigo Manglano-Ovalle, a butterfly house by the artist group Bik van der Pol, and the multimedia show Modern Living by Brennan Gerard and Ryan Kelly.

== See also ==
- National Register of Historic Places listings in Kendall County, Illinois
- List of National Historic Landmarks in Illinois
