= Edith Farnsworth =

American nephrologist (1903–1977)

Farnsworth, c. 1940

Edith Brooks Farnsworth (November 17, 1903 – December 4, 1977) was an American nephrologist known for her research on kidney disease and for her involvement in the design of the Farnsworth House, which she commissioned from Ludwig Mies van der Rohe.

== Early life ==
Edith Farnsworth was born on November 17, 1903, in Chicago, Illinois, to George James Farnsworth, a successful lumber manufacturer, and Mary Alice Brooks Farnsworth. Raised in a culturally rich and financially comfortable household, she cultivated early interests in music, language, and science. Farnsworth studied literature and zoology at the University of Chicago and later pursued violin and music theory at the American Conservatory of Music. Her dedication to the violin eventually led her to Rome for further study and immersion in Italian culture. Though she considered a career in music, she ultimately chose to pursue medicine. In 1934, at the age of 30, she entered Northwestern University Medical School, where she was one of only four women in her class.

== Career ==
Earning her medical degree in 1938 and later obtaining a Master of Science degree in 1941, she focused on endocrine relations in pregnancy toxemias. Specializing in nephrology, she became an associate professor of medicine at Passavant Hospital, where she eventually had her own lab to conduct groundbreaking research on kidney diseases and see patients. In 1946, she published on renal reabsorption of chloride and phosphate, and in 1948, she gained national recognition for being the first to use adrenocorticotropic hormone (ACTH) to treat nephritis and nephrosis. Throughout the 1940s and 1950s, she published extensively on kidney disease, hypertension, congestive heart failure, and edema treatment.

== Farnsworth House ==
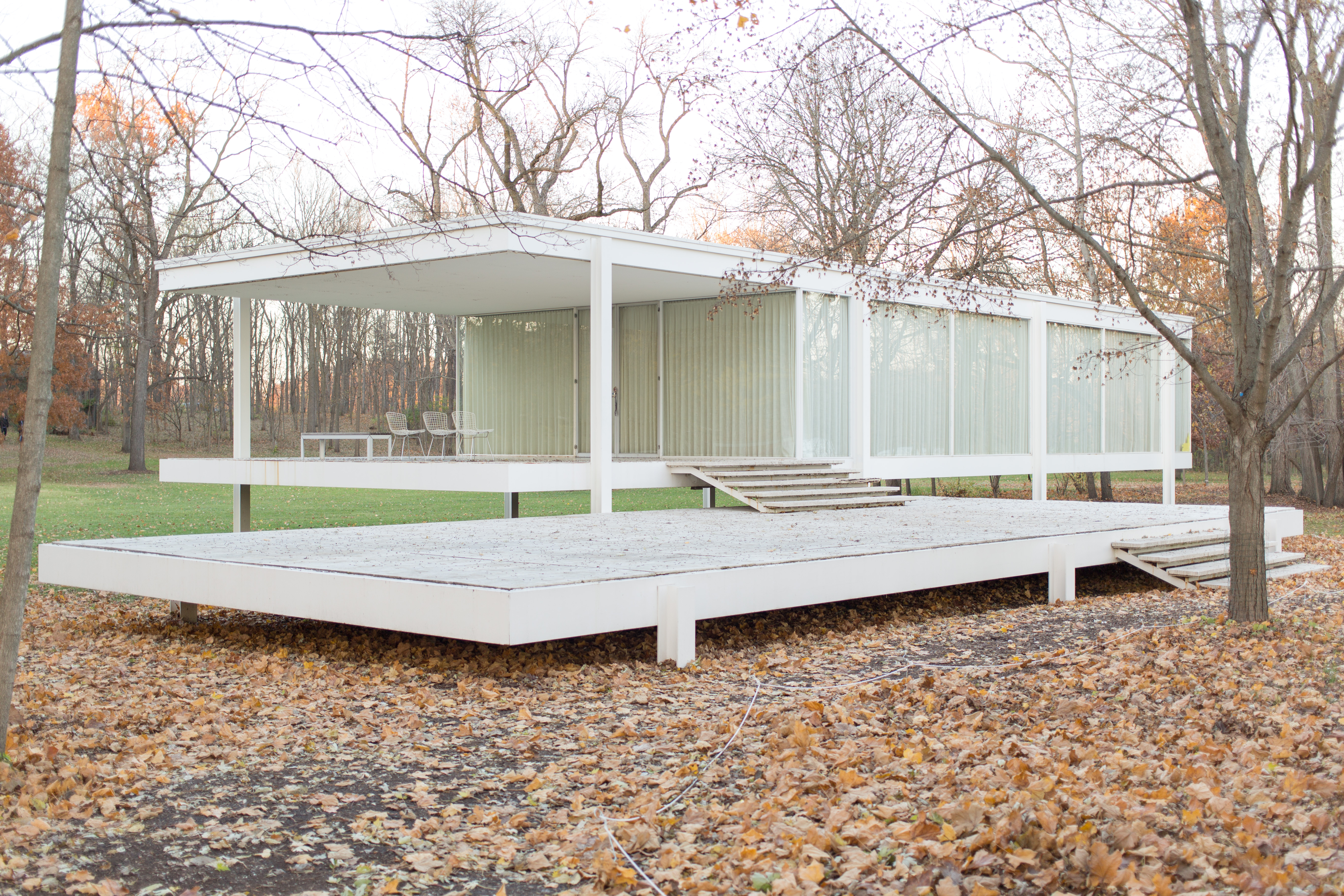
The Edith Farnsworth House's exterior

In 1945, Farnsworth conceptualized what would become the Farnsworth House. Because of her busy and demanding career, she wanted a getaway house as a retreat from her life. She bought a plot of land on the Fox River in Plano, Illinois from Colonel McCormick, seeking to create a serene weekend retreat, and commissioned the renowned architect Mies van der Rohe to design a modernist countryside residence on the site. The resulting structure, with its striking all-glass exterior, was designed to maximize the natural beauty of its surroundings. As a weekend home, the layout intentionally omitted extensive storage, as it was not intended for permanent living. Mies was the type of architect who demanded complete control over every building project he took on, and the house became an expression of his architectural ideas rather than a space designed for living. When Farnsworth eventually voiced concerns, van der Rohe reportedly said “stick to your nephritis.” The building was completed in 1951, and in a piece published in Architectural Forum that year it was referred to as "Mies van der Rohe's House."

Final costs ran nearly twice the original estimate of $40,000, costing $74,000. After nearly five years in court, the matter was settled out of court with Farnsworth paying a smaller sum. Because of press attention, both Farnsworth and van der Rohe were treated with “incredulity and derision” for the costly building project and “crowds of people came on weekends to look at the house," taking away its purpose as a solitary retreat.

For approximately 20 years, Farnsworth enjoyed her weekends at the minimalist steel and glass residence. High building costs and arguments with the architect led to Farnsworth suing Mies after the completion of the building. Farnsworth had imagined the Farnsworth House as a retreat, but its wide open window plan made it far less private than Farnsworth had hoped for. She sold the house in 1971 to Lord Peter Palumbo, also citing the construction of a nearby bridge and roadway, which diminished the house's rustic charm. Palumbo later auctioned the house in 2003, when it was acquired by the National Trust for Historic Preservation. Today, the Farnsworth House is preserved as a historic landmark and is open to the public for guided tours.

== Personal life ==
Farnsworth was fluent in Italian and French, and she knew some German. In the years of her retirement (1967–1977), she moved to the small town of Bagno a Ripolie, in Italy and became well known for translating Italian poetry into English, including the works of Eugenio Montale, Albino Pierro, and Salvatore Quasimodo. She also wrote her own personal poetry, took photographs of her friends and family, and recorded her memoirs. Farnsworth died on December 5, 1977. Her ashes were returned to America, where she is buried in Graceland Cemetery, Chicago.

== Bibliography ==
- Beam, Alex (2020). Broken Glass: Mies van der Rohe, Edith Farnsworth, and the Fight over a Modernist Masterpiece. New York: Random House. ISBN 978-0-399-59271-3. OCLC 1104860779
- Filler, Martin (2021). Life in a Glass House. The New York Review. (accessed April 27, 2025).
- Friedman, Alice T. (2006). Women and the Making of the Modern House: a Social and Architectural History. New Haven (Conn.): Yale University Press. ISBN 978-0-300-11789-9.
- Sabatino, Michelangelo (2024). The Edith Farnsworth House: Architecture, Preservation, Culture. London: Phaidon. ISBN 978-1-58093-619-4
- Wendl, Nora (2025). Almost Nothing: Reclaiming Edith Farnsworth. Chicago: University of Illinois Press. ISBN 978-0-252-04797-8
