= Alice T. Friedman =

American architectural historian (born 1950)

- Born: September 28, 1950 (age 76); Boston, Massachusetts, U.S.
- Known for: Art history, architectural history

Alice T. Friedman is an American architectural historian and the Grace Slack McNeil Professor Emerita of American Art and Professor Emerita of Art at Wellesley College. She specializes in modern architecture and the history of American design, concentrating on the issues of gender and sexuality in architectural patronage.

== Education and career ==
Friedman graduated with a B.A. from Radcliffe College in 1972; an M.Phil. from the Warburg Institute, University of London, in 1974; an M.A. from Harvard University in 1975; as well as a Ph.D. from Harvard in 1980.

Friedman taught at Wellesley College from 1979 to 2023. She served as the Co-Director of the Architecture Program from 1983 to 2022 and the Director of the McNeil Program for Studies in American Art and Architecture from 2005 to 2022. She has also taught in a visiting capacity for the Massachusetts Institute of Technology, Harvard University (at the Graduate School of Design), and the Modern Interiors Research Centre at Kingston University in London.

While at Wellesley College, Friedman was awarded the 2021 Pinanski Teaching Prize. She was named a Fellow of the Society of Architectural Historians in 2020.

In addition to teaching, Friedman has served as an advisor to museums, including the Frank Lloyd Wright Usonian Houses Project at the Currier Museum of Art (2020–21) and “Floating Palaces” at the National Building Museum (2013–15). She also curated two exhibitions at the Davis Museum at Wellesley College: “Consuming Passions: Photography and the Object” (1998) and “Home is Where” (1996).

Friedman has written four books: House and Household in Elizabethan England: Wollaton Hall and the Willoughby Family (University of Chicago Press, 1989), Women and the Making of the Modern House: A Social and Architectural History (Harry N. Abrams, 1998, and re-published in paperback by Yale University Press, 2007), American Glamour and the Evolution of Modern Architecture (Yale University Press, 2010), and Queer Moderns: Max Ewing's Jazz Age New York (Princeton University Press, 2025).

Friedman’s work has influenced the study of architectural history in significant ways, as recognized by The American Academy in Rome, The New York Times, Women Writing Architecture, and the European Iconic Houses Network. For over forty years, Friedman has served as a lecturer and critic in the United States and Europe, including, most recently, at Princeton University School of Architecture, the Fay Jones School of Architecture at the University of Arkansas, and University of Toronto.

== Awards and fellowships ==
- LGBT Studies Research Fellowship, Yale University (2023)
- Pinanski Teaching Prize, Wellesley College (2021)
- Fellow, Society of Architectural Historians (2020)
- Rea S. Hederman Critic in Residence, American Academy in Rome (2019)
- Arcus | Places Prize for Scholarship on Gender, Sexuality and the Built Environment, U.C. Berkeley, College of Environmental Design (2014–15)
- Radcliffe Institute Exploratory Seminar Grant: “Sacred Space in a Secular Nation of Believers” (with Professor Wendy Cadge, Sociology, Brandeis University) (2012)
- Graham Foundation for Advanced Studies in Fine Arts (2010)
- Honorary Fellow, Boston Society of Architects (AIA) (2005)
- Fellowship, National Endowment for the Humanities (1995–96)
- Fellow, John Simon Guggenheim Memorial Foundation (1995)

== Selected articles ==
- "Feminist Architectural History 2.0" (with Nora Wendl), in Dana Arnold, ed. Women and Architectural History: The Monstrous Regiment Then and Now (Routledge, 2024), 131–150.
- "Interior Decorator is Dead," The Art Bulletin 106, no. 1 (March 2024), 34–38.
- "Brother and I in Bed: Queer Photography at Home in New York," in John Potvin, ed. The Senses in Interior Design: Sensorial Expressions and Experiences (Manchester: Manchester University Press, 2023), 69–85.
- "Barbie Queen of the Prom," in Chad Randl and D. Medina Lasansky, eds. Playing Place: Board Games, Popular Culture, Space (Cambridge: MIT Press, 2023).
- "Dancing Across the Threshold: Privacy and the Home in the Time of Covid-19," in Penny Sparke, Ersi Ioannidou, Pat Kirkham, Stephen Knott, and Jana Scholze, eds. Interiors in the Era of Covid-19 (London: Bloomsbury, 2023).
- "Public Face and Private Space in the Design of Contemporary Houses," in Swati Chattopadhyay and Jeremy White, eds. The Routledge Companion to Critical Approaches to Contemporary Architecture (Routledge, 2020).
- "F the U-Haul: Janet Flanner's Paris and the Varieties of Lesbian Domesticity," in Brent Pilkey, Rachel Scicluna, Ben Campkin, Barbara Penner, eds. Sexuality and Gender at Home: Experience, Politics, Transgression (Routledge, 2017).
- "Girl Talk: Feminism and Domestic Architecture at Wright’s Oak Park Studio,” in David Van Zanten, ed. Marion Mahony Reconsidered (Chicago: University of Chicago Press, 2011).
- "Frank Lloyd Wright and Feminism: Mamah Borthwick's Letters to Ellen Key," Journal of the Society of Architectural Historians 61, no. 2 (June 2002), 140–151.
- "Architecture, Authority, and the Female Gaze: Planning and Representation in the Early Modern Country House," Assemblage no. 18 (August 1992), 40–61.

== Bibliography ==
- Queer Moderns: Max Ewing's Jazz Age New York, Princeton University Press, 2025. ISBN 978-0-69126-734-0
- American Glamour and the Evolution of Modern Architecture, Yale University Press, 2010. ISBN 978-0-30011-654-0
- Women and the Making of the Modern House: A Social and Architectural History, Harry N. Abrams, 1998; Yale University Press, 2007 ISBN 0810939894 ISBN 978-0-30011-789-9
- Elizabethan England: Wollaton Hall and the Willoughby Family, University of Chicago Press, 1989. ISBN 978-0-22626-329-8
- Dream Houses Toy Homes exhibition catalogue, Canadian Centre for Architecture, 1995.
- Spaces of Faith (edited with Anne Massey), Interiors: Design, Architecture, Culture, volume 6 issue 3 (2015/16)
