= Site-specific architecture =

Site-specific architecture (SSA) is architecture which is of its time and of its place. It is designed to respond to both its physical context, and the metaphysical context within which it has been conceived and executed. The physical context will include its location, local materials, planning framework, building codes, whilst the metaphysical context will include the client's aspirations, community values, and architects ideas about the building type, client, location, building use, etc.

== History ==
The first examples seen of site-specific architecture orient around Spain, Italy and China in ancient cave and cliff dwellings dating back to the Neolithic period. Architecture of the Neolithic period is the first example of site-specific architecture, the buildings being dedicated to religion or social practices. Buildings of this time were made for purposes beyond the physical constructs but rather for the significance of the site they were created on. These early examples of site-specific architecture can be seen to use local materials that were available to humans at the time such as clay, stone, tree trunks and mudbrick. This use of natural elements allows the structures to seamlessly blend into their environments.

Following this period there was a move towards more ornamental architectural structures as seen in the Roman and Byzantine era.

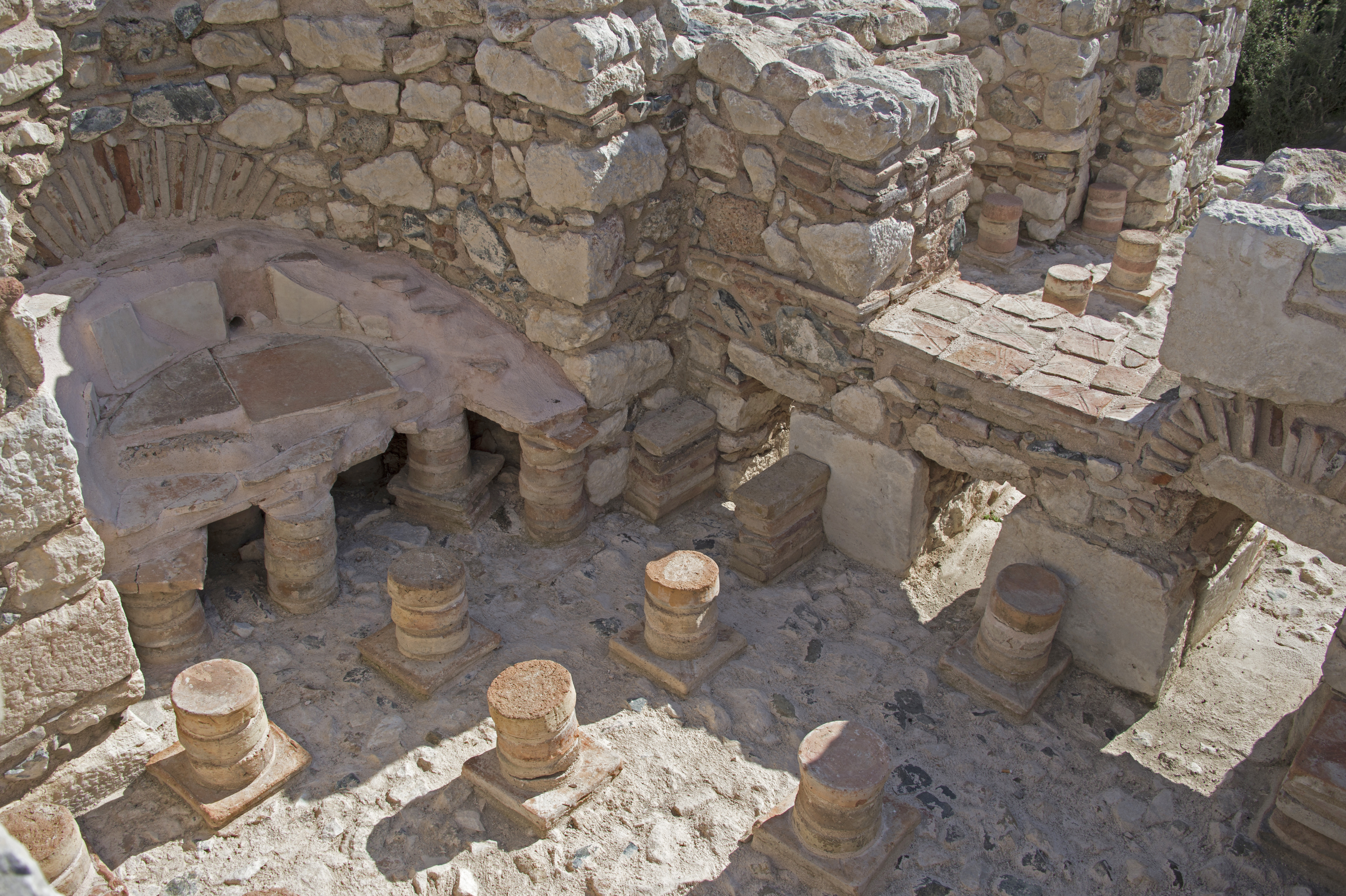
Kibyra East Roman bath 9929

For several centuries architecture was concerned mainly with decorative and cosmetic structures that stood out from their environments. This was for example seen in the Renaissance period, whereby structures were dedicated to symmetry and proportion rather than organic lines and shapes.

More recent iterations of architectural styles eventually moved away from the styles of classical architecture as moved towards modernism. This shift happened as a result of art periods such as the Bauhaus and De Stijl which introduced the idea of function into architecture. Modernist architecture can be seen in many movements such as expressionist, constructivist and art deco. The American Modernist period saw the re-emergence of site-specific architecture where architects considered the forms of their structures and how they would blend into their surrounding environments. Contemporary interpretations of site-specific architecture are notably seen in the 1950s when Frank Lloyd Wright coined the term organic architecture, this interpretation of site-specific architecture revolves around design that coexists with the pre-existing elements of a site.

21st century 'contemporary architecture' structures are no longer limited to the boundaries of previous centuries. There are now innovative materials and tools which can assist architects in their designs making it easier to create buildings in unprecedented forms. Sustainability is at the forefront of contemporary architects thinking due to the climate change emergency, this move towards eco-conscious buildings has assisted in the re-emergence of site-specific designs.

== Theory ==
Site-specific architecture surrounds the practice of creating a structure which cohesively blends with the space that it was intended, through this style buildings do not only exists in the physical but also inspire spiritual connection. This theory concludes that when designing and creating a building, the use of the space and area in which it is intended must be at the forefront of the designers thinking. The components that are important in this way of thinking include the location, local materials, environment and weather of the region as well as the community values, experiences and aspirations of the client or intended users. This genre of architecture is aimed to integrate with its surrounding, surrounding the concept that all components of the design must support one another, and grow with the environment rather than against it. American architect, Frank Lloyd Wright is often dubbed 'the father of modernism', practiced architecture through the theory that "form follows nature". Lloyd Wright took this notion a step further insinuating that "form and function are one". Site specific architecture is primarily associated with the aim to promote sustainable design solutions, due to the failings of late modernist planning to respond to local characteristics site specific architecture has emerged as a crucial genre.

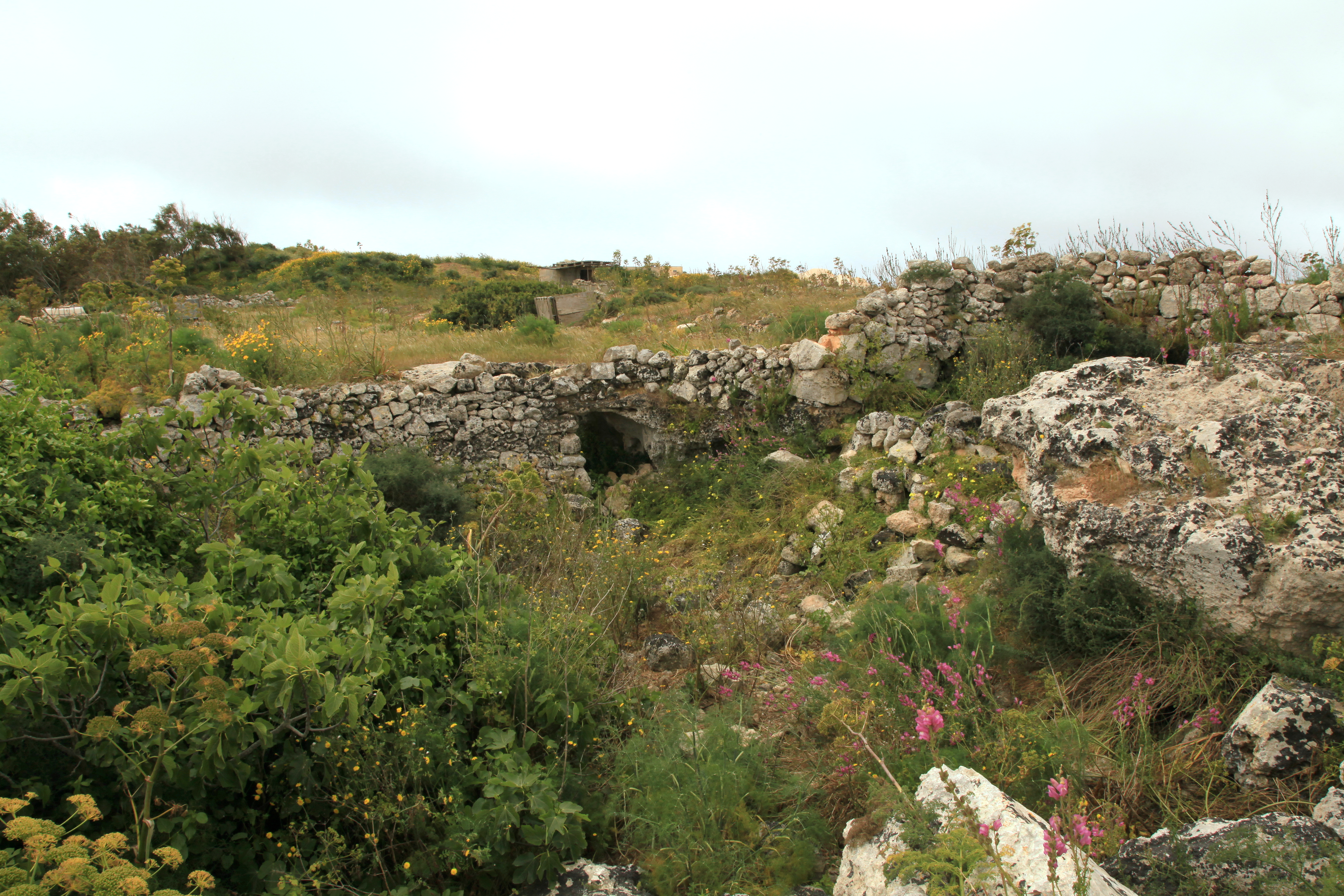
Malta - Siggiewi - Misrah Ghar il-Kbir - Cave dwellings 10 ies

Beyond cohesively blending buildings into their surroundings, site-specific architecture also involves the curation of space in relation to its purpose. This can entail religious and spiritual spaces. Historically examples of this can be seen in the original cave dwellings of areas in Malta, more recent examples can be seen in the development of spiritual sanctuaries and retreats.

== Site-specific architects ==
=== Frank Lloyd Wright ===
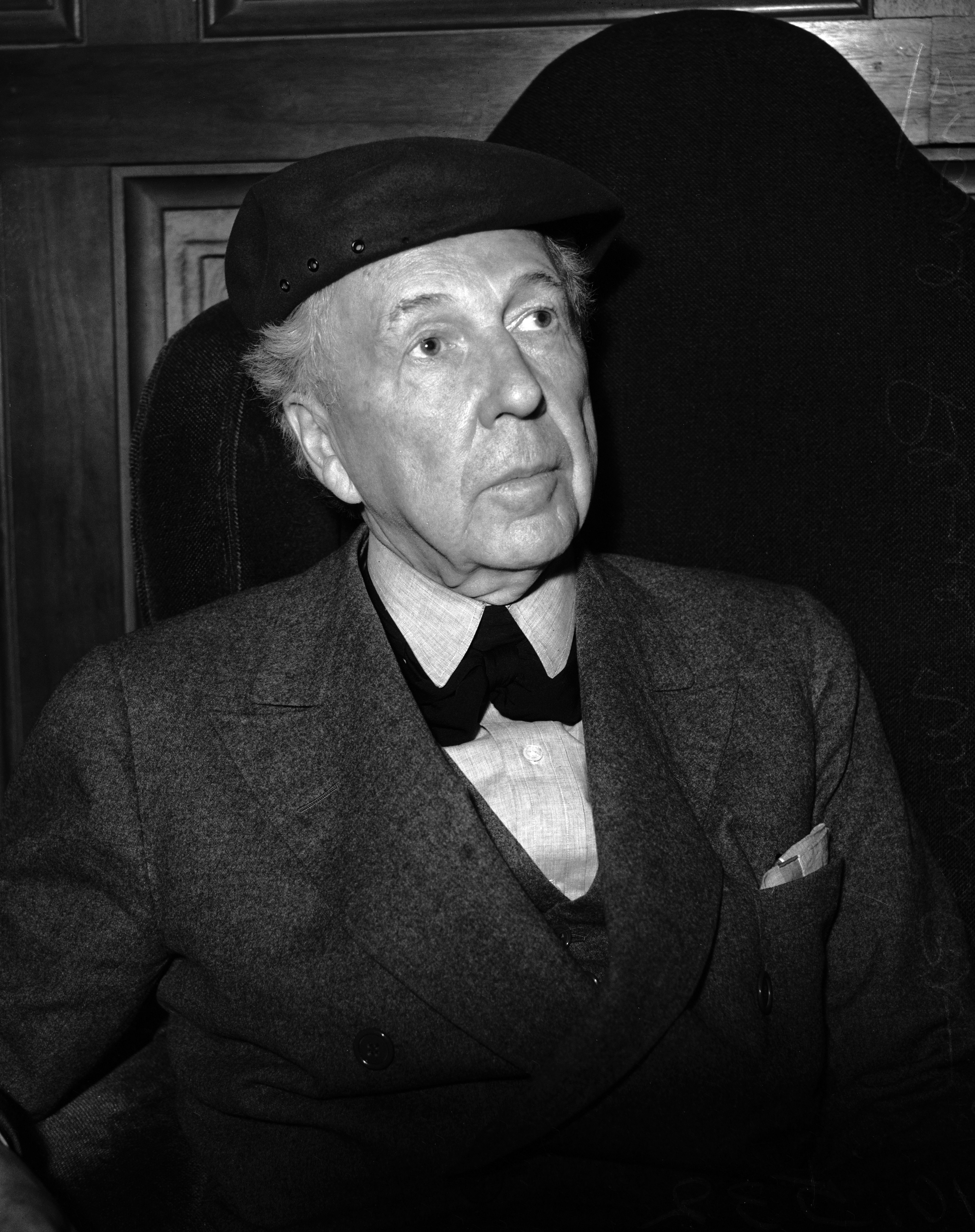
Frank Lloyd Wright portrait, Los Angeles Daily News

Frank Lloyd Wright (1867-1959) was an American architect famed for his revolutionary designs in the 20th century, 8 of his designs including, Fallingwater, the Guggenheim Museum and Unity Temple are listed as UNESCO World Heritage sites. Lloyd Wright was known largely for the coining of the term 'organic architecture' which saw the cohesion of environment and buildings using texture, earthy tones and a sensitive attention to materials in architectural design. Throughout his career Lloyd Wright published several articles and books expanding upon the philosophy of organic architecture and the importance in the relationship between a site, building and time, "No house should ever be on a hill or on anything. It should be of the hill. Belonging to it. Hill and house should live together, each the happier for the other" (Lloyd Wright, 1932, p 168). Lloyd Wrights approach towards architecture was not aesthetic nor stylistic but rather philosophical, he designed in alignment with the principles of site-specific architecture to create a space in which blends seamlessly with its surroundings.

=== NOA (network of architecture) ===
Network of Architecture is a collaborative architecture firm that was founded by Lukas Rungger and Stefan Rier, the firm works with the philosophy of designs that centres round the natural landscape of a space. Their goal is not to build houses to but design stories, the network approaches each project with specific research and an "intense learning in process" in order to understand the traditional culture of an area as well as looking towards the ways of modern life.

=== R. Buckminster Fuller ===
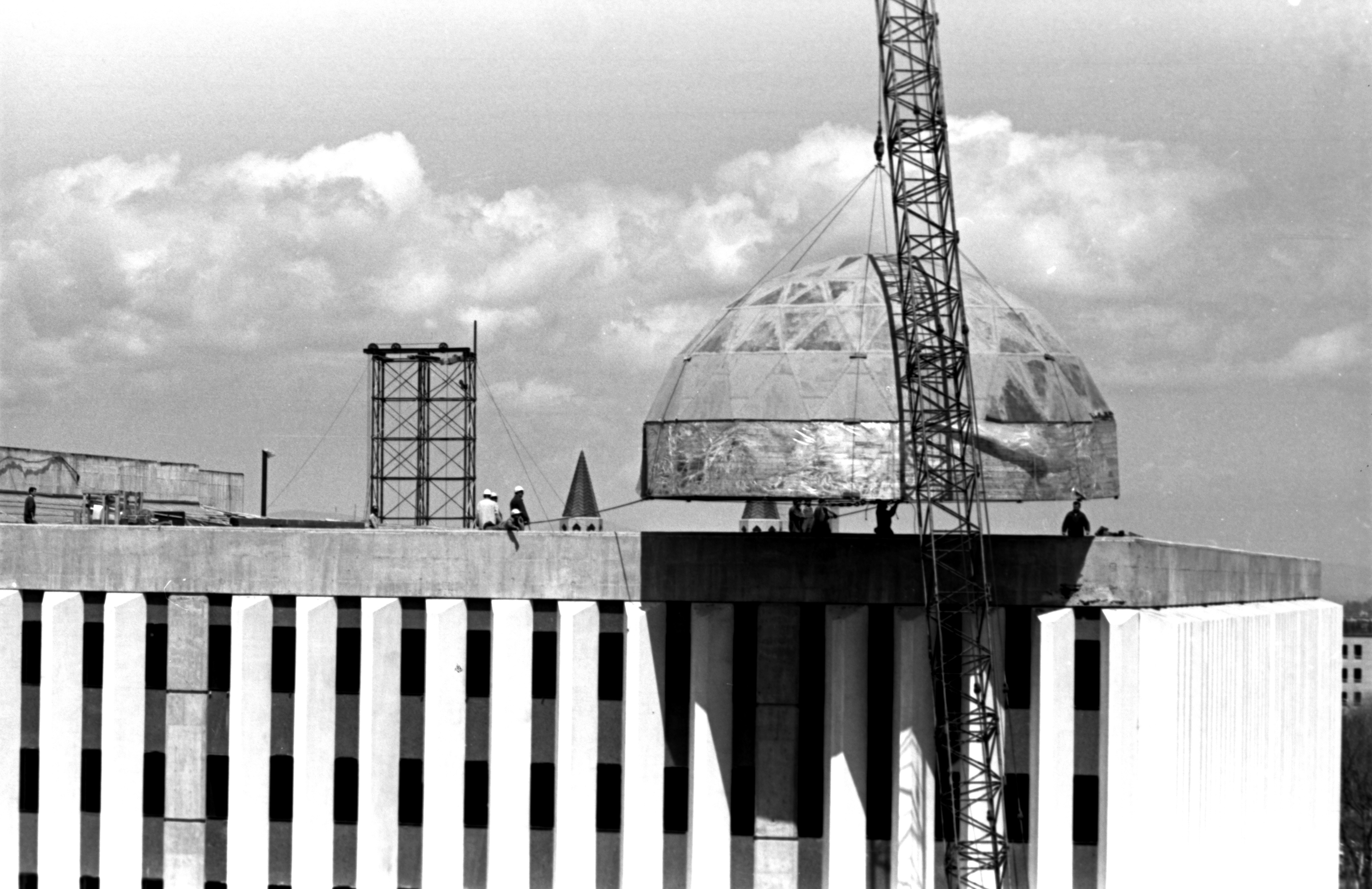
Dômes géodésiques 254-2-006

Richard Buckminster Fuller was an American architect who works across a variety of fields including architecture, design, geometry, science, engineering and cartography in order to create designs for 100% of humanity. Fuller who throughout his career perfected his design of the 'geodesic dome' believed in cultivating design solutions to create structures that moulded with the environment rather than against it. Fuller was able to understand the complex relationship between society, technology and the environment and thus through this understanding created architecture in which intended to exist with both humankind and eco-systems.

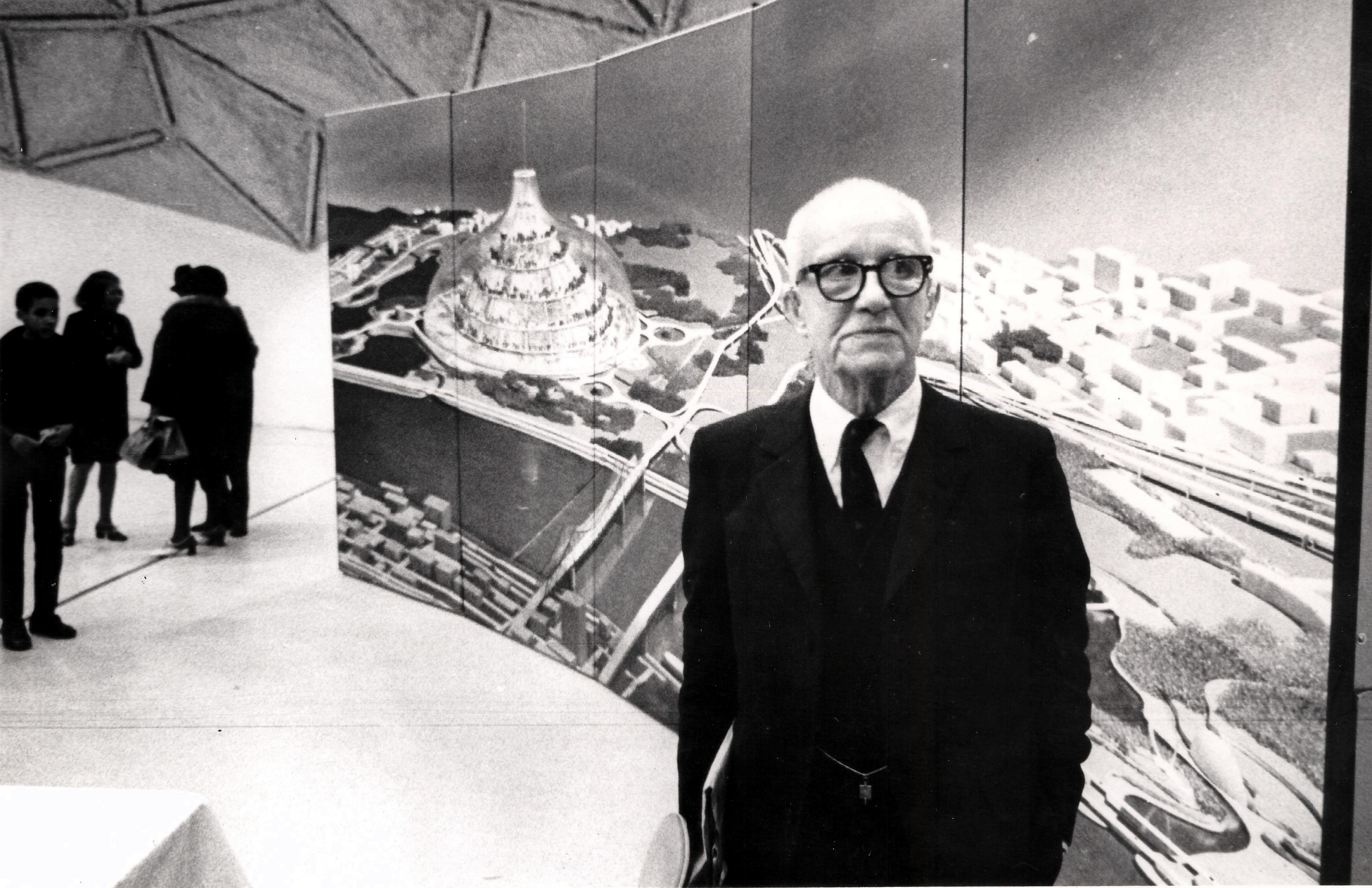
R. Buckminster Fuller with his domed city design

His approach to site-specific theories saw a specific study of the elements of nature and how structures interacted with them. He was able to promote responsible protection of the environment through his designs and theories.

== Notable examples ==
=== Hal Salfieni Hypogeum ===
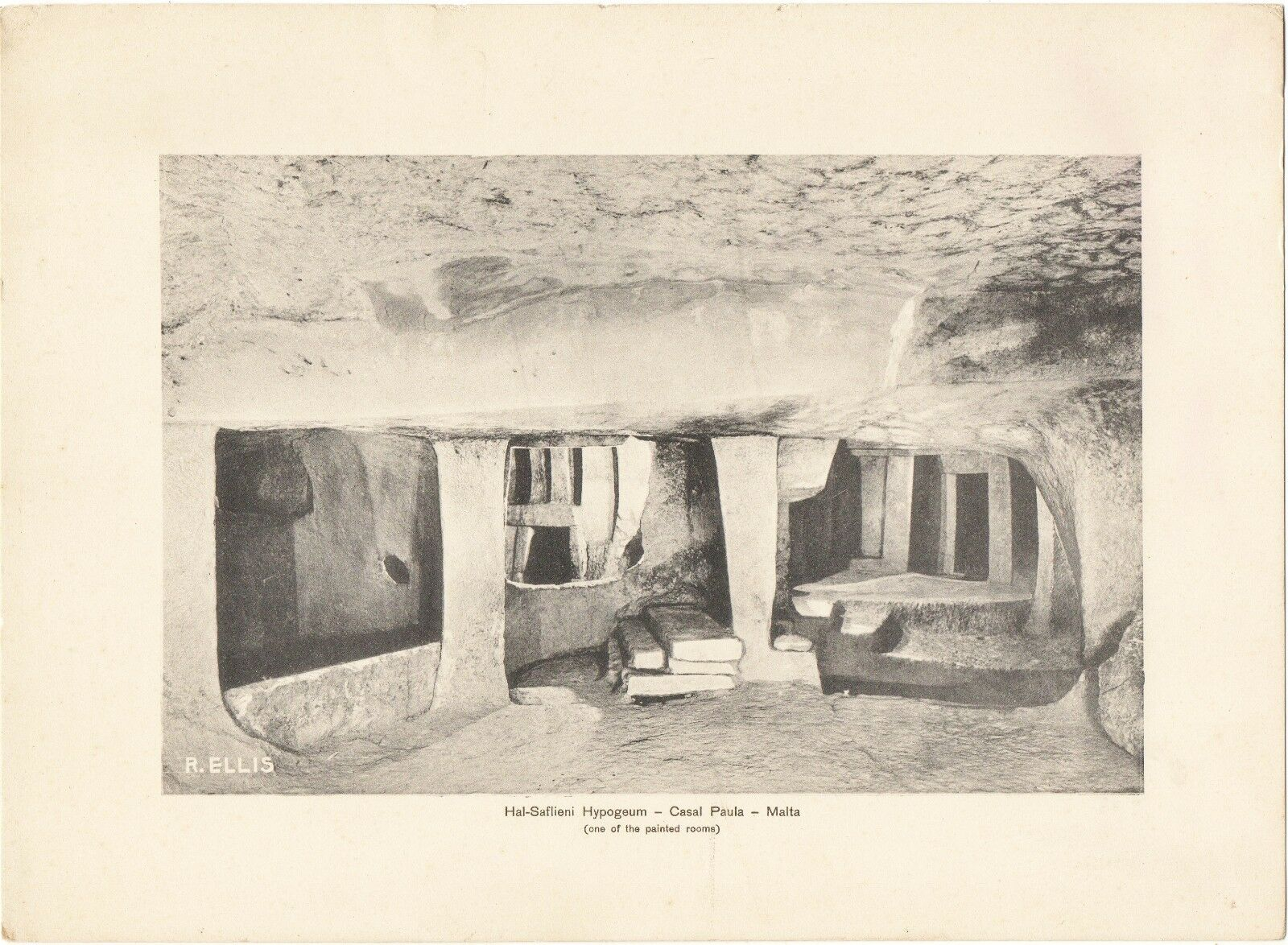
Richard Ellis, Hal Saflieni Hypogeum (one of the painted rooms)

Hal Salfieni Hypogeum is an underground burial site that was discovered in 1902, the remains of the site date back to 4000 BC. The underground cemetery is located on a hill overlooking the Grand Harbour of Valletta in Malta. Hal Salfileni Hypogeum is an early example of site-specific architecture whereby the builders of the site have considered both the pre-existing environmental structure of the area as well as the purpose of the space. The expanse of the space was carved entirely of solid limestone, the excavation the space was only able to be achieved by the rudimentary technology of the Stone Age people. It is estimated that there were more than 6000 bodies buried within the site, some historian's hypothesis that the ritual of burying saw bodies left to decompose until the flesh fell off the bones. The bones were then collected and stacked within the hypogeum.

=== Fallingwater ===
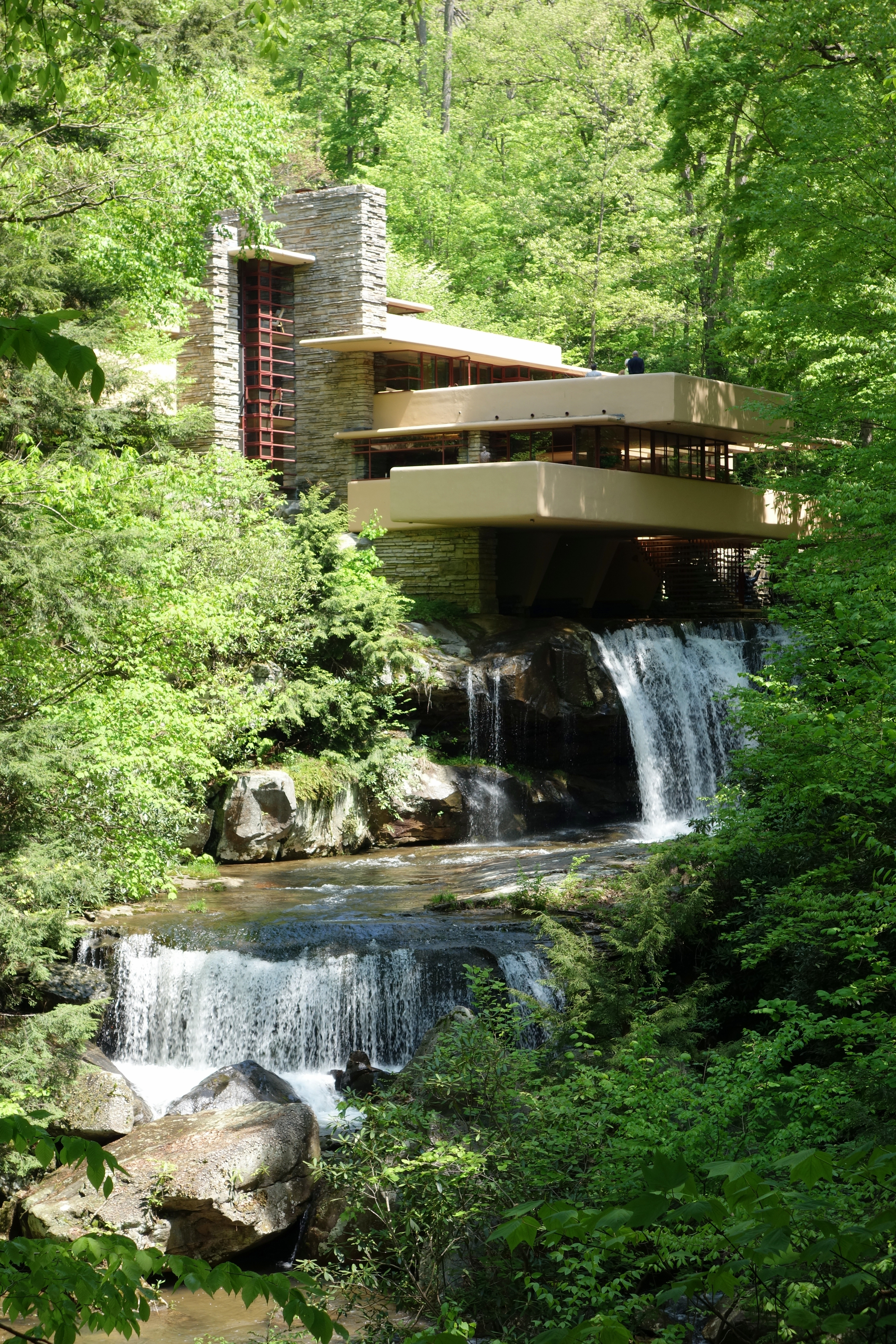
Fallingwater - DSC05639

Frank Lloyd Wright designed Fallingwater in 1935 for Edgar J. Kaufmann and his wife Liliane, the site has been referred to as one of the best examples of American architecture. The house was commissioned as a summer house for the couple to escape from their lives in Pittsburgh. Lloyd Wright designed the home to complement the site, wanting to integrate the pre-existing waterfall into the home so that the Kaufmann's lived 'with' the waterfall as an 'integral' part of their lives. Originally the Kaufmann's had been disappointed with the plans of Lloyd Wright as they had wanted to have a view of the waterfall from their home. However, Lloyd Wright ignored the desires of his client and followed his own vision. Fallingwater is described as a place that "effectively unites architecture and nature as one" (Laseau and Tice, 1992, 94). The concrete and limestone exterior seamlessly blends into the environment surrounding, this naturalistic aesthetic extends inside through house using stone floors.

=== Aloni ===
Designed by architectural team DECA, Aloni is a house that was built entirely for its site. Located on the Greek island of Antiparos the house is moulded to the shape of the land. The design for Aloni responds specifically to the topography of the rural landscape as well as the historical artefacts that are found on the Island. There are endless terraces that have been built into the landscape of the Aegean islands in order to create flat surfaces that would allow for agricultural production. DECA responded to these stone walls by creating a house that blends with the earth. The underground home is built with natural materials to maintain a serenity among the landscape. Through studying the site DECA was able to minimise the boundaries associated with building on the delicate terrain of the Cycladic landscape, instead of creating homes DECA transforms the landscape so that it can be inhabited.

=== High desert house ===
Kendrick Bangs Kellogg designed High Desert House on the edge of Joshua Tree National Park for artists Jay and Bev Doolittle. The house is composed of 26 concrete columns that are sunk into the bedrock. The large natural boulders of the area are incorporated into the design creating a monolithic aesthetic within the space.
