= Architecture of Chicago =

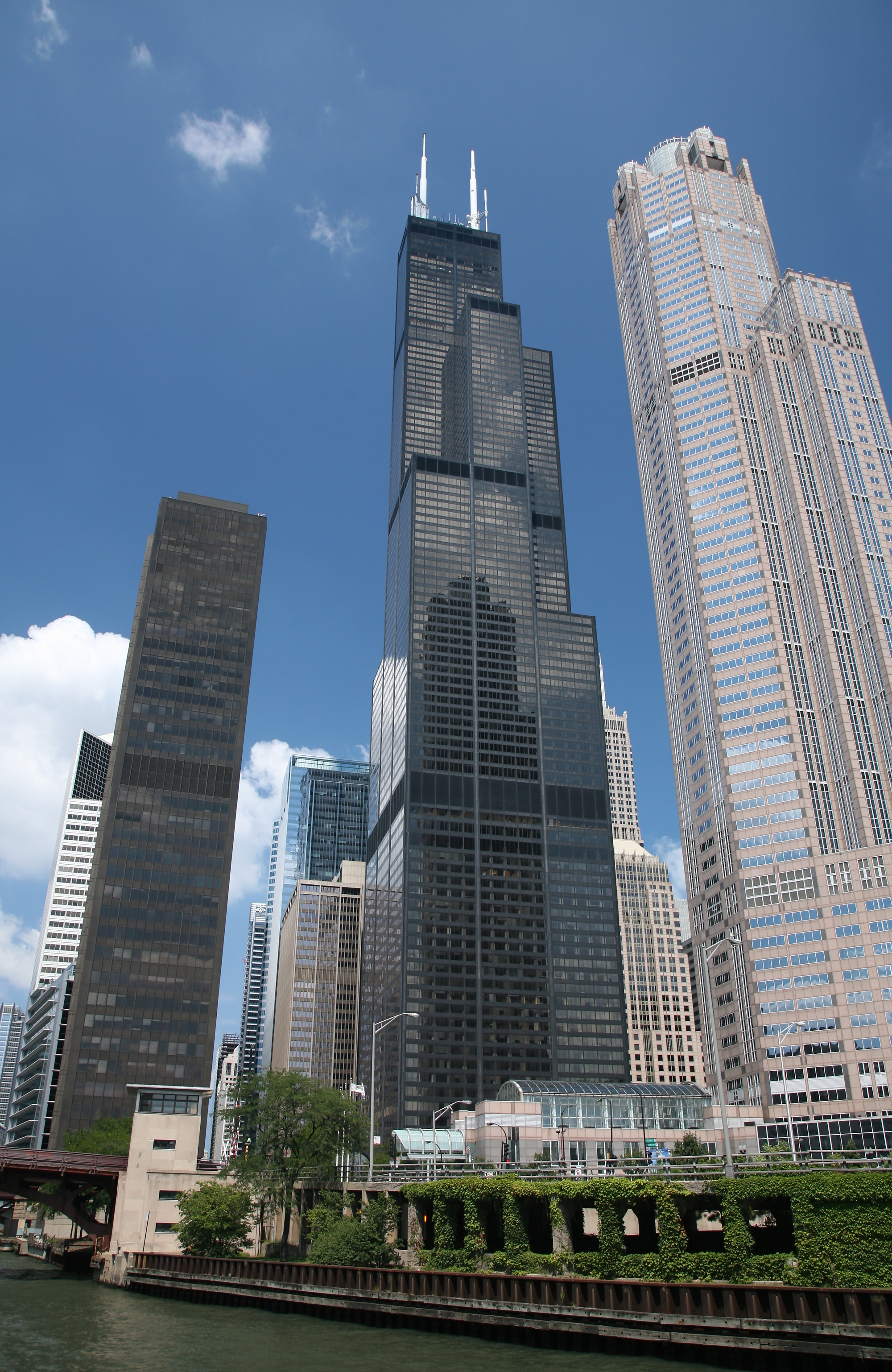
Willis Tower, the tallest building in Chicago. From 1974 to 1998, it was the world's tallest building.

The buildings and architecture of Chicago reflect the city's history and multicultural heritage, featuring prominent buildings in a variety of styles. Most structures downtown were destroyed by the Great Chicago Fire in 1871 (an exception being the Water Tower).

Chicago's architectural styles include the Chicago School primarily in skyscraper design, Chicago Bungalows, Two-Flats, and Greystones. The Loop is home to skyscrapers as well as sacred architecture including "Polish Cathedrals". Chicago is home to one of the largest and most diverse collections of skyscrapers in the world.

== Skyscrapers ==
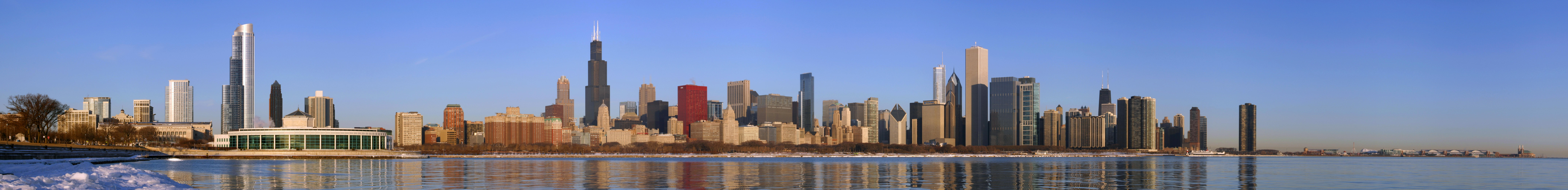
The 2010 Chicago skyline as seen from the Adler Planetarium (use cursor to identify buildings)

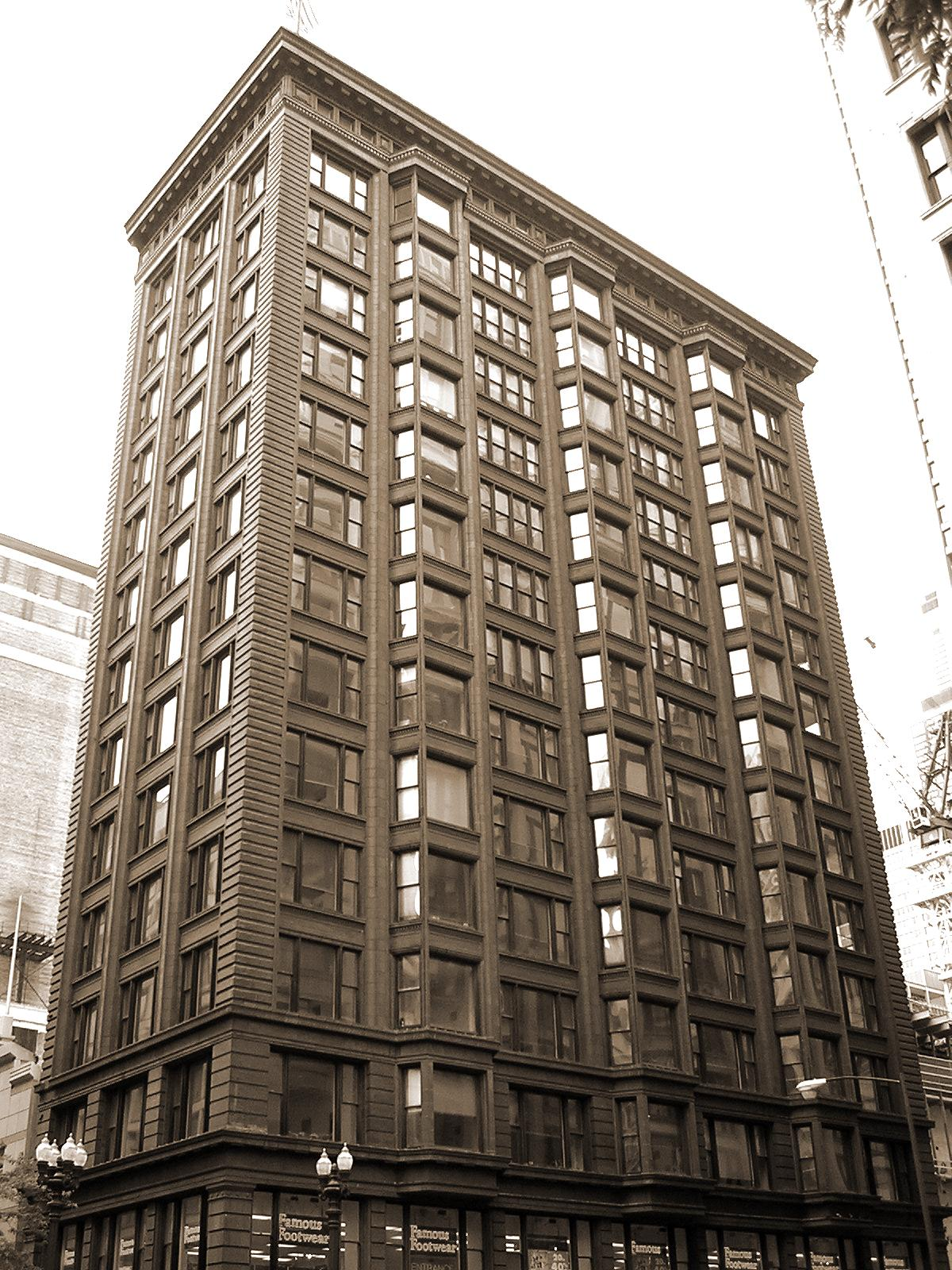
The Chicago Building is an example of Chicago School architecture.

Beginning in the early 1880s, architectural pioneers of the Chicago School explored steel-frame construction and, in the 1890s, the use of large areas of plate glass. These were among the first modern skyscrapers. William LeBaron Jenney's Home Insurance Building was completed in 1885 and is considered to be the first to use steel in its structural frame instead of cast iron. However, this building was still clad in heavy brick and stone. The Montauk Building, designed by John Wellborn Root Sr. and Daniel Burnham, was built from 1882 to 1883 using structural steel. Daniel Burnham and his partners, John Welborn Root and Charles B. Atwood, designed technically advanced steel frames with glass and terra cotta skins in the mid-1890s, in particular the Reliance Building; these were made possible by professional engineers, in particular E. C. Shankland, and modern contractors, in particular George A. Fuller.

Louis Sullivan discarded historical precedent and designed buildings that emphasized their vertical nature. This new form of architecture, by Jenney, Burnham, Sullivan, and others, became known as the "Commercial Style," but was called the "Chicago School" by later historians.

In 1892, the Masonic Temple surpassed the New York World Building, breaking its two-year reign as the tallest skyscraper, only to be surpassed itself two years later by another New York building.

Since 1963, a "Second Chicago School" has emerged from the work of Ludwig Mies van der Rohe at the Illinois Institute of Technology in Chicago. The ideas of structural engineer Fazlur Khan were also influential in this movement. He introduced composite construction to tall tubular buildings, which in turn paved the way for the creation of supertall composite buildings such as Petronas Towers and the Jin Mao Building since the 1960s.

== Landmarks, monuments and public places ==
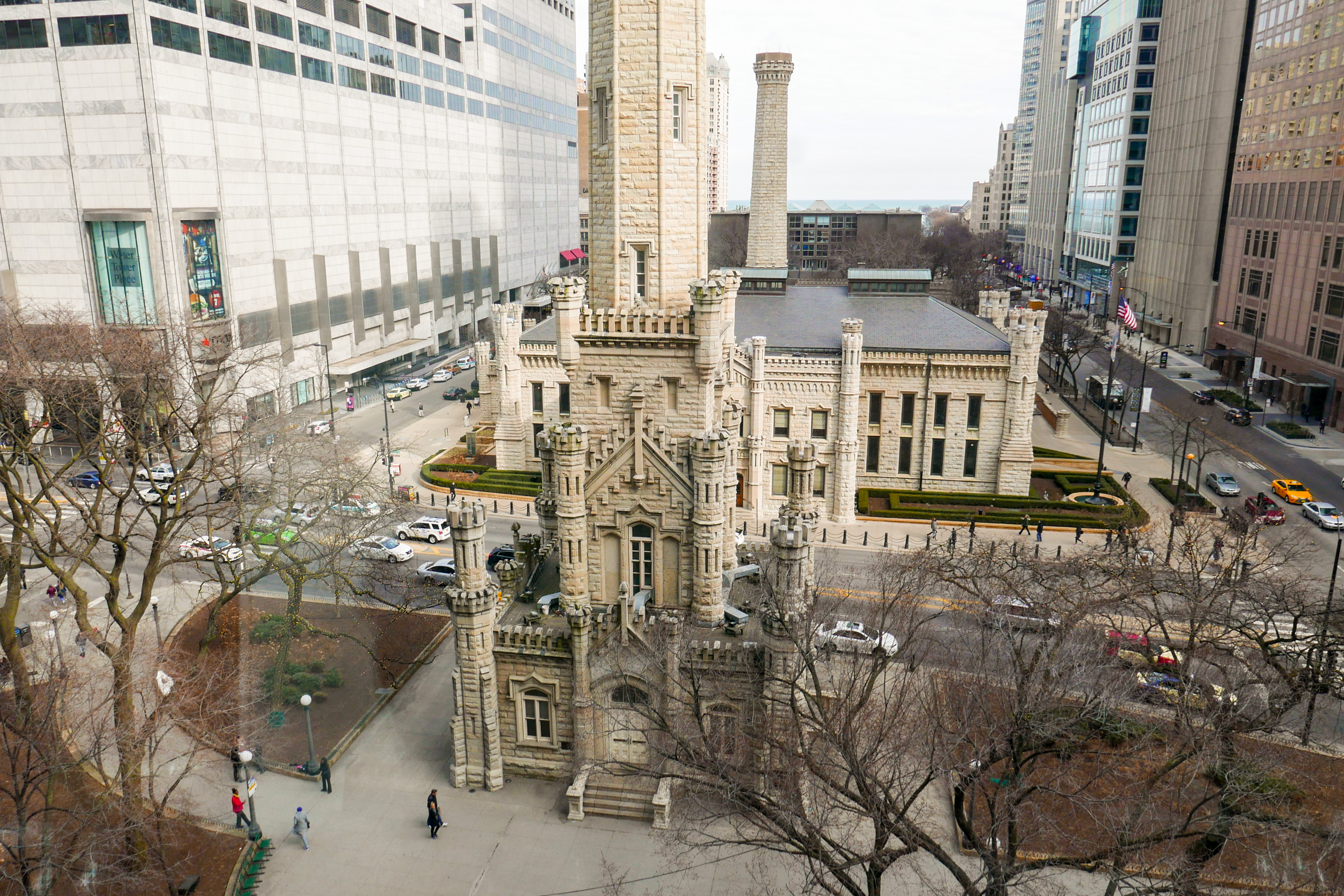
Chicago Avenue Pumping Station and Water Tower in the Old Chicago Water Tower District

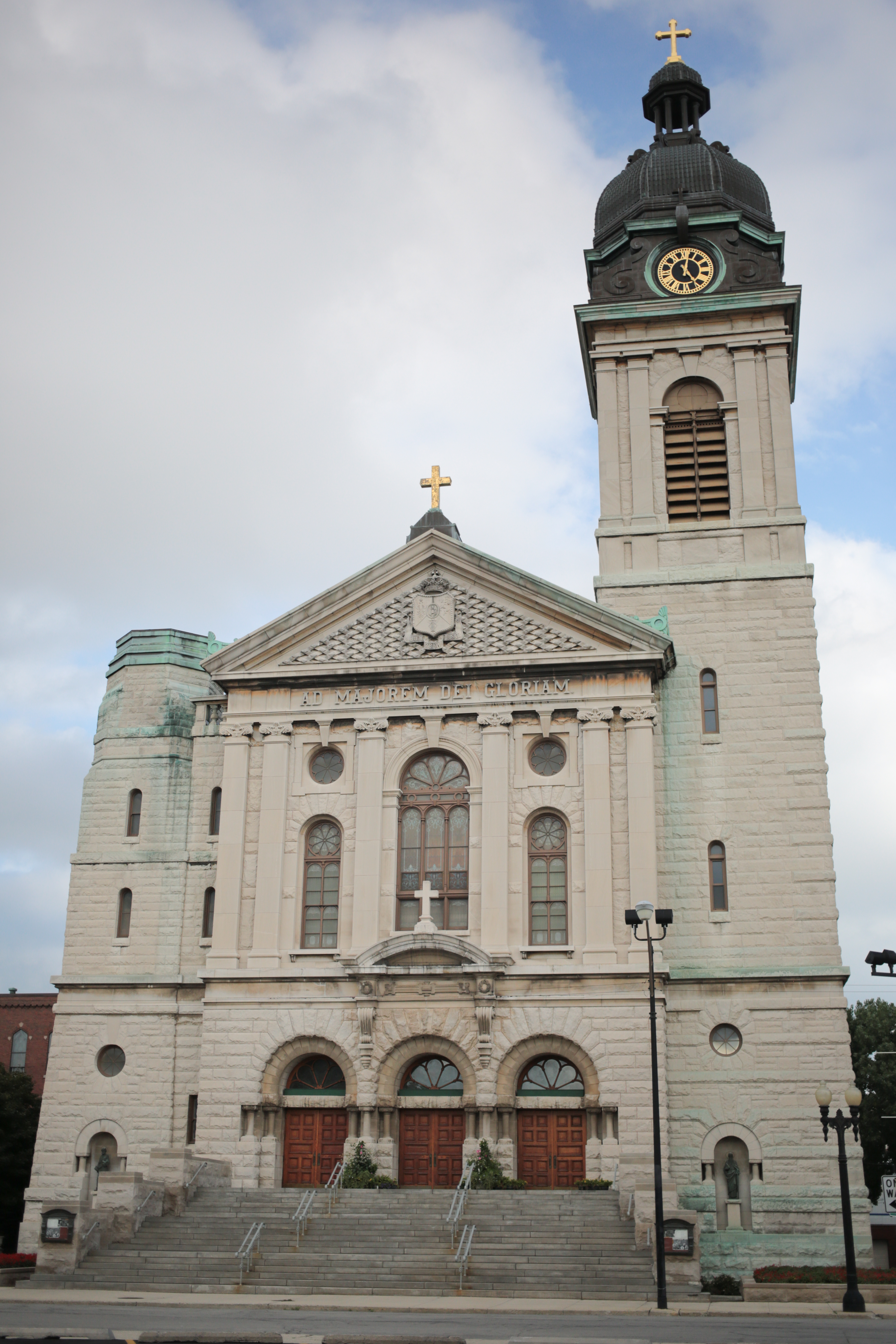
St. John Cantius, one of Chicago's 'Polish Cathedrals'

Numerous architects have constructed landmark buildings of varying styles in Chicago. Among them are the so-called "Chicago seven": James Ingo Freed, Tom Beeby, Larry Booth, Stuart Cohen, James Nagle, Stanley Tigerman, and Ben Weese. Daniel Burnham led the design of the "White City" of the 1893 World's Columbian Exposition which some historians claim led to a revival of Neo-Classical architecture throughout Chicago and the entire United States. Burnham developed the 1909 "Plan for Chicago" in a Neo-Classical style, although many skyscrapers were built after the Exposition closed, between 1894 and 1899. Louis Sullivan said that the fair set the course of American architecture back by two decades, but his work the Schlesinger and Meyer (later Carson, Pirie, Scott) store was built in 1899—five years after the "White City" and ten years before Burnham's Plan.

Erik Larson's history of the Columbian Exposition, The Devil in the White City, says that the building techniques developed during the construction of the many buildings of the fair were entirely modern, even if they were adorned in a way Sullivan found aesthetically distasteful.

Chicago's public art includes outdoor works by Chagall, Picasso, Miró and Abakanowicz.

City sculptures additionally honor people and topics from the history of Chicago. There are monuments to:

- Tadeusz Kościuszko by Kazimierz Chodzinski
- Nicholas Copernicus by Bertel Thorvaldsen
- Karel Havlíček Borovský by Joseph Strachovsky
- Pope John Paul II, several different monuments (including by Czesław Dźwigaj)
- Tomáš Garrigue Masaryk by Albin Polasek
- Irv Kupcinet by Preston Eugene Jackson
- Abraham Lincoln by Augustus Saint Gaudens
- The Heald Square Monument featuring George Washington, Haym Salomon, and Robert Morris by Lorado Taft, (completed by Leonard Crunelle)
- Christopher Columbus by Carl Brioschi
- General John A. Logan by Augustus Saint Gaudens
- Harry Caray by Omri Amrany and Lou Cella
- Jack Brickhouse by Jerry McKenna
- A memorial to the Haymarket affair by Mary Brogger
- A memorial to the Great Northern Migration by Alison Saar

In the 21st century, Chicago has become an urban focus for landscape architecture and the architecture of public places. 19th-20th century Chicago architects included Burnham, Frederick Olmsted, Jens Jensen and Alfred Caldwell, modern projects include Millennium Park, Northerly Island, the 606, the Chicago Riverwalk, Maggie Daley Park, and proposals in Jackson Park.

== Residential architecture ==
In the late 1800s, a wave of European immigrants arrived to Chicago from Germany, Poland, and the Czech Republic. Many of them lived in "worker's cottages," narrow, one-story wooden buildings. As industry in the city grew, demand for housing grew, and more and more buildings with two or four units were built, known colloquially as "two-flats." A two-flat includes two apartments, each of which occupies a full floor, usually with a large bay window and with a grey stone or red brick facade. The apartments typically have a layout with a large living and dining room area at the front, the kitchen at the back and the bedrooms running down one side of the unit. Many such buildings were built by architects originating from Bohemia in the 19th and early 20th century.

In the early half of the 20th century, popular residential neighborhoods were developed with Chicago Bungalow style houses, many of which still exist. Buildings with two to four units make up 23.2% of Chicago's housing stock as of 2024. Partly due to a large number of conversions to single-family homes, the stock of such buildings decreased significantly in the 2010s, with over 4,800 two-flats leaving the market between 2012 and 2019.

Ludwig Mies van der Rohe's Illinois Institute of Technology campus in Chicago influenced the later Modern or International style. Van der Rohe's work is sometimes called the Second Chicago School. Frank Lloyd Wright's Prairie School influenced both building design and the design of furnishings.

== Preservation ==
Many organizations, including Preservation Chicago and Landmarks Illinois, promote the preservation of historic neighborhoods and buildings in Chicago. Chicago has suffered from the same problems with sinking property values and urban decline as other major cities. Many historic structures have been threatened with demolition.

== Timeline of notable buildings ==
1836–1900

- 1836 Henry B. Clarke House
- 1869 Chicago Water Tower, William W. Boyington
- 1874 Second Presbyterian Church 1936 S. Michigan, James Renwick 1900 Howard Van Doren Shaw
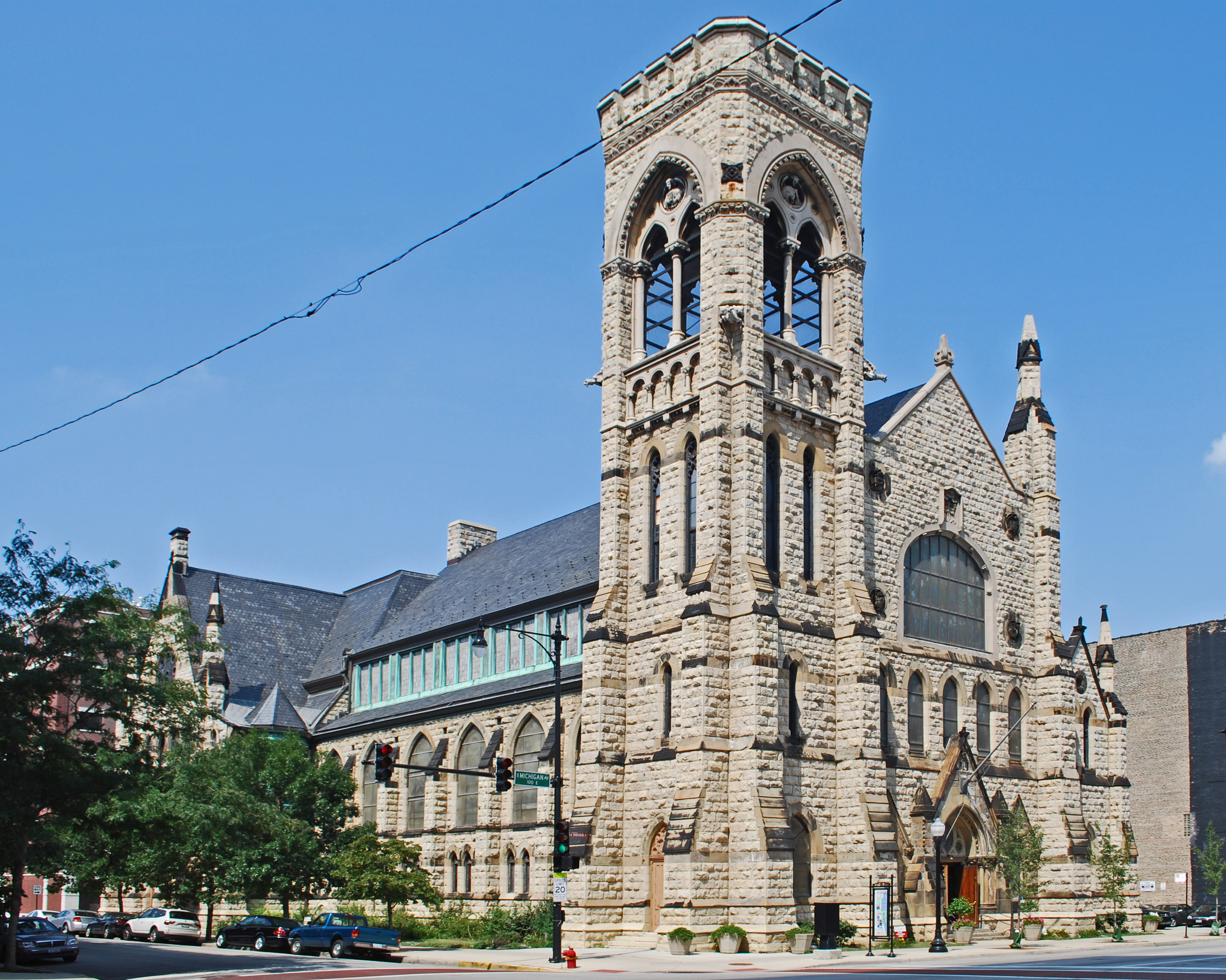
  Second Presbyterian Church (1874)
- 1877 St. Stanislaus Kostka Church 1327 N. Noble, Patrick Keely
- 1882–1883 Montauk Building, Daniel Burnham and John Wellborn Root. First building to be called a "skyscraper." (Demolished, 1902)
- 1885 Home Insurance Building, Chicago School, William Le Baron Jenney (Demolished, 1931)
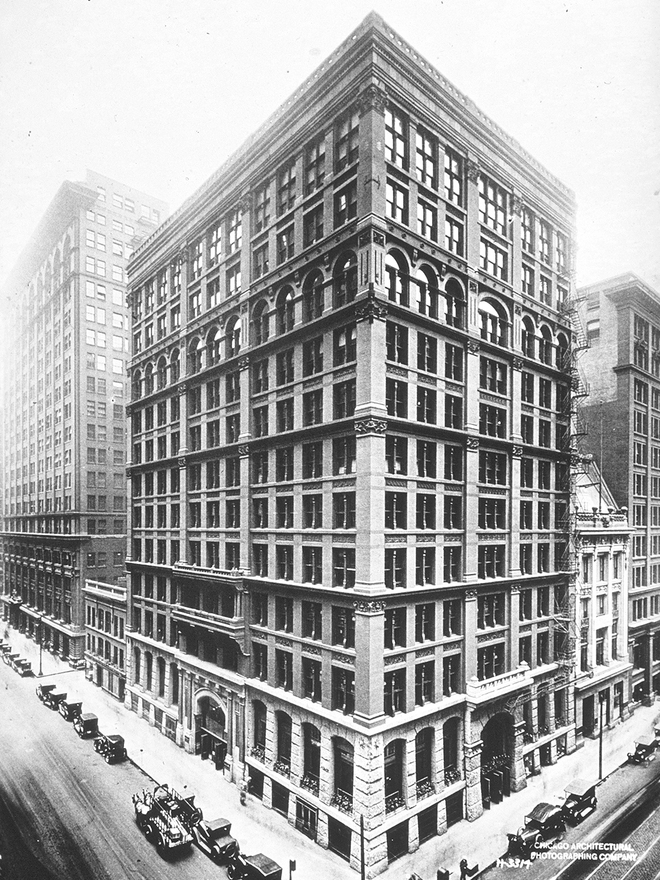
  Home Insurance Building (1885)
- 1885 Palmer Mansion, early Romanesque and Norman Gothic, Henry Ives Cobb and Charles Sumner Frost (Demolished, 1950)
- 1886 John J. Glessner House, Henry Hobson Richardson
- 1887 Marshall Field Warehouse, Henry Hobson Richardson (Demolished, 1930)
- 1888 Rookery Building, Daniel Burnham and John Wellborn Root, 1905 lobby redesign by Frank Lloyd Wright
- 1889 Monadnock Building, Daniel Burnham and John Wellborn Root
- 1889 Auditorium Building, Louis Sullivan and Dankmar Adler.
- 1889 St. Mary of Perpetual Help Church, Henry Engelbert
- 1890 and 1894–1895 Reliance Building, Charles B. Atwood of Burnham & Root
- 1890–1899 Gage Group Buildings, Holabird & Roche with Louis Sullivan
- 1891 Manhattan Building, William Le Baron Jenney
- 1892 Masonic Temple, Daniel Burnham and John Wellborn Root (Demolished, 1939)
- 1892–1893 World's Columbian Exposition, Daniel Burnham, director of Works
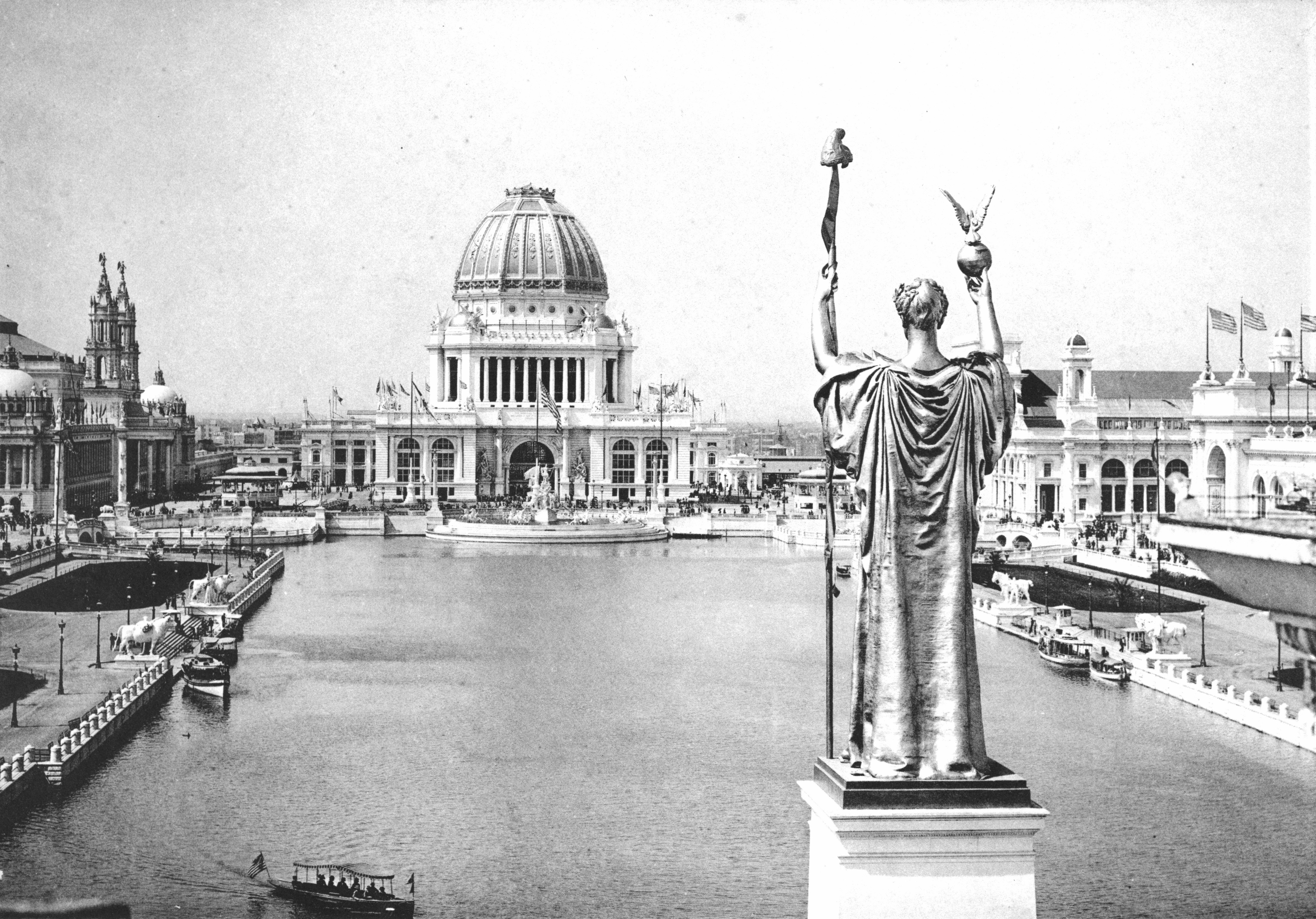
  World's Columbian Exposition (1892–93)
- 1893 Palace of Fine Arts, later Museum of Science and Industry, Beaux-Arts, Charles B. Atwood
- 1893-1898 St. John Cantius Church, Alphonsus Druiding
- 1894 Tree Studio Building and Annexes, Judge Lambert & Anne Tree via Parfitt Brothers; 1912 annex: Hill and Woltersdorf
- 1895–1896 Fisher Building (Chicago), D.H. Burnham & Company, Charles B. Atwood
- 1897 St. Paul Church 2234 S. Hoyne, Henry Schlacks
- 1897 Chicago Library (now Chicago Cultural Center), Shepley, Rutan and Coolidge
- 1899 Sullivan Center, Louis Sullivan; 1905–1906, twelve-story south addition, D.H. Burnham & Company

1900–1939:

- 1902 Marshall Field and Company Building, north State Street building D.H. Burnham & Company, Charles B. Atwood
- 1903 Holy Trinity Cathedral, Chicago
- 1905-1906 Holy Trinity Polish Mission, Herman Olszewski and William G. Krieg,
- 1905 Chicago Federal Building, Henry Ives Cobb
- 1906 Sears Merchandise Building Tower, George G. Nimmons - William K. Fellows
- 1907 Marshall Field and Company Building, south State Street building D.H. Burnham & Company, Charles B. Atwood
- 1909 Robie House, Prairie School, Frank Lloyd Wright
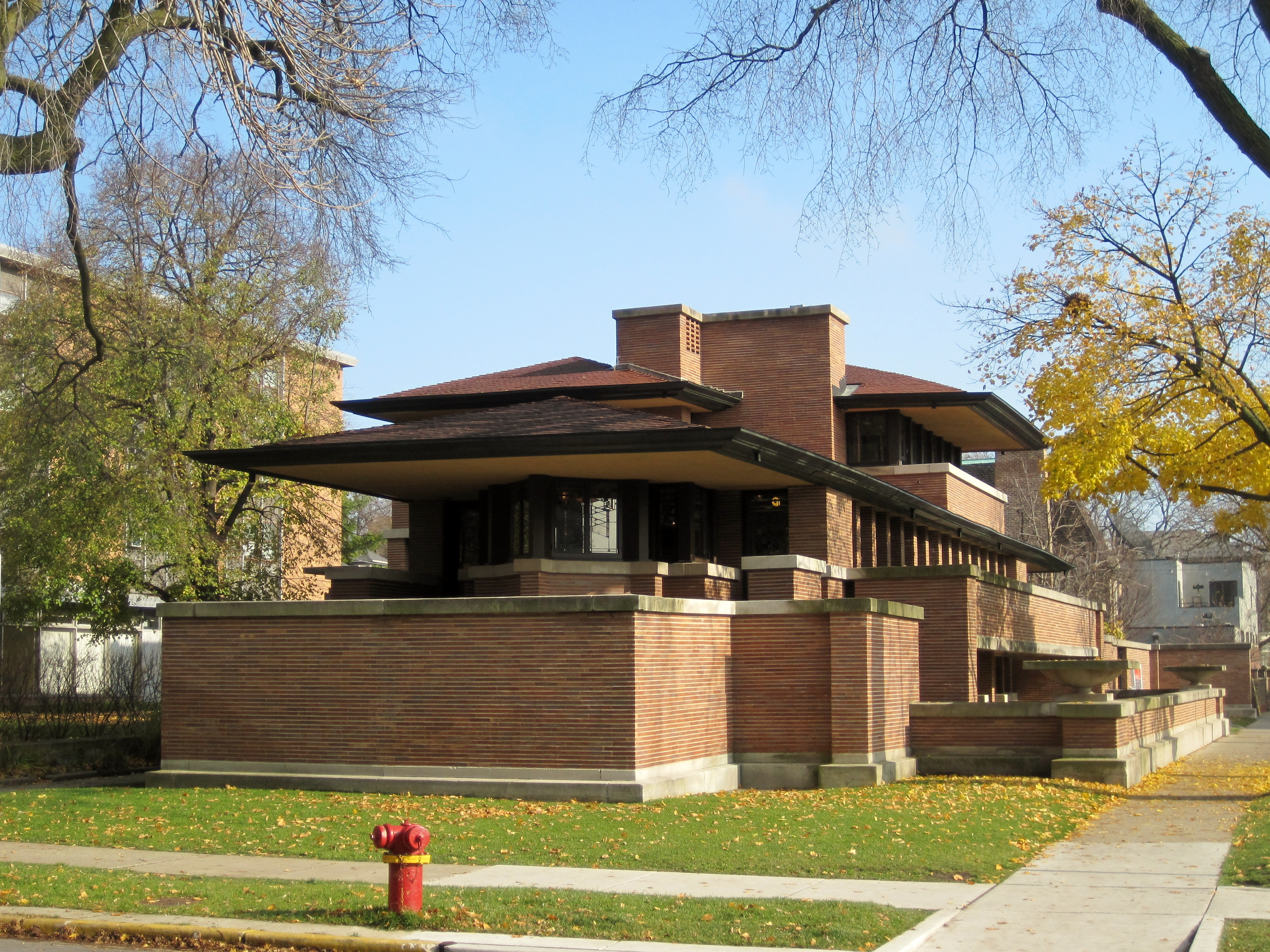
  Robie House (1909)
- 1910–1911 Eighth Church of Christ, Scientist, Leon E. Stanhope. Designated a Chicago Landmark on June 9, 1993.
- 1912–1914 St. Adalbert's Church 1650 W.17th street, Henry Schlacks
- 1912 Medinah Temple North Wabash Avenue
- 1912 Pulaski Park fieldhouse by Jens Jensen
- 1914 Navy Pier
- 1914-1920 St. Mary of the Angels Church 1850 N. Hermitage Ave, Worthmann and Steinbach
- 1915 Holy Cross Church, Joseph Molitor
- 1916 Navy Pier Auditorium, Charles Sumner Frost
- 1917–1920 Michigan Avenue Bridge, Edward H. Bennett
- 1917-1921 Basilica of St. Hyacinth 3636 West Wolfram Avenue, Worthmann & Steinbach
- 1919-1924 Wrigley Building, Graham, Anderson, Probst & White
- 1921 Chicago Theatre, Beaux-Arts, Cornelius W. Rapp and George L. Rapp
- 1921 Old Chicago Main Post Office, Graham, Anderson, Probst & White
- 1922 Tribune Tower, neo-Gothic, John Mead Howells and Raymond M. Hood
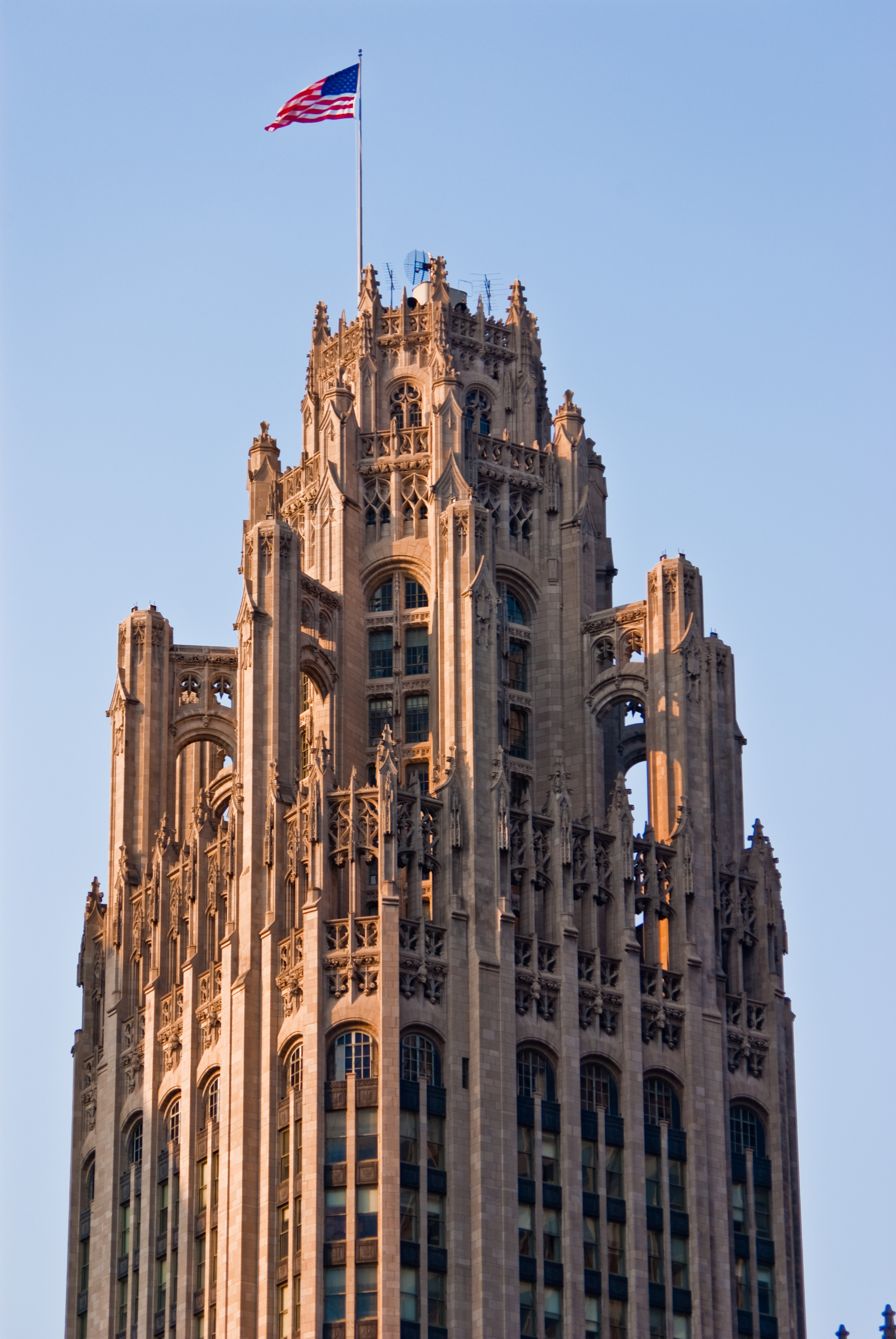
  Tribune Tower (1922)
- 1924 Soldier Field, Holabird & Roche; extensive renovation 2003, Ben Wood and Carlos Zapata
- 1925 Uptown Theatre, Cornelius W. Rapp and George L. Rapp
- 1927 Pittsfield Building, Graham, Anderson, Probst and White
- 1929 Carbide & Carbon Building, Daniel and Hubert Burnham, sons of Daniel Burnham
- 1929 Palmolive Building, Art Deco, Holabird & Root
- 1929 John G. Shedd Aquarium, Graham, Anderson, Probst & White
- 1930 Chicago Board of Trade Building, Holabird & Root
- 1930 All Saints Cathedral, J. G. Steinbach
- 1930 Gateway Theatre Mason Rapp of Rapp & Rapp; extensive renovation 1979 to 1984, "Solidarity Tower" addition in 1985
- 1930 Adler Planetarium & Astronomy Museum, Ernest A. Grunsfeld Jr.
- 1931 Merchandise Mart, Graham, Anderson, Probst & White
- 1930s-1960s Illinois Institute of Technology, including S.R. Crown Hall, Second Chicago School, Ludwig Mies van der Rohe and Skidmore, Owings & Merrill
- 1934 Field Building, Graham, Anderson, Probst & White

1940 to the present:

- 1940–1942 St. Wenceslaus church, 3400 N. Monticello Ave, McCarthy, Smith and Eppig
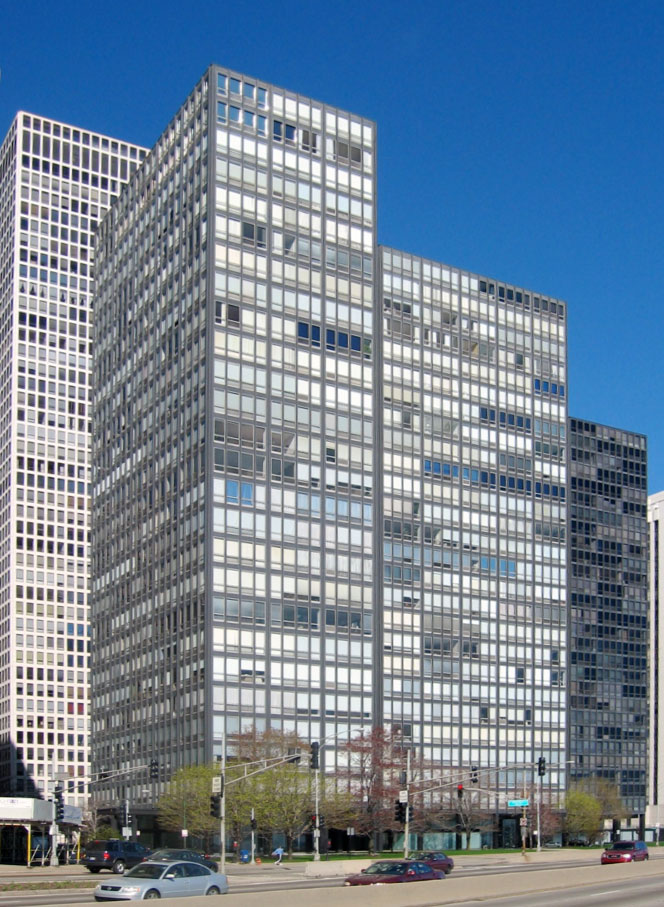
- 860-880 Lake Shore Drive
  1952 860–880 Lake Shore Drive, Ludwig Mies van der Rohe
- 1957 Inland Steel Building, Bruce Graham and Walter Netsch, Skidmore, Owings & Merrill,
- 1964 Marina City, Bertrand Goldberg
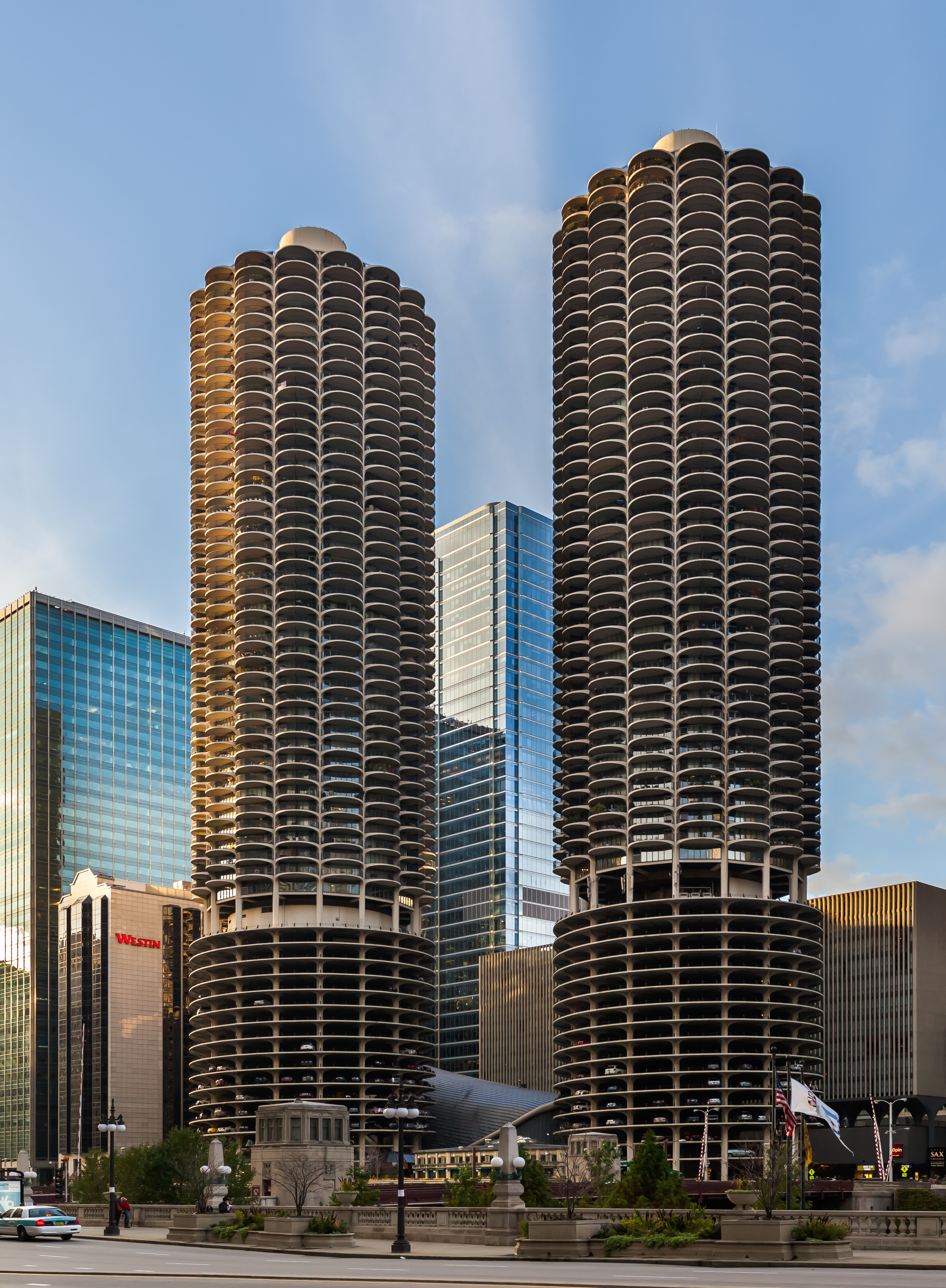
  Marina City (1964)
- 1968 Lake Point Tower, John Heinrich and George Schipporeit
- 1968 Seventeenth Church of Christ, Scientist. Harry Weese
- 1969 John Hancock Center, Bruce Graham, Skidmore, Owings & Merrill
- 1973 330 North Wabash, Ludwig Mies van der Rohe
- 1974 Willis Tower, Bruce Graham, Skidmore, Owings & Merrill (previously the Sears Tower)
- 1974 Aon Center, Edward Durrell Stone (earlier names were Standard Oil Building and Amoco Building)
- 1977 St. Joseph the Betrothed Ukrainian Greek Catholic Church
- 1979-85 James R. Thompson Center, Helmut Jahn
- 1989 NBC Tower, Skidmore, Owings & Merrill
- 1990 American Medical Association Building, Kenzo Tange
- 1990 Athletic Club Illinois Center, Kisho Kurokawa
- 1991 Harold Washington Library Center, Thomas Beeby
- 1991 Rate Field, Home of the White Sox
- 1991 Museum of Contemporary Art, Josef Paul Kleihues
- 1992 77 West Wacker Drive, Ricardo Bofill
- 2004 Millennium Park, Frank Gehry, Kathryn Gustafson, Anish Kapoor, Jaume Plensa, and others, a showcase for 21st century modernism.
- 2009 155 North Wacker, Goettsch Partners
- 2009 Trump International Hotel and Tower, Skidmore, Owings & Merrill
- 2010 Aqua Tower, Studio Gang Architects
- 2019 NEMA, Rafael Viñoly Architects
- 2019 One Bennett Park, Robert A.M. Stern Architects
- 2020 110 North Wacker, Goettsch Partners
- 2021 St. Regis Chicago, Studio Gang Architects
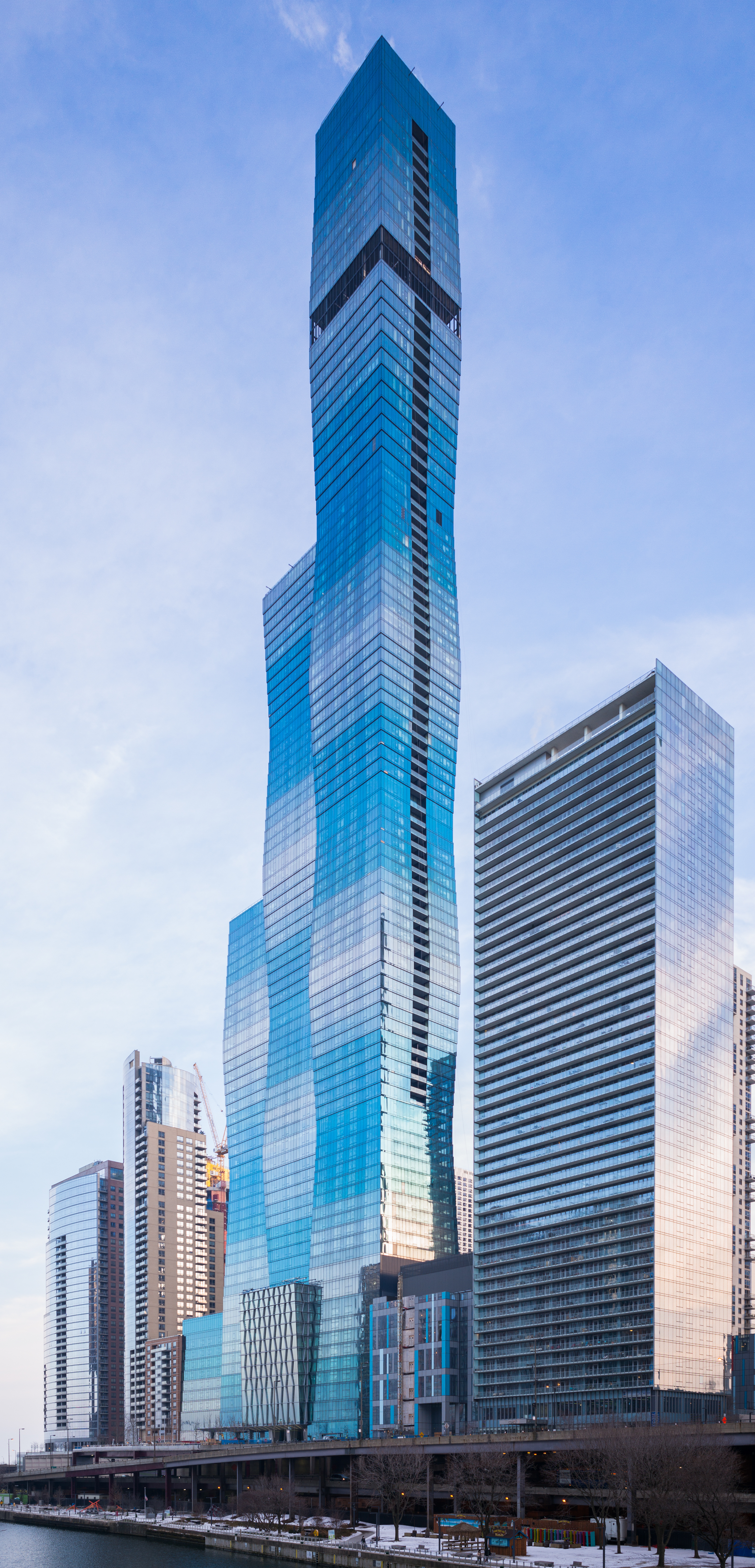
  St. Regis Chicago (2021)

== Styles and schools ==
Chicago architects used many design styles and belonged to a variety of architectural schools. Below is a list of those styles and schools.

- American Four-Square
- Art Deco/Moderne
- Art Nouveau
- Arts & Crafts
- Chateauesque
- Chicago School (Also called Commercial Style)
- City Beautiful
- Classical Revival (also known as Neoclassical architecture)
- Colonial Revival
- Craftsman (also known as American Craftsman)
- Dutch Colonial
- Eastlake/Stick
- Edwardian architecture
- Gothic Revival
- Greek Revival
- International (sometimes called Second Chicago School)
- Italianate
- Middle Eastern
- Modern
- Oriental
- Postmodern
- Prairie School
- Queen Anne
- Renaissance Revival also known as Neo-Renaissance
- Romanesque Revival also known as Neo-Romanesque
- Second Empire
- Spanish Revival also known as Spanish Colonial Revival
- Sullivanesque (for style elements and examples see Louis Sullivan)
- Tudor Revival
- Workers Cottage

== Buildings - a "Top Forty" List ==
In 2010, Chicago Magazine selected 40 existing properties for their historical and architectural importance, opening an on-line forum for debate. The top ten chosen were:

- 1: John Hancock Center, 875 N. Michigan Ave. (1969)
- 2: Rookery Building, 209 S. LaSalle St. (1885–1888)
- 3: 860-880 Lake Shore Drive Apartments, (1952)
- 4: Monadnock Building, 53 W. Jackson Blvd. (1891 and 1893)
- 5: Carson, Pirie, Scott and Company Building, 1 S. State St. (1899)
- 6: S. R. Crown Hall, 3360 S. State St. (1956)
- 7: Auditorium Building, 430 S. Michigan Ave. (1889)
- 8: Frederick C. Robie House, 5757 S. Woodlawn Ave. (1909)
- 9: Farnsworth House (Plano, Illinois), 14520 River Rd., Plano, IL (1951)
- 10: Sears Tower (now the Willis Tower), 233 S. Wacker Dr. (1974)

== See also ==
- Chicago Architecture Foundation
- Chicago Architecture Biennial
- Chicago Loop
- Chicago neighborhoods
- Landmarks of Chicago
- List of tallest buildings in Chicago
- Parks of Chicago
- Polish Cathedral style
- Visual arts of Chicago
