= Nagle Hartray Architecture =

- Company type: Private
- Industry: Architecture
- Founded: 1966
- Headquarters: One Prudential Plaza; Chicago, Illinois, United States
- Services: Architecture, Urban Design and Master Planning including: Interior Design and Sustainable Design
- Website: www.snh-a.com

Nagle Hartray Architecture is a Chicago architecture firm, founded in 1966. The company's early reputation was grounded in single-family and multi-family housing. Recent and current projects reflect diversification of the former focus, emphasizing educational, spiritual, civic, and media communication programs. Nagle Hartray has received over 75 industry design awards to date. In 2017, the firm merged with Sheehan Partners to form Sheehan Nagle Hartray Architects.

== Design ==
Chicago Tribune critic Blair Kamin characterized the firm as "one of the medium-sized firms that makes Chicago's architecture scene so strong. Its lineage stretches back to the office of Harry Weese. So does its appreciation of quirkiness and sophisticated contextualism."

The AIA Chicago 2009 Firm Award Jury said of the firm's work: "The architecture is an excellent and deft blend of design that is both rich yet restrained, contemporary yet referential, and powerful yet understated."

== Selected buildings ==
- Fountaindale Public Library District :: Bolingbrook, IL

This new building is situated to create a presence for the library along Briarcliff Road while maximizing views of an existing park that surrounds the library on two sides. Extensive green roofs further reinforce a connection to the park. The Library is the recipient numerous design awards and has been featured in multiple publications.

- Western Illinois University Multicultural Center :: Macomb, IL
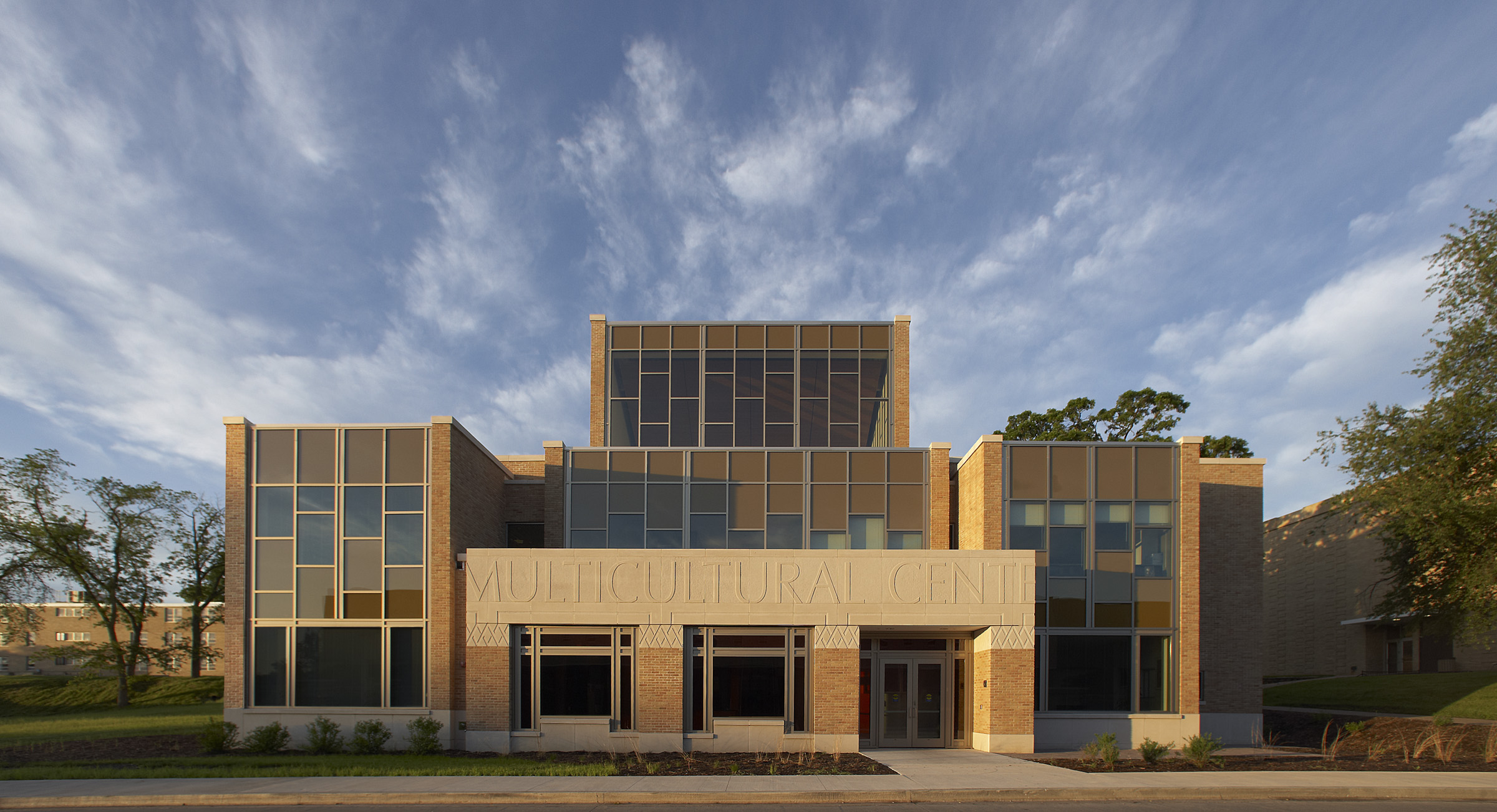
  Multicultural Center

The Multicultural Center brings together four minority student groups that were previously scattered around campus in separate facilities. The centrally-located building promotes an improved understanding of cultural differences through programs that disseminate the center’s mission to a broader campus audience. The internal layout encourages interaction through shared spaces and strategic user group adjacencies. The Center achieved LEED Silver Certification.

- Harpo Productions :: Chicago, IL

Nagle Hartray has provided design services for Oprah Winfrey's Harpo Productions since 1989, when the firm created a 100,000-square-foot (9,300 m^{2}) headquarters building by uniting five separate buildings from the 1920s. Ongoing renovations and additions since then have incorporated five additional buildings into the Harpo campus. Recent interior renovations to the Executive Suites and Production Departments in the headquarters building received an Honorable Mention from the American Society of Interior Designers Design Excellence Awards.

- St. Mary of the Springs :: Columbus, OH
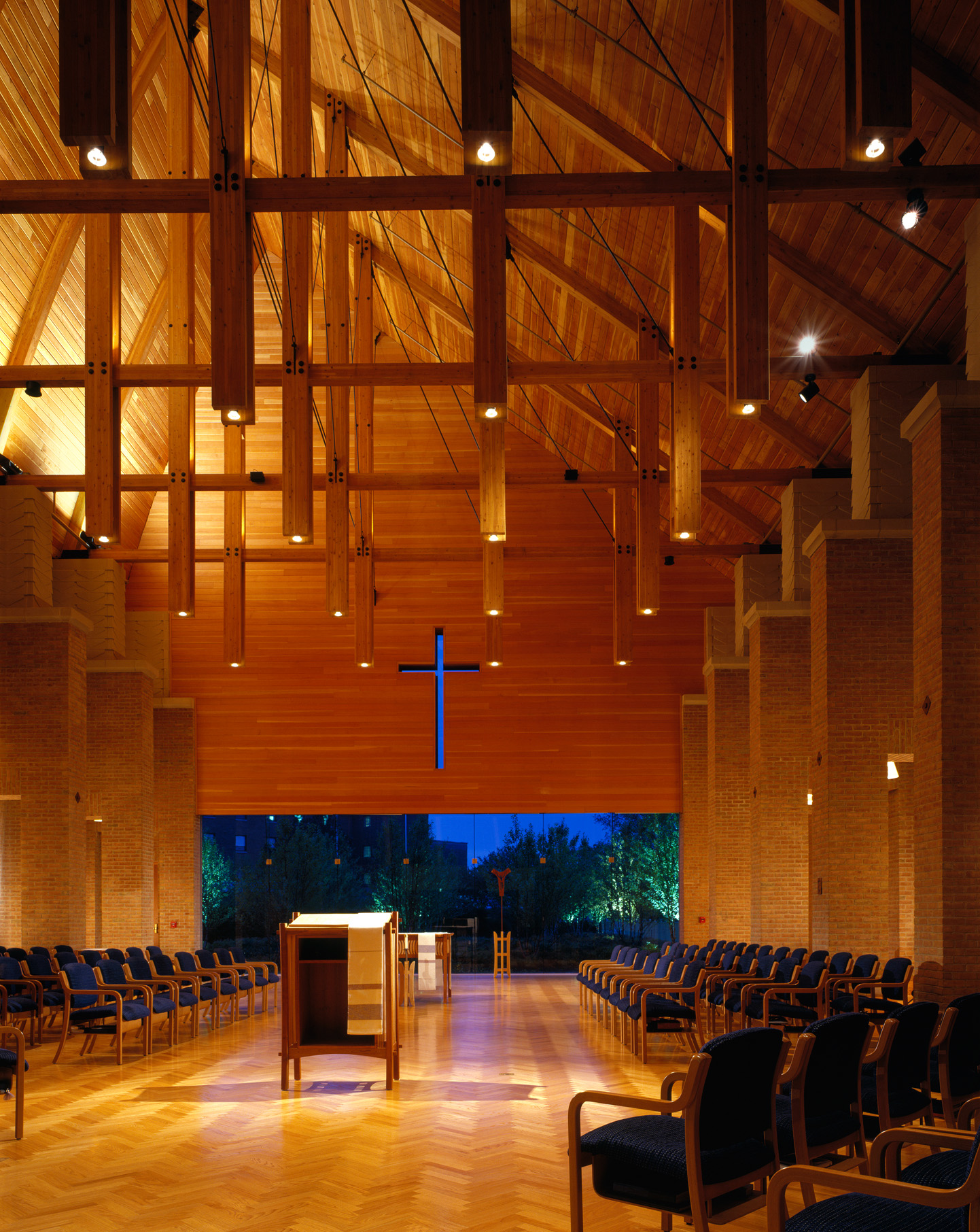
  St. Mary of the Springs chapel

The convent provides independent living facilities including resident rooms, central dining and kitchen, activity rooms, and congregational offices; it is connected to meeting and nursing care facilities via a tunnel. The design of the chapel in particular has received attention. Recipient of Faith & Form Magazine/IFRA Liturgical/Interior Design Award, Masonry Institute Golden Trowel Award, Chicago AIA Interior Architecture Award, and a National AIA Institute Honor Award.

- Oak Park Public Library :: Oak Park, IL

The Library design reflects a transitional location within the Village, with a formal monolithic stone facade facing neighboring institutions and an informal "organic" copper facade facing a park. The glass-fronted main reading room overlooking the park features a wood ceiling undulating above "tree-like" wood columns. The Library is the recipient of the Chicago Building Congress' Award of Merit and Midwest Construction Magazine's Best of 2004 Award for New Library Construction. USA Today listed the Oak Park Public Library as one of the "Ten Great Places to Find a Nook and Read a Book."

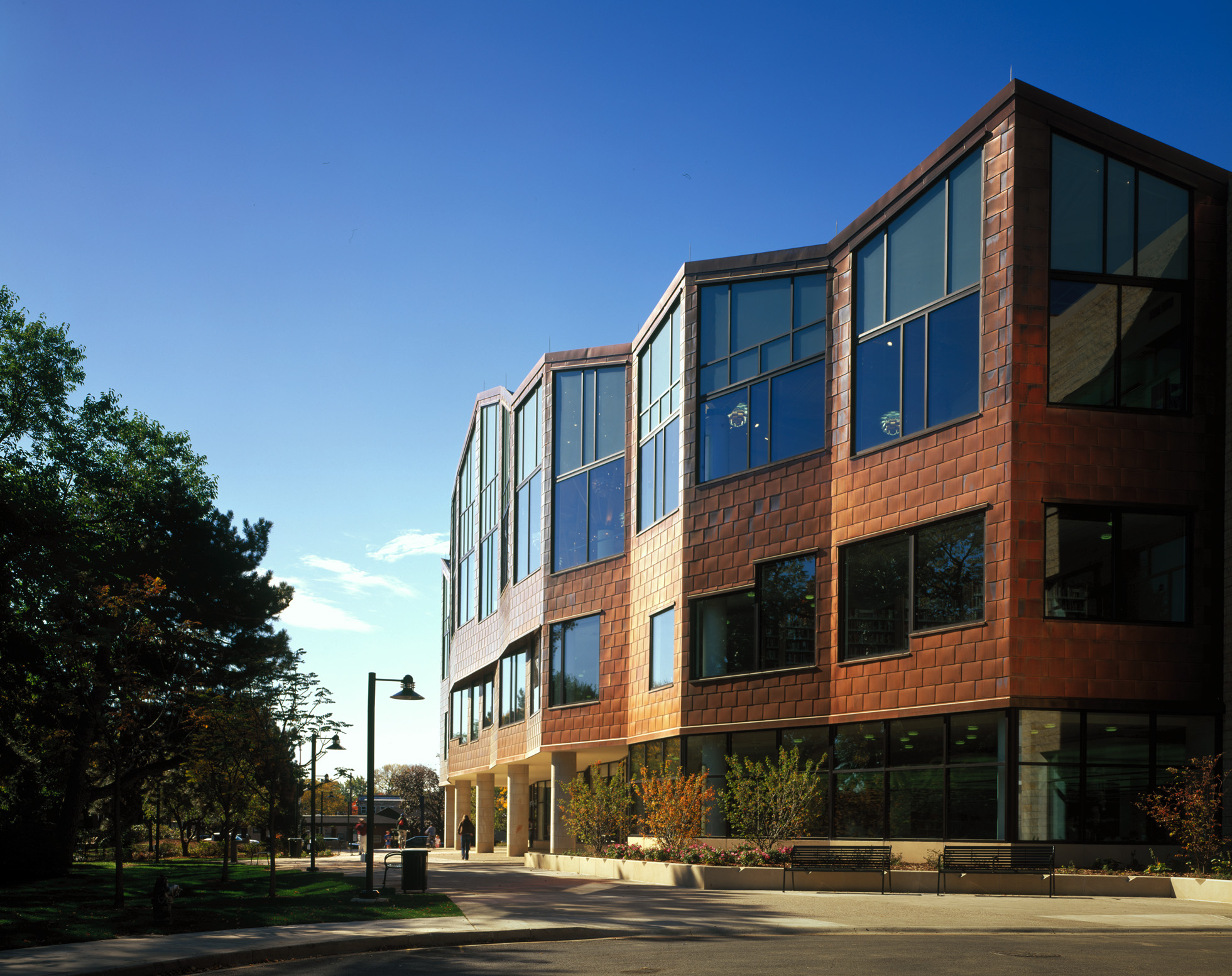
Oak Park Public Library

- Lewis and Clark Visitors Center :: Hartford, IL:The visitors center is sited near where Lewis and Clark prepared the Corps of Discovery before setting forth on their search for the "Northwest Passage." The visitor's progression through the center references these preparations in contrast to the drama of the journey itself. While the entry is modest and low-roofed, the visitor's experience culminates in a "soaring space" occupied by a replica of the Corps' keel boat: "The wedge-shaped form points west and recalls the prow of a ship slicing through the prairie."
- University of Chicago Laboratory Schools :: Chicago, IL

Nagle Hartray was responsible for a master plan iteration in the 1990s, preceding the design and construction of the Middle School addition, Rowley Library renovation, Kovler Gymnasium addition, and the High School science wing renovation. Project awards at the Lab Schools include two "Excellence in Masonry" awards and the Chicago Building Congress "Award of Recognition."

- Lincolnshire Village Hall :: Lincolnshire, IL

Nagle Hartray provided a design for the Village Hall in addition to a master plan for the Lincolnshire village center. An alternate design for the Hall's exterior "reminiscent of the best public buildings of the 1930s and 1940s" won an AIA Chicago Chapter award for unbuilt projects, but the village board approved a more traditional version. The result "is nonetheless a thoroughly modern building, within a pleasingly Romanesque skin."

- Greyhound Bus Terminal :: Chicago, IL

In addition to 35,000 square feet (3,300 m^{2}) of enclosed space, the terminal has 10,000 square feet (930 m^{2}) of space under each of its two bus canopies. The requirement of unobstructed space beneath the canopies' 45-foot (14 m) span informed the structurally expressive profile of "this elegant essay in architectural engineering." Recipient of an Award of Merit from the Structural Engineers Association of Illinois.

== Recognition ==
=== Selected awards ===
- 2009: Chicago AIA Firm Award
- 2008: LAMA/IIDA Library Interior Design Award
- 2007: National AIA Institute Honor Award

=== Selected publications ===
- 2010: "Beach House," 21st Century Houses: 150 of the World's Best
- 2010: "High Impact," Trends: Home & Remodeling
- 2009/10: Residences featured in Ranches of the American West and Lakeside Living
- 2008: "On the Waterfront," Chicago Magazine
- 2006: "St. Mary of the Springs Chapel," Houses of God: Religious Architecture for a New Millennium
- 2005: Houses: The Architecture of Nagle Hartray Danker Kagan McKay Penney

== See also ==
- Architecture of Chicago
- James Nagle
