= Chicago Seven (disambiguation) =

The Chicago Seven, originally Chicago Eight, were a group of American protesters against the Vietnam war.

Chicago Seven may also refer to:

- Chicago Seven (architects), a group of postmodern architects
- Chicago VII, a 1974 album by American rock band Chicago

== See also ==
- The Trial of the Chicago 7, a 2020 American historical legal drama film about the Chicago Seven
