= Margaret McCurry =

American architect

- Born: September 1942 (age 84); Chicago
- Education: Vassar College, AB in Art History; Harvard Graduate School of Design, Loeb Fellowship in Advanced Environmental Studies
- Occupation: Architect
- Spouse: Stanley Tigerman

Margaret McCurry (born 1942) is an American architect and a Fellow of the American Institute of Architects.

== Early life ==
McCurry was born in Chicago in September 1942. She grew up in two Chicago houses designed by her father, architect Paul McCurry, whom she describes as "an intense modernist [who] nonetheless instilled in his children a curiosity about the architecture of other periods." McCurry graduated from Vassar College in 1964 with a degree in art history and literature.

== Career ==
For 11 years McCurry worked in the Chicago office of Skidmore, Owings & Merrill (SOM) where Davis Allen (1916–1999) became her mentor.

While at SOM, the projects she worked on included the interiors of the National Life and Accident Insurance Company in Nashville and the East Wing addition to the Art Institute of Chicago including the School of the Art Institute and the Rubloff Auditorium.

After leaving SOM, McCurry opened her own firm on April Fool's Day 1977. In 1982, she joined forces with her husband, Stanley Tigerman (1930–2019), to found their Chicago-based firm Tigerman McCurry Architects.

She has served as the chair of the American Institute of Architects (AIA) Committee on Design and vice-president of the Illinois chapter of the American Society of Interior Designers.

Some of her projects include the Chicago Bar Association headquarters on Plymouth court, c. 1990, a private apartment on 900 N. Michigan Ave, Chicago, a two-story farmhouse on Lake Michigan, a home in Martha's Vineyard, c. 1995, an update to a midcentury modern home in Chicago written up in Architectural Digest 2009, an article republished by the magazine May 2017.

In 2017, McCurry and her husband Stanley Tigerman announced they will be retiring and closing down their Chicago office.

== Publications ==
McCurry has published two books: Distillations: The Architecture of Margaret McCurry and Margaret McCurry: Constructing Twenty-Five Short Stories.

She and husband Stanley Tigerman published the children's story "Dorothy in Dreamland" in 1991, where Dorothy helps to alter the timelines of four classic fairytales while dreaming of finding her way back to Kansas. It was illustrated by Tigerman.

== Personal life ==
McCurry was married to Stanley Tigerman from 1979 until his death in 2019. She and Tigerman were also principals in their firm, Tigerman-McCurry, from 1982 to 2017. Margaret has written about her life with Stanley and memories at their home at 900-910 North Lake Shore lakefront high-rise apartment built by Mies van der Rohe.

Her astrological sign, Libra, plays greatly into her design instincts - "I'm a Libra. Everything in my world has to be ordered and harmoniously balanced."

== Related links ==
- Fellow of the American Institute of Architects
- American Institute of Architects
- Stanley Tigerman
- List of American architects
