= Lora Marx =

- Born: Lora Hurff Flanegin; 1900; Elmwood, Illinois, U.S.
- Died: 1989 (aged 88–89); Chicago, Illinois, U.S.
- Style: Art Deco
- Spouse: Samuel Abraham Marx (divorced)
- Partner: Mies van der Rohe (m. 1940)

Lora Flanegin Marx (1900–1989) was an American sculptor.

== Biography ==
Lora Hurff Flanegin was born in Elmwood, Illinois, in 1900. Flanegin was married to Samuel Abraham Marx. Soon after their divorce, she met Mies van der Rohe in 1940 and they remained partners until Mies' death in 1969. Lora lived at the 900-910 North Lake Shore high-rise apartments on Chicago's lakefront that were designed by Mies in 1955. Lora died in Chicago in 1989.

== Notable works ==
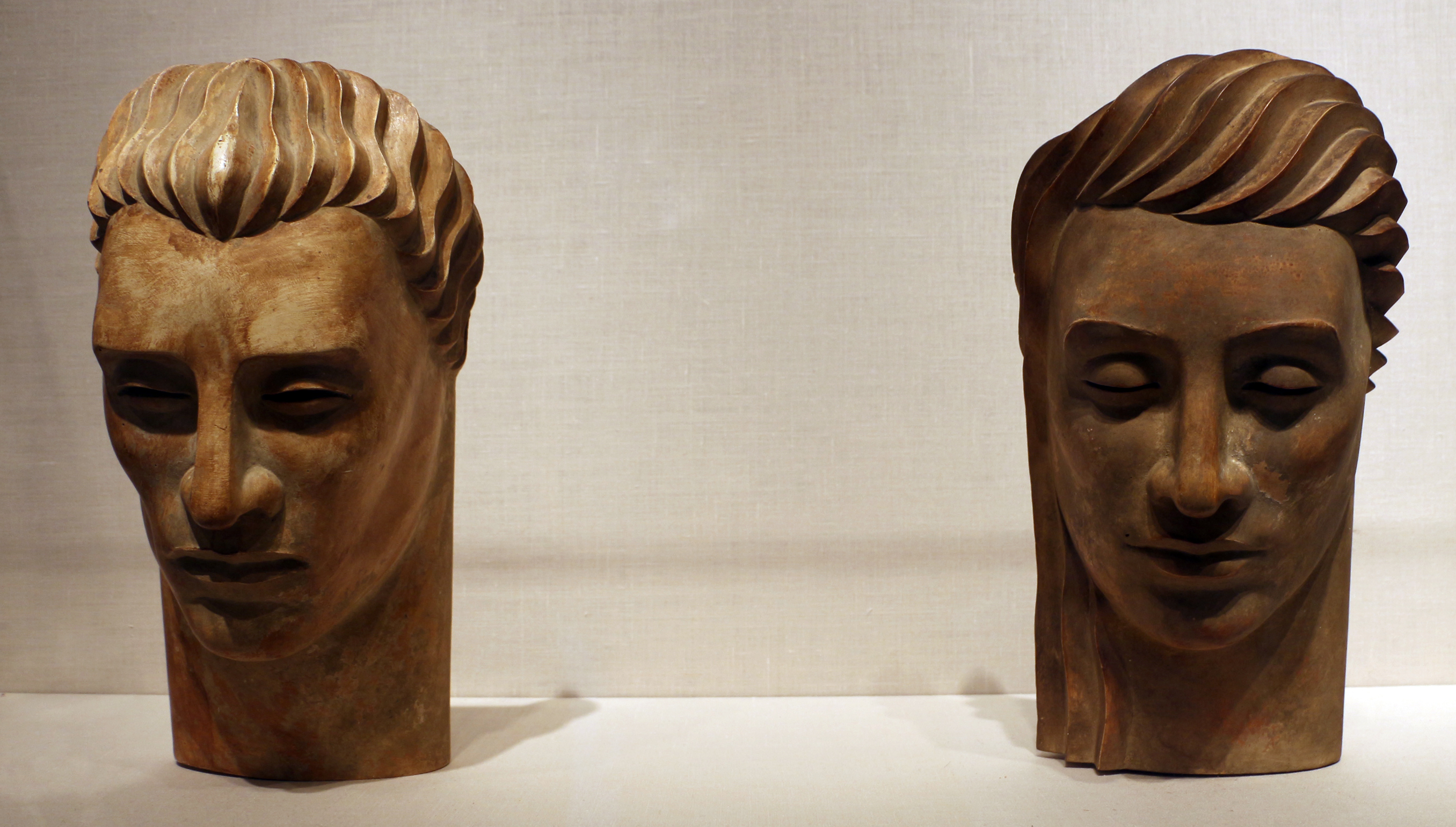
Tavern Club busts, 1937

Lora's art deco sculptures were created for the Tavern Club in Chicago, IL and are a part of the permanent collection of the Art Institute of Chicago.
