= James L. Nagle =

American architect (1937–2021)

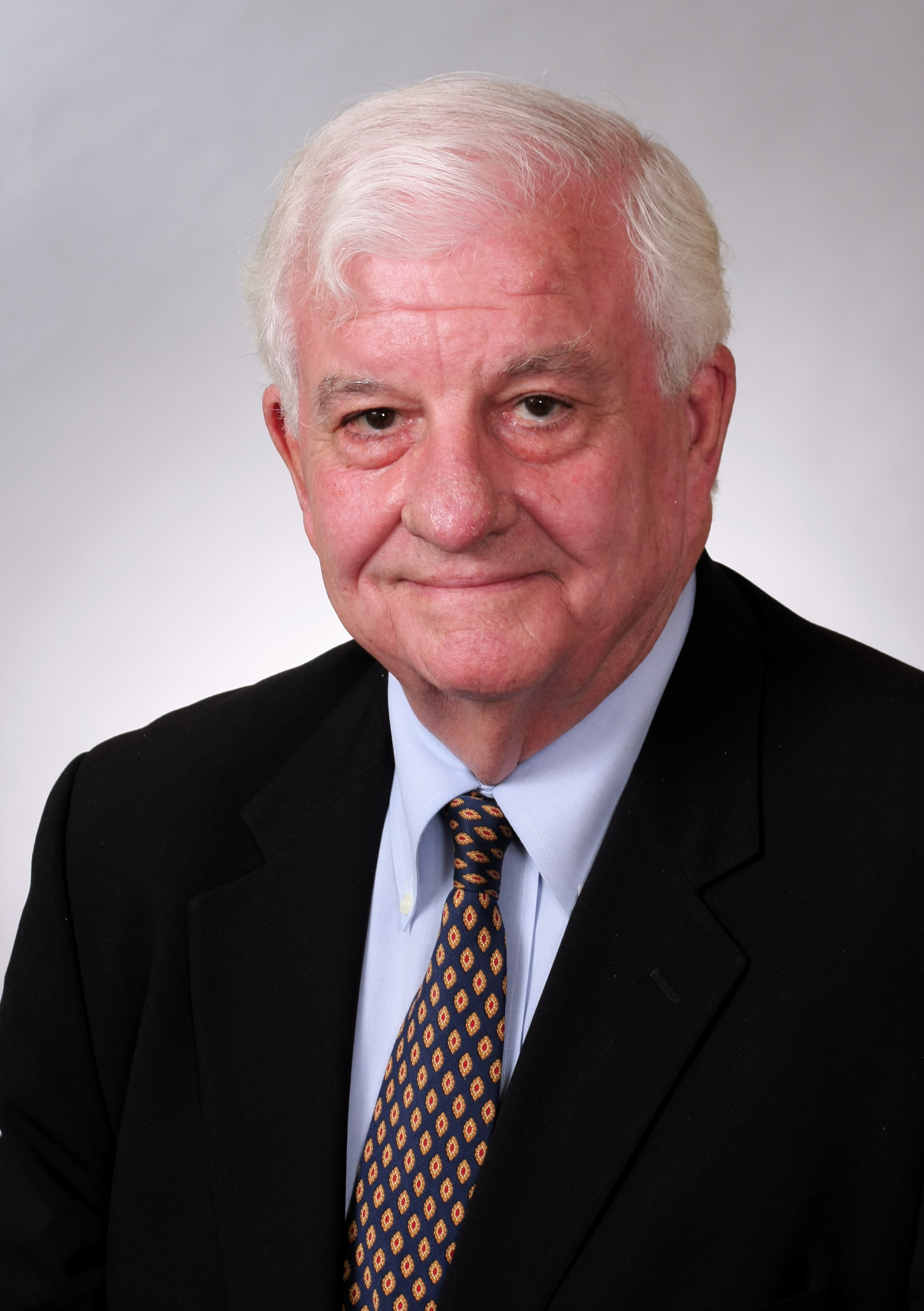
Jim Nagle 2010

James Lee Nagle (August 5, 1937 – January 19, 2021) was an American architect practicing in Chicago. He was noted for being part of the Chicago Seven that supported a diversity in architectural styles beyond internationalism.

== Early life and career ==
Nagle was born in Iowa City, Iowa, in 1937. His family owned a lumber business, where he worked before going to university. He entered the "pre-architecture" program at Stanford University in 1955, obtaining a bachelor's degree from that institution in 1959. In 1960, he was an ensign in the United States Navy stationed at the Boston Naval Shipyard. After serving in the Navy, he proceeded to earn a Bachelor of Architecture from the Massachusetts Institute of Technology in 1962, and a Master of Architecture from Harvard University two years later.

Following his graduation from Harvard, Nagle travelled to the Netherlands as a Fulbright Scholar to study architecture and urbanism. On his return to the United States in 1965, Nagle joined the office of Stanley Tigerman, leaving in 1966 to open a firm with Larry Booth, a fellow architect at Tigerman's office. Nagle left his partnership with Booth in 1981 to establish Nagle Hartray and Associates with Jack Hartray. The firm is known today as Nagle Hartray Architecture.

== Career ==
Nagle taught design at the University of Illinois at Chicago (UIC) and the Illinois Institute of Technology (IIT). He also served as chair of the Board of Overseers for the latter's College of Architecture. He taught, exhibited, and lectured extensively at numerous other schools of architecture. Additionally, he served as Chairman of the AIA National Committee on Design, President of the Chicago Architecture Foundation, President of the Graham Foundation Board, and Design Juror on many State and National Awards Programs. He was a member of the Archeworks Board of Directors, and the Design Matters Advisory Committee.

=== The Chicago Seven ===
In the late 1970s, Nagle became a member of the Chicago Seven, a group led by Tigerman. The movement emerged in opposition to the doctrinal application of modernism, as represented particularly in Chicago by the followers of Ludwig Mies van der Rohe. Nagle later stressed that he was not critical of Mies' style. Rather, he was of the opinion that the style of those who replicated Mies was substandard. He was also at the forefront of heritage preservation in Chicago, having been galvanized by the demolition of the Chicago Stock Exchange Building in 1972. He spearheaded the effort to protect Glessner House, the last surviving building designed by Henry Hobson Richardson in Chicago, spending seven years to refurbish it. The structure went on to be re-adapted as the base for the Chicago chapter of the American Institute of Architects.

The Museum of Contemporary Art, Chicago, organized a reunion of the Chicago Seven in 2005 to discuss the contemporary state of Chicago architecture, Celebrating 25 Years of the Chicago Seven. As part of the panel discussion, Nagle commented on the state of affairs that prompted the intervention of the Chicago Seven: "It wasn't Mies that got boring. It was the copiers that got boring.... You got off an airplane in the 1970s, and you didn't know where you were." In his interview as part of the Chicago Architects Oral Histories Project, Nagle spoke of the work his office was doing at that time: "I remember the reaction to [one of our projects] was, Wow, these guys are changing; they're doing things that are different from what they did before; there's a new movement afoot. So we all got excited about moving on to something that was different. A lot of it really had to do with history. That's what the postmodernist movement was all about. The appreciation of history made us all much better architects. One of the things that I find from 1930s and 1940s architecture is that the people who have gone through the Beaux-Arts understand the history of architecture and for the good architects, such as Alvar Aalto and Corbusier, it probably made them better modernists because they didn't learn through abstraction. Gropius was wrong. You should know your history and understand and be able to operate on those levels and then go on to do your own thing and presumably do something that's original."

== Personal life ==
Nagle was married to Ann Steinbaugh until her death in 2007. They met while studying at Stanford, and resided for over three decades in a brick house in Lincoln Park that he designed in 1979. Together, they had two children: Kathleen and James Jr.

Nagle died on January 19, 2021. He was 83, and suffered from Alzheimer's disease in the time leading up to his death.

== Work ==
=== Selected past work ===
- Sundial House (unbuilt)

James Nagle's entry for the 1976 Chicago Seven exhibit of theoretical house designs, presented at the Richard Gray Gallery on Michigan Avenue. Designed for an abstracted dunes site, the house explores neo-plastic space derived from De Stijl, the forms of Le Corbusier, and the tension between the circle and orthogonal grid. Though it was a theoretical project, it was designed to be buildable, with tight control of form and program within the circle. As Nagle wrote at the time, architecture “should create a harmonic whole and it is best when it achieves a maximum plastic expression while solving the practical requirements.”

- Kinzie Park Tower (Chicago, Illinois)

"This condominium tower achieves what many River North apartment and condo buildings miss. Instead of having balconies sticking out of the facade, on this building they are tucked neatly between each sculptural curve and angle. Those curves also provide unusually expansive views for a great number of units."

- Greyhound Bus Terminal (Chicago, Illinois)

In addition to 35,000 square feet (3,300 m^{2}) of enclosed space, the terminal has 10,000 square feet (930 m^{2}) of space under each of its two bus canopies. The requirement of unobstructed space beneath the canopies’ 45-foot (14 m) span informed the structurally expressive profile of "this elegant essay in architectural engineering." Recipient of an Award of Merit from the Structural Engineers Association of Illinois.

- Homan Square Housing (Chicago, Illinois)

Construction of low-cost housing within an ambitious master plan contributed to the general revitalization of an area that had been in decline since the 1970s. Recipient of the Design Matters: Best Practices in Affordable Housing Award.

- Architect's Cottage (Door County, Wisconsin)
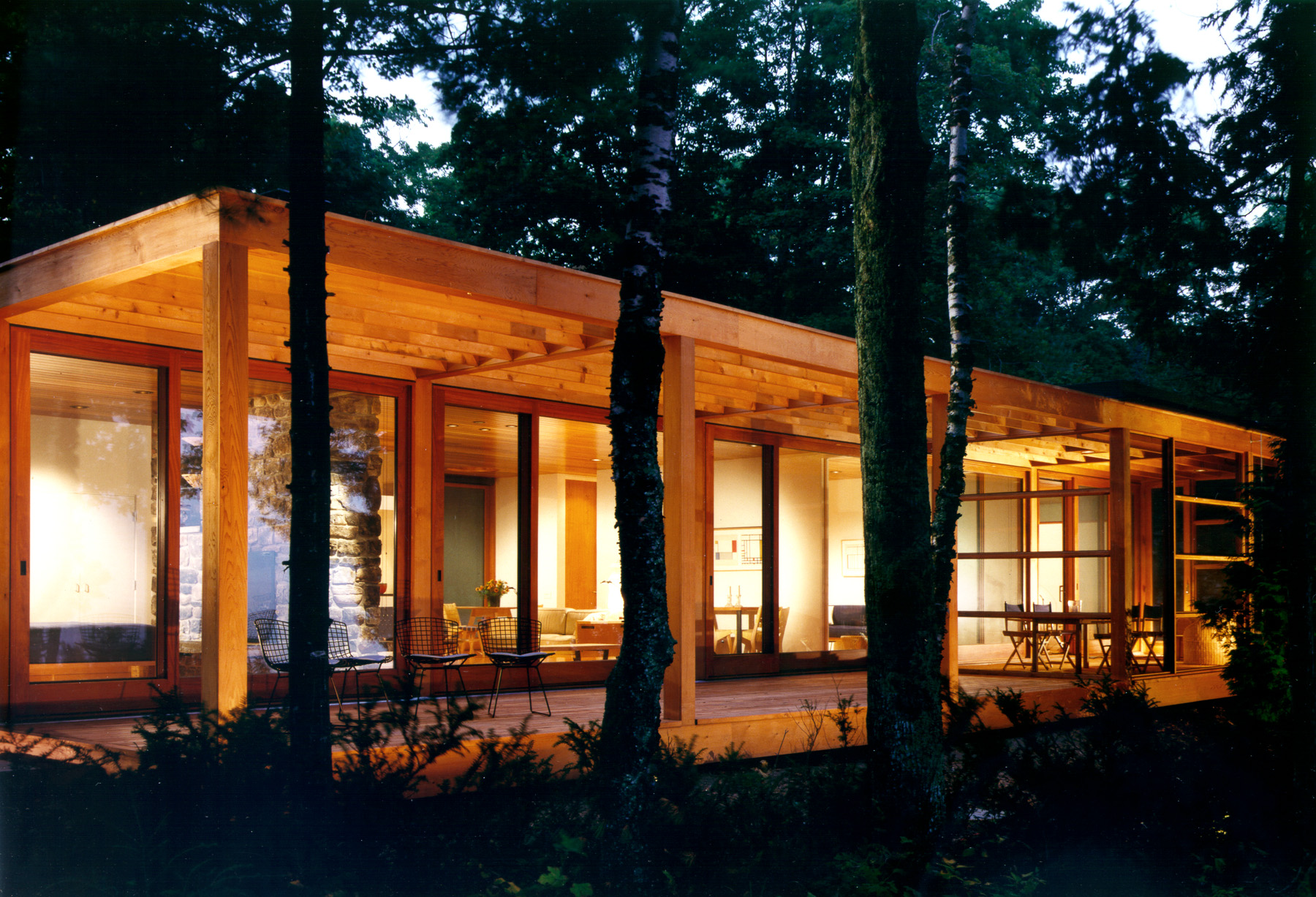
  Architect's Cottage. Hedrich Blessing Photographers.

The pavilion-style cottage is 1,500 square feet (140 m^{2}) in area, plus porches and carport. Materials include clear cedar siding and ceilings, local field stone chimney and walkways, fir floors, birch doors and white plaster partition walls. The clerestory windows and twelve-foot wide rolling glass doors are mahogany-framed. Recipient of the Chicago AIA Distinguished Building Award.

- Dallas Courtyard House (Dallas, Texas)

The house is in large part a gallery designed to accommodate the owner's art and furniture collection. The structure is framed in white painted steel with white aluminum panels and clear and translucent glass infill. Granite and teakwood floors with glass bridges and stairs accent the otherwise white environment. Geothermal wells lie beneath the front yard, and sunscreens and automatic shades are used for energy control. Recipient of the Chicago AIA Distinguished Building Award.

- Northfield House (Northfield, Illinois)
- Dunes Compound (Leelanau County, Michigan)

== See also ==
- Chicago Seven (architects)
