= Preston Eugene Jackson =

American sculptor and painter (born 1944)

- Born: March 1, 1944 (age 82); Decatur, Illinois, US
- Education: BFA, Southern Illinois University; MFA, University of Illinois
- Known for: Painter; sculptor; educator
- Notable work: Fresh from Julieanne’s Garden
- Style: Abstract; realism
- Spouse: Melba Jackson
- Children: 2
- Awards: Lincoln Academy of Illinois; 1998 Laureate

Preston Eugene Jackson (born March 1, 1944) is an American painter, sculptor, and educator who has created many public art sculptures in the Central Illinois area. He works in metal, both steel and foundry cast metals, and also paints. His paintings and sculptures cover many styles, from abstract to "emotionally charged realism." In 1998 he was named the Laureate of the Lincoln Academy of Illinois and received the Order of Lincoln Medallion. He owns The Raven Gallery, home of the Contemporary Art Center in Peoria, Illinois.

Jackson was born on March 1, 1944, in Decatur, Illinois, one of ten children born to T. J. Jackson and Shirley. He received his BFA from Southern Illinois University and his MFA degree from the University of Illinois in 1972. He is married to Melba Jackson, with whom he have two daughters.

Jackson's traveling sculpture exhibit "Fresh from Julieanne’s Garden" features more than 100 unique bronze castings of people of color telling fictionalized stories of their lives from the 17th through 20th centuries. Jackson received a Regional Emmy for hosting "Legacy in Bronze" a television show featuring these sculptures. In 2018 he was voted one of the best Illinois artists of all time as part of The Illinois Top 200 project.

Jackson began his career as a professor of art at Western Illinois University from 1972 to 1989. He later moved to the Art Institute of Chicago in 1989 as a professor of sculpture. He was appointed chair of the Sculpture Department from 1994 through 1996 and is currently a Professor Emeritus.
