= 900–910 North Lake Shore =

Skyscraper in Chicago, Illinois

Coordinates: 41.8996136°N 87.6197185°W

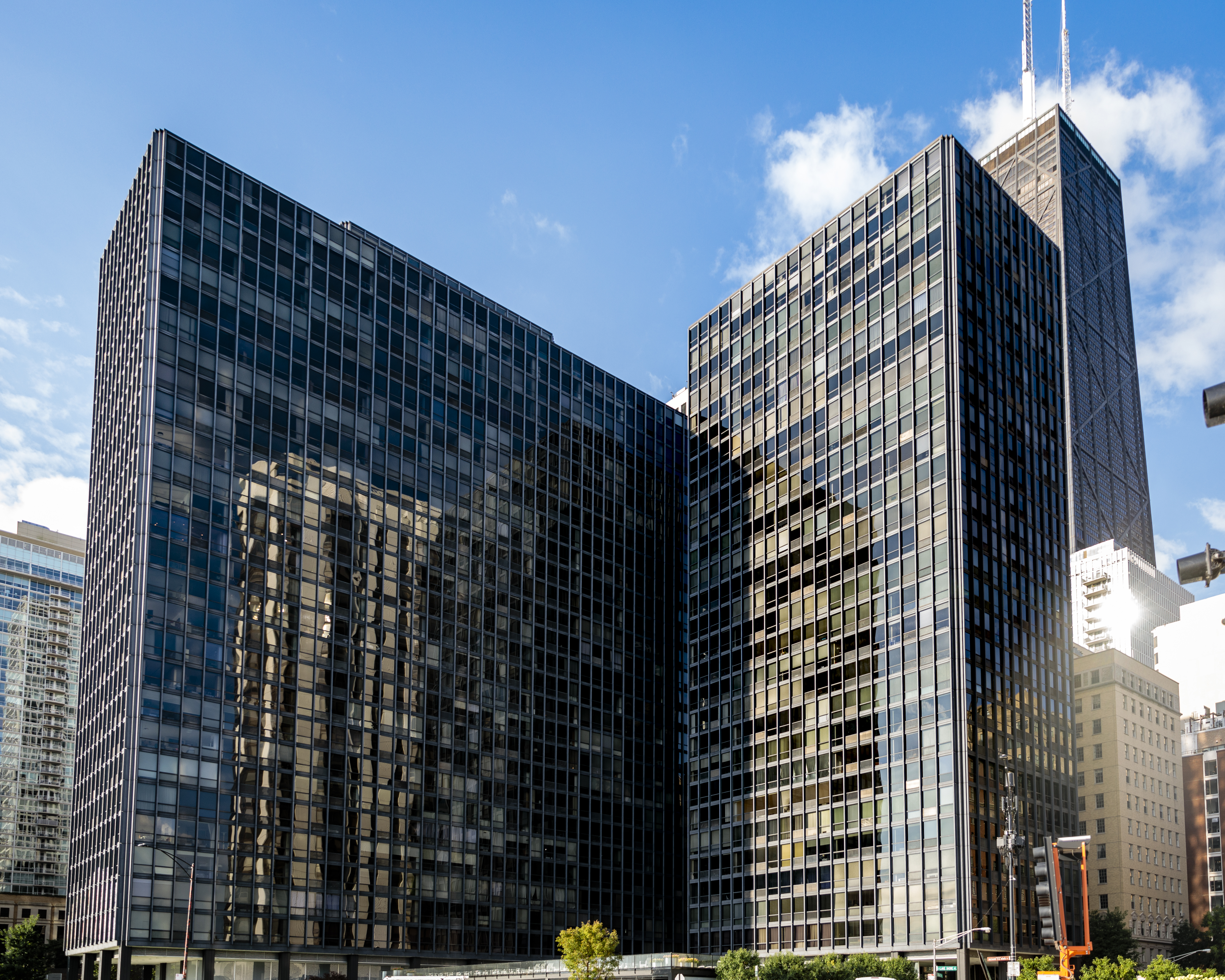
900–910 N Lake Shore Drive

900–910 North Lake Shore are a pair of glass and steel buildings, perpendicular to one another, designed by architect Ludwig Mies van der Rohe, on Lake Shore Drive in the Streeterville neighborhood of Chicago, Illinois, US. Completed in 1956, they marked the refinement of Mies' highrise building design concept. The buildings are built to a Modernist International style that was considered to be a departure from the dominant aesthetic at the time they were built, and even criticized as too minimal. The "glass houses" are more often appreciated for the views they offer of Lake Michigan and downtown Chicago. The buildings were referred to as "giant mirrors for lake beauty".

== Herbert Greenwald ==
The developer of the buildings, Herbert Greenwald, worked with Mies for roughly a decade on several residential highrise projects that preceded and followed 900–910 including Mies' first skyscraper, the Promontory Apartments, located south in Hyde Park, and the sister buildings to the southeast, 860-880 Lake Shore Drive Apartments. Like 860–880, 900–910 is built on a 21-foot (6.4 m) grid, and located 21 feet (6.4 m) west of the west column centerline of 880.

Greenwald was a fan of modernist architecture and design. After attending the University of Chicago, he was eager to find an architect who could partner with him on real estate projects along the Chicago lakeshore. Walter Gropius, who had appointed Mies to replace him as head of the Bauhaus before immigrating to the United States, again recommended him for the job. Mies was selected among the three top architects at the time with Le Corbusier and Frank Lloyd Wright.

Greenwald once said "I'm going to build Mies buildings from New York to San Francisco". However, in 1959, Greenwald died suddenly at age 44 along with 64 other passengers in the plane crash of American Airlines Flight 320. Thus, he was unable to witness the final execution of some project collaborations with Mies that were partially built or underway. 900–910 was his last fully completed project.

== The Curtain Wall ==
The curtain wall perfected at 900–910 is among the most notable of Mies' design elements, and he reproduced it repeatedly in all of his highrise building designs thereafter. The curtain appears as an uninterrupted sheet of glass that stands apart from the buildings' structural skeleton as a separate, continuous element.

The curtain wall was first conceived in the designs for the Promontory Apartments, but went unrealized due to a steel shortage. At 860–880 Lake Shore, Mies managed to achieve the look of the curtain wall, but–with the windows attached to the structure rather than the mullions–it wasn't fully realized as a curtain wall. Finally, at 900–910 Mies finally created an autonomous aluminum and glass skin.

The skin is reinforced by concrete columns at the lower stories, steel columns in the upper stories, and covered with prefabricated aluminum frame placed outside the structural frame. Mullions are recessed so the windows–taller than they are wide–are uniform in size and achieve a ratio perfectly pleasing to the naked eye.

The glass skin in front of the columns allows the buildings to be protected from temperature fluctuations. Heating and air conditioning systems were installed in the space between the concrete columns and skin mullions. Thus, the buildings were deemed technologically advanced and in keeping with the American Zeitgeist. They were also the tallest concrete buildings in Chicago at the time they were constructed, and the first with a flat-slab concrete frame.

== Mies in America ==
Having immigrated from Europe due to the Nazi era, Chicago became the center of Mies van der Rohe's life's work, where by far the majority of his buildings were designed and reside. Oft cited for his "rational" approach to building design, Mies' architectural philosophy began with articulating a vision, then determining how to make it feasible from an engineering standpoint. The son of a stonemason, Mies was ever attentive to materials. Certainly, his discovery–and the abundance of–steel in Chicago defined his expression of modernism from then on The Verdi marble in the lobby at 900–910 gives the building an aura of lasting elegance.

It is thought that the particular climate of the United States at which Mies arrived provided the ideal fertile ground for him to develop his ideas. He was brought to Chicago upon offer of a stable position at the Armour Institute (which later became Illinois Institute of Technology), where he not only acted as head of the architecture school but designed the campus, including the Crown Hall. He had the freedom to pursue his professional projects, often recruiting his best students to join him in his practice.

== Joseph Fujikawa ==
One of those students was Joseph Fujikawa. While the 900–910 building design was distinctly Miesian, Fujikawa can be credited for managing the project and meticulously overseeing details in its execution so that it accomplished its original vision. During the detailing of 900–910, Mies was frequently in New York City working on his famed Seagram Building. Thus, Fujikawa worked alongside Herbert Greenwald, as architectural overseer of the project. After Greenwald died, Fujikawa continued to manage the completion of all his projects.

Fujikawa's relationship with Mies began when he was a student at the IIT School of Architecture. After joining the army for a year, he returned to work for Mies' then 4 or 5-person firm as an associate. At the time, the firm wasn't highly profitable but Mies kept his staff on, eventually growing the firm to about 35 people.

In Fujikawa's retelling of his experience working with Mies as a student, Mies was warm and attentive–quite unlike the stoic and unfeeling persona that is often attributed to him. Fujikawa believed Mies to be mostly shy and liked his buildings to speak for him, rather than to speak on his own behalf. He often joined his students from IIT for dinner after class at Marx's on Adams street, where they particularly liked the lambchop.

== Architecture community ==
Mies was notoriously private. It is believed that the primarily reason he never lived in any of his own buildings was to avoid inevitable chitchat and questions about the buildings from other residents sharing the elevator. However, the buildings were home to many architects and designers over the years. Several partners and associates from the architecture firm, Skidmore, Owings and Merrill lived in 900–910. SOM took over the IIT commission when Mies retired and readily imitated the aesthetic of his highrise building designs.

Many members of the tightknit architecture community lived at 900–910 over the years. Mies' direct colleagues and collaborators like Walter Peterhans; his wife Brigitte Peterhans (who worked for SOM) and Mies' own grandson, Dirk Lohan, all occupied the buildings at one time. Lohan became one of the three partners to take over Mies' firm over upon his retirement along with Fujikawa and Bruno Conterato. Other residents include architects Margaret McCurry, who has written about her experience living at 900–910, and Stanley Tigerman of Tigerman McCurry Architects, and Mies' longtime romantic partner, sculptor Lora Marx.

== The Bauhaus ==
Mies acted as the last director of the Bauhaus art school in Germany before it was entirely disbanded by the Nazi party. For that reason, and because his own style had such a strong influence on the architects who studied with him or were inspired by his work, he is frequently referred to as Bauhaus. However, he didn't particularly identify his own style as Bauhaus. He did reassemble some of his former colleagues from the Bauhaus by securing them faculty positions at IIT, including Walter Peterhans, Ludwig Hilberseimer, and John Barney Rodgers.

At the same time Mies came to Chicago so did another former leader of the Bauhaus and favorite of Gropius, László Moholy-Nagy, to open an eclectic and multidisciplinary design school. Much to Mies' chagrin, Moholy named it The New Bauhaus. It was later renamed the Institute of Design and absorbed into IIT. There is much adversarial discord on record between Mies and Moholy. Mies viewed Moholy as an embodiment of "frivolous experimentation" that he disliked most about the Bauhaus.

== The Esplanade ==
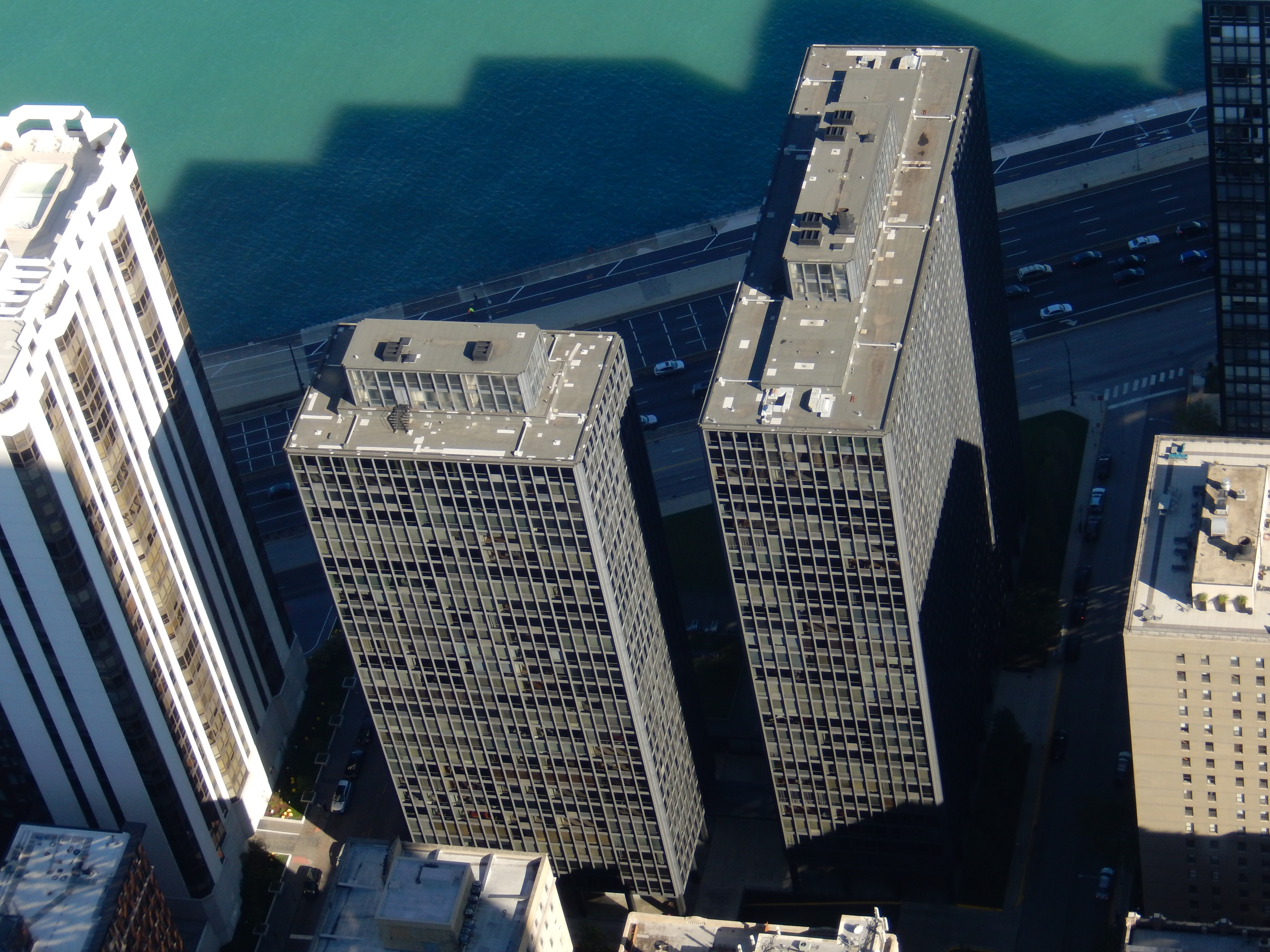
Looking down on 900–910 Lake Shore Drive from John Hancock Center

900–910 has colloquially been referred to as the Esplanade Apartments, for which there are several possible reasons. Early drawings of the buildings were labeled the "Esplanade Apartments" and they were marketed as such in later years with the name appearing in collateral and on signage. Some drawings labeled as such were exhibited at the Museum of Modern Art and remain part of the museum's permanent Mies van der Rohe archives. Museum of Modern Art.

Lastly, the unique sundeck between the two buildings on top of the parking structure is sometimes referred to as the Esplanade. The sundeck has served multiple purposes over the decades since 900–910 were built, offering residents a meeting place for evening cocktails and views of the Navy Pier fireworks.

== 900–910 and art ==
Like many of Mies' buildings, 900–910 has become something of a museum. A Richard Hunt cor-ten steel sculpture "Fox Box Hybrid" sits on the lawn. From the southside of Chicago, Hunt broke ground as an African-American sculptor creating public works, many of which can be found in the permanent collections of the top museums across the United States. The lobby at 910 displays a bronze Virginio Ferrari sculpture. Further inside, they live among an extensive, curated collection of 150 works of art displayed in the public spaces. Inside, the buildings house over 150 collector's pieces displayed in resident common spaces.

In 2019, Israeli artist Assaf Evron, who resides in Chicago, created Collage for the Esplanade Apartments public art piece, displayed in thirty of the lower units facing Lake Shore Drive. Residents joined in a celebratory unveiling of the piece. Evron was inspired both by Mies' connection of architecture and nature, as well as his upbringing in Tel Aviv–home to many Bauhaus buildings.

Photographs taken between 2017 and 2018 of the buildings–including interior shots inside some of the residents' apartments–are included in the book Living with Mies, by German photographer Arina Dähnick.

== Management and renovations ==
By today's buildings codes and restrictions, the design of the 900–910 buildings can never be reproduced again. The buildings were converted from apartments to condominiums in 1979. They are managed by the Community Specialist management group, and overseen by the association board's architecture committee–composed primarily of resident architects. The committee goes to painstaking lengths to ensure that any updates or changes to the historic buildings are in keeping with Mies' original intention.

Occasionally custom work is required to maintain the buildings' aesthetic, such as the die cut numbers in the elevator. The firm Eifler & Associates created the sheltered stairwell to the resident underground parking garage. 900–910 is a member of the Streeterville Organization of Active Residents (SOAR) along with many other residential buildings in the neighbourhood.

== Statistics ==
- 29 stories
- 524 Units
- The buildings are perpendicular to one another, built on a 21-foot grid, and 21 feet west of the west column centerline of 880
