= Stanley Tigerman =

American architect (1930–2019)

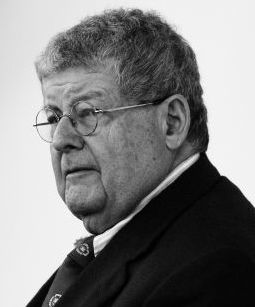
- Born: September 20, 1930; Chicago, Illinois, U.S.
- Died: June 3, 2019 (aged 88); Chicago, Illinois, U.S.
- Education: Massachusetts Institute of Technology; Yale University (MArch)
- Spouse: Margaret McCurry (m. 1979)
- Children: 2

Stanley Tigerman (September 20, 1930 – June 3, 2019) was an American architect, theorist and designer.

== Biography ==
=== Early years ===
Tigerman was born into a Jewish family, the only child of Emma (Stern), a typist for the federal government, and Samuel Tigerman, an engineer whose career struggled by the Depression. He grew up in his paternal grandparents' boardinghouse in Edgewater, Chicago. He won the 'beautiful baby' contest at the 1933 World's Fair. When he was a child, he wanted to be a musician and took six years of piano lessons. At Senn High School he studied jazz.

=== Education and apprenticeships ===
He studied at Massachusetts Institute of Technology, but flunked out after one year. After, the dean of architecture at MIT helped Tigerman get an apprenticeship with Chicago architect George Fred Keck. After a year with Keck, he left to start his own practice, which failed. He then joined the U.S. Navy for four years, serving in the Korean War. After the navy, he returned to Chicago and worked for two years for A.J. Del Bianco doing suburban architecture; then with Milton Schwartz on the Executive House Hotel; and then as junior designer for Skidmore Owings & Merrill on the Air Force Academy. In 1958, Tigerman was officially an architect through his many years of apprenticeships, and he wrote to MIT, IIT, Yale, and Harvard to apply to their graduate programs, though he still did not have a bachelor's degree. MIT and Harvard told him he would have to come back as an undergraduate, but after an interview with chairman Paul Rudolph, the Yale School of Architecture allowed Tigerman to enter a graduate program. While at Yale, he worked nights at Rudolph's architectural office. After two years, he graduated from the Yale School of Architecture with a Masters in 1961.

=== Architectural career ===
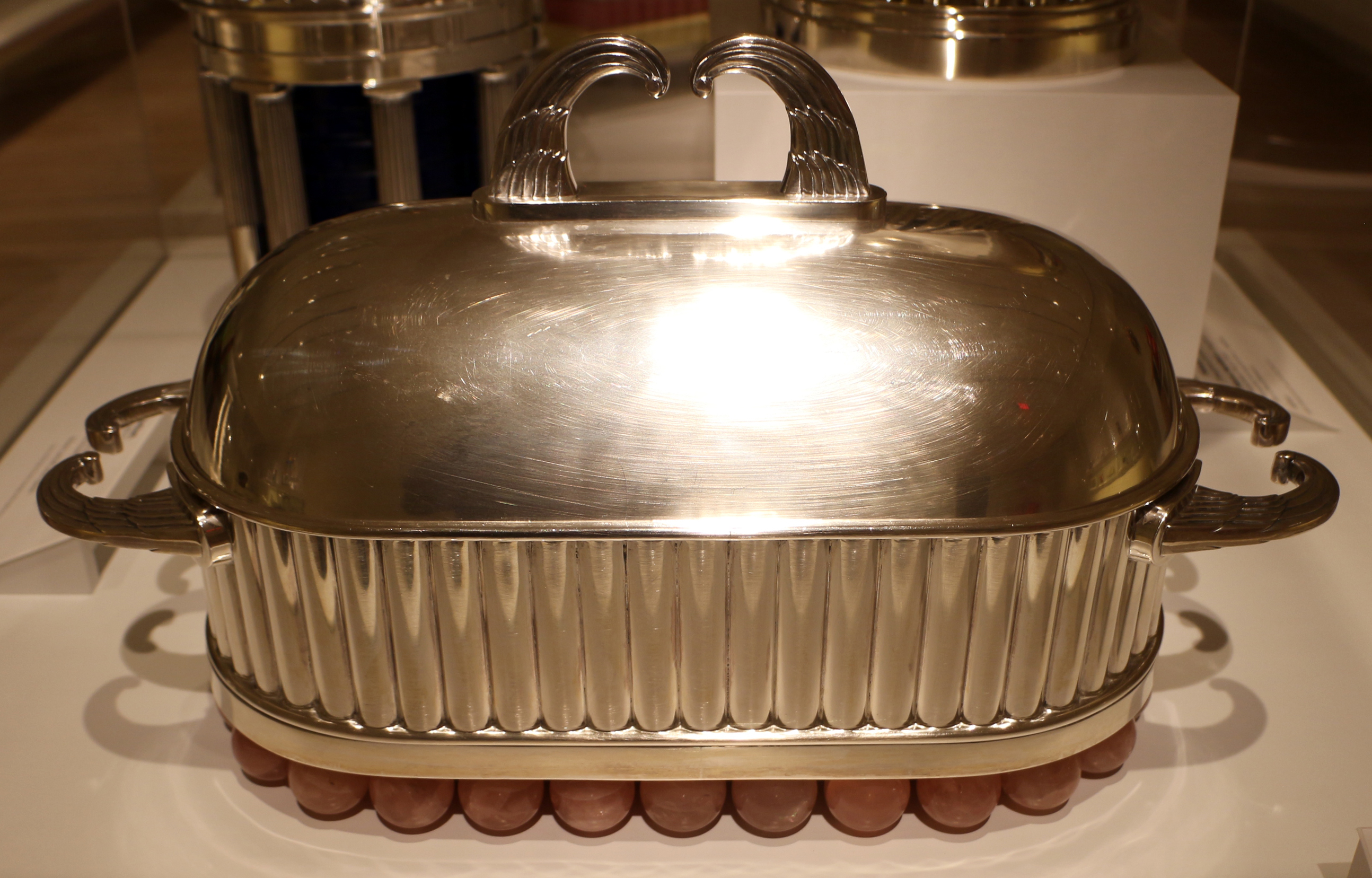
Tureen, 1990; Designed by Tigerman, fabricated by Michael Brophy. Made of sterling silver and plastic, with rose quartz spheres for feet.

In 1961, Tigerman established a small practice. From 1964 until his retirement in 2017, Tigerman was a principal of Stanley Tigerman and Associates Ltd. (later, Tigerman McCurry Architects), in Chicago. He also taught at several universities in the United States. A collection of his papers is held by the Ryerson & Burnham Libraries in the Art Institute of Chicago.

The residential apartment building originally named "Boardwalk Apartments", located at the southeast corner of Montrose and Clarendon Avenues and completed in 1974, was Tigerman's first built project inspired by Mies van der Rohe.

During his early career, Tigerman borrowed extensively from an eclectic blend of styles. In 1976, he was the central figure of the Chicago Seven, a group which emerged in opposition to the doctrinal application of modernism, as represented particularly in Chicago by the followers of Ludwig Mies van der Rohe. Tigerman contributed a postmodern architectural facade to the Strada Novissima in The Presence of the Past exhibit at the 1980 Venice Biennale.

In later years, Tigerman's diverse design style progressively assumed more sensual and dramatic qualities. Tigerman's early skill with curves and perspective expanded to include organic shapes, bright color, topiary, and allegory. From the days of his early eclectic stylings, Tigerman developed into an idiosyncratic theorist.

Tigerman's architectural achievements included the designs for institutional projects such as The Five Polytechnic Institutes in Bangladesh, The Illinois Holocaust Museum and Education Center in Skokie, Illinois, the Illinois Regional Library for the Blind and Physically Handicapped in Chicago, and the POWERHOUSE Energy Museum in Zion, Illinois. Tigerman designed both mixed use high-rise and low-rise housing throughout the United States, and in Germany and Japan. He worked in Bangladesh with Louis I Kahn and Muzharul Islam. His broad ranging collaborations included projects such as The Chicago Central Area Plan, 1992 Chicago World's Fair, and London's Kings' Cross and St. Pancras High Density Mixed Use Urban Plan.

In the early 1980s, he partnered with his third wife, Margaret McCurry, also an architect, to form Tigerman McCurry Architects. While McCurry primarily designed homes for wealthy clients, Tigerman's focus was on bringing architect to underprivileged communities, with the design of a homeless shelter in Chicago called the Pacific Garden Mission and an Anti-Cruelty Society animal shelter. Sometimes McCurry and Tigerman collaborated on projects, but they typically worked on their own projects.

In May 2017, Tigerman closed his Chicago office and announced that he was retiring from active practice, but that his wife, Margaret McCurry, would carry on the work of the firm, Tigerman McCurry Architects. Tigerman is credited with over 390 projects, and over 175 built works, representing almost every building type.

=== Other work ===
Tigerman designed exhibition installations for museums in the United States, Portugal and Puerto Rico. In 1976, he helped organize a museum exhibition titled "Chicago Architects" highlighting work from lesser-known architects that he thought were overlooked in Chicago's modernist architectural history. In 1988, Tigerman designed an exhibition at the Art Institute of Chicago on the architectural history of Chicago.

Tigerman was director of the School of Architecture at the University of Illinois at Chicago from 1988 until he was fired in 1993, after his outspokenness style was not appreciated by the university administration. In 1994, Tigerman and the designer Eva L. Maddox co-founded Archeworks, a nonprofit institute in Chicago for students focused on urban problems. Tigerman was director at Archeworks for 15 years.

In addition to architecture, Tigerman designed products, such as tableware for the Swid Powell Company, a cookie jar, a coffee and tea set, and watches for Projects.

Tigerman wrote several books, including Versus: An American Architect's Alternatives in 1982, a monograph of his work in 1989, and Architecture of Exile.

== Personal life ==
Tigerman was married three times. He had a son and daughter from his first marriage. In 1979, he married his third wife Margaret McCurry, an Episcopalian, a fellow architect. They were married 40 years and lived at 900-910 North Lake Shore apartments designed by Mies van der Rohe on Chicago's lakefront. He died on June 3, 2019, aged 88.

== See also ==
- Chicago Seven (architects)
