= 155 North Wacker =

Office skyscraper in Chicago, Illinois

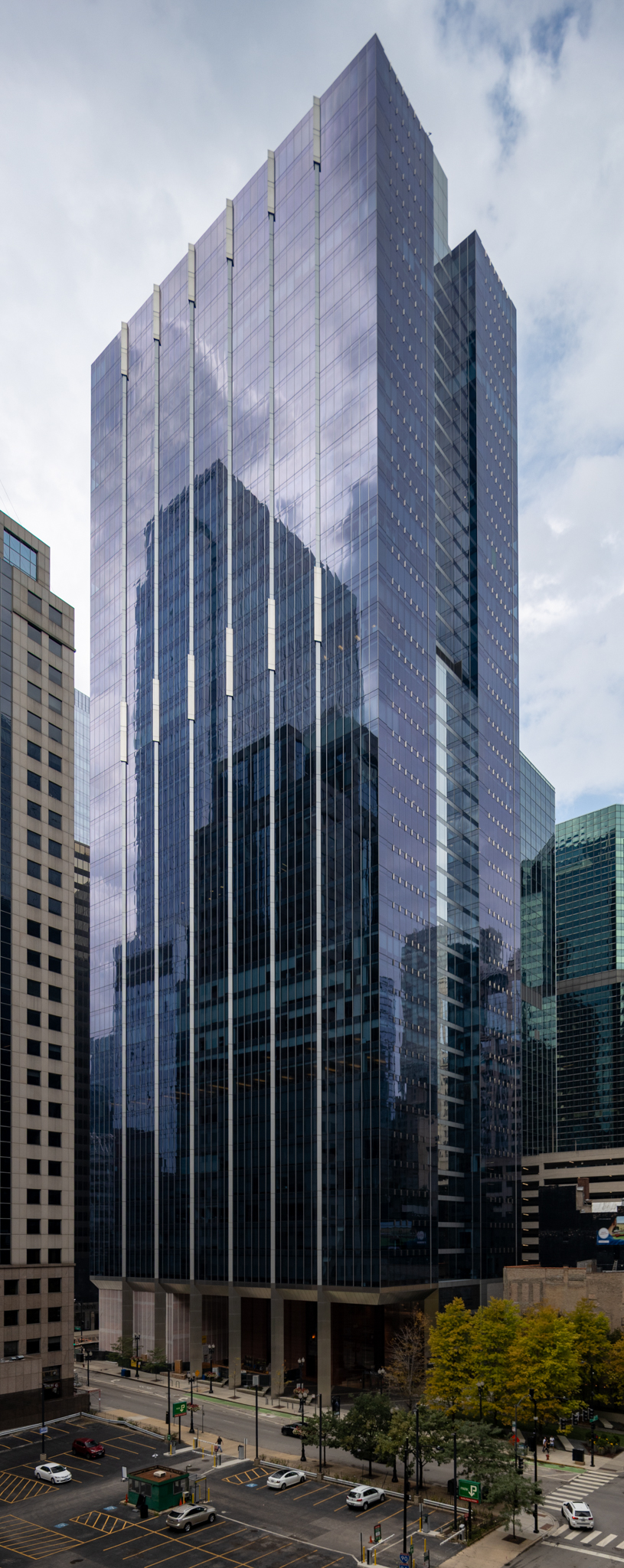
- 155 North Wacker Drive
- Interactive map of the 155 North Wacker area

General information
- Status: Completed
- Type: Commercial office
- Coordinates: 41.884750°N 87.636400°W
- Completed: 2010
- Cost: USD 905M
- Owner: Bannister Trust

Height
- Roof: 195 m (640 ft)
- Top floor: 178 m (584 ft)

Technical details
- Floor count: 45
- Floor area: 115,906 m^{2} (1,247,600 sq ft)
- Lifts/elevators: 21

Design and construction
- Structural engineer: Magnusson Klemencic Associates
- Main contractor: Bovis Lend Lease

Other information
- Parking: 163

155 North Wacker is a 48-story skyscraper located in Chicago, Illinois designed by Goettsch Partners and was developed by the John Buck Company. It stands 638 feet (195 m). It has received LEED silver pre-certification. The construction started in 2007 and was completed in 2010. The building is featured in Transformers Dark of The Moon as the building the Driller destroys.

== See also ==
- List of tallest buildings in Chicago
