= Chicago Seven (architects) =

Group of architects in Chicago, US

The Chicago Seven was a first-generation postmodern group of architects in Chicago. The original Seven were Stanley Tigerman, Larry Booth, Stuart Cohen, Ben Weese, James Ingo Freed, Tom Beeby and James L. Nagle.

== Motivation ==
Rebelling against the oppressive institutionalized predominance of the doctrine of modernism, as represented by the followers of Ludwig Mies van der Rohe, the Chicago Seven architects were looking for new forms, a semantic content and historical references in their buildings. Nagle commented on the state of affairs that prompted the intervention of the Chicago Seven: "It wasn't Mies that got boring. It was the copiers that got boring,... You got off an airplane in the 1970s, and you didn't know where you were."

The Seven brought their ideas to a broader audience through their teaching, exhibitions and symposia. At least three (Tigerman, Booth and Beeby) taught at the University of Illinois Chicago in the early 1980s.

== Origins, development and further members ==
The nucleus of the group formed in protest against the travelling exhibition One Hundred Years of Architecture in Chicago about to be shown in 1976 at the Museum of Contemporary Art, Chicago. The organizers put such an exclusive emphasis on the role played by Mies, his predecessors and followers, that it distorted the historical reality. This aroused the criticism of Tigerman, Cohen, Booth and Weese who simultaneously mounted a counter-show in the Time-Life Building which attracted nationwide attention.

Quickly dubbed the Chicago Four, with the addition of Freed, Beeby and Nagle, they soon expanded into the Chicago Seven. They embraced this name as it paid homage to the anti-Vietnam war protesters known as the Chicago Seven who stood trial in the city from September 1969 until February 1970.

The name stuck even after they were joined by Helmut Jahn for the 1978 project "the exquisite corpse" which produced variations on the Chicago townhouse to "demonstrate the harmonious variety of a cityscape allowed to develop through minimally controlled 'accident'." These townhouses were characterised by their abandoning the modernist rules, the modification of the structural grid, the introduction of barrel vaults and historical references. As Nagle put it, "a lot of it really had to do with history... The appreciation of history made us all much better architects." Beeby's townhouse was strongly influenced by Palladio and the facade even sported a Serliana.

The group was further enlarged by the inclusion of Gerald Horn, Kenneth Schroeder and Cynthia Weese. However, the members were a heterogeneous bunch and, according to Beeby, "didn't agree on anything". Yet, "despite the reliance on form, sometimes ironic and sometimes nostalgic, this was the first broadly conceptualized alternative to Chicago's modernist architectural canon."

== Aftermath ==
In 2005, the Chicago Architectural Club organized a reunion of the Chicago Seven at Chicago's Museum of Contemporary Art, Celebrating 25 Years of the Chicago Seven, to discuss the contemporary state of Chicago architecture. Tigerman did not attend.
