= Billy Pierce =

American baseball player (1927–2015)

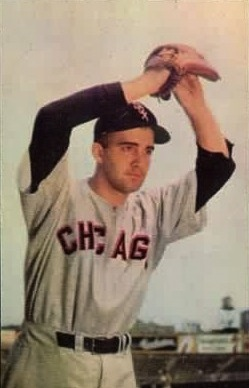
- Pierce in 1953
- Pitcher
- Born: April 2, 1927; Detroit, Michigan, U.S.
- Died: July 31, 2015 (aged 88); Palos Heights, Illinois, U.S.
- Batted: Left Threw: Left

MLB debut
- June 1, 1945, for the Detroit Tigers

Last MLB appearance
- October 3, 1964, for the San Francisco Giants

MLB statistics
- Win–loss record: 211–169
- Earned run average: 3.27
- Strikeouts: 1,999
- Stats at Baseball Reference

Teams
- Detroit Tigers (1945, 1948); Chicago White Sox (1949–1961); San Francisco Giants (1962–1964)

Career highlights and awards
- 7× All-Star (1953, 1955–1959, 1961); World Series champion (1945); AL wins leader (1957); MLB ERA leader (1955); AL strikeout leader (1953); Chicago White Sox No. 19 retired

Walter William Pierce (April 2, 1927 – July 31, 2015) was an American starting pitcher in Major League Baseball between 1945 and 1964 who played most of his career for the Chicago White Sox. He was the team's star pitcher in the decade from 1952 to 1961, when they posted the third best record in the major leagues, and received the Sporting News Pitcher of the Year Award for the American League (AL) in 1956 and 1957 after being runner-up in both 1953 and 1955. A seven-time All-Star, he led the AL in complete games three times despite his slight build, and in wins, earned run average (ERA) and strikeouts once each. He pitched four one-hitters and seven two-hitters in his career, and on June 27, 1958 came within one batter of becoming the first left-hander in 78 years to throw a perfect game.

He was one of the principal figures in Chicago's fierce rivalry with the New York Yankees; particularly notable were his matchups with Whitey Ford, with the two left-handers opposing one another as starters 14 times from 1955 to 1960. Pierce's record suffered from pitching so much against New York – who he faced more often than any other team – when the Yankees dynasty was at its peak; but although his career record against New York was only 25–37, that was still slightly better than the 27–41 mark compiled by National League (NL) championship teams over 11 World Series against the Yankees during the same period.

After joining the San Francisco Giants in 1962, Pierce played a pivotal role in helping them win the NL pennant, going 12–0 in home games and getting a three-hit shutout and a save in a three-game playoff against the Los Angeles Dodgers to clinch the title. His 1,999 career strikeouts were the fifth most by a left-hander when he retired, and his AL total of 1,842 ranked ninth in league history. He also ranked tenth among left-handers in career wins (211), sixth in games started (432) and games pitched (585), eighth in shutouts (38) and ninth in innings pitched (3,306 2/3). He holds the White Sox franchise record for career strikeouts (1,796), and his club marks of 186 wins, 2,931 innings and 390 starts are team records for a left-hander. The White Sox retired his number 19 in 1987, and unveiled a statue in his honor at U.S. Cellular Field in 2007; he was selected to the White Sox All-Century Team in 2000.

== Early baseball career ==
=== Youth baseball ===
Pierce was born in Detroit, Michigan, to pharmacist Walter Pierce and his wife Julia, and grew up in Highland Park. He showed his first interest in baseball at age ten. He recalled: "I refused to have my tonsils removed. My folks offered me a major league baseball and a good glove if I'd have the operation. I took the payola. It really was a thrill to throw around that 'league' ball."

After starting out as a first baseman, he switched to pitching to emulate his hero, Detroit Tigers star Tommy Bridges, who like Pierce had a slight build. He attended Highland Park Community High School, where his teammates included future major league pitcher Ted Gray, and pitched six shutouts as a junior in 1944, earning the nickname "Mr. Zero". He was the starting and winning pitcher in an East-West All-American Boys' Game sponsored by Esquire magazine, held on August 7, 1944, at the Polo Grounds in New York, with Connie Mack managing Pierce's East All-Stars; one reporter wrote, "His fast ball was amazing when one considers that he only weighs 140 pounds. In civilian attire he seemed very slender."

The West team included catcher and future Hall of Fame center fielder Richie Ashburn, who was hitless in two at bats against Pierce. The game was held as a benefit for World War II community memorials, and two days prior to the event the participating players were guests of Babe Ruth on his weekly radio program. Pierce was voted the game's outstanding player, winning a four-year scholarship to the college of his choice. Detroit Free Press sports editor Dale Stafford, who chaperoned him to New York, later told a fellow writer, "I never saw such a clean-living youngster. On our trip to New York for the East-West game, Billy kept a diary. One morning I found it open to this entry: 'Here it is ten o'clock and Mr. Stafford still hasn't gone to bed.'"

Pierce downplayed the experience of pitching in a major league stadium, stating, "I was not nervous at the Polo Grounds, as I've pitched several games in Briggs Stadium back home. I've worked out there with the Tigers, and they, the Red Sox and the Phillies have been interested in me. But my folks and I decided that I'd make up my mind about playing pro ball after I graduated from high school."

After considering studying medicine at the University of Michigan, he signed with his hometown Tigers for a bonus of $15,000.

== Major League Baseball ==
=== Detroit Tigers (1945, 1948) ===
He made the Tigers team in spring training 1945 before finishing high school and without having played in the minor leagues, but sat on the bench before making his major league debut in June 1945, just a few weeks after his 18th birthday. He made three relief appearances that month and two more in September after a two-month stint with the Buffalo Bisons of the International League under manager Bucky Harris, and was on the Detroit roster for the team's victory in the 1945 World Series although he did not appear in any games. He had a remarkably unassuming presence; Paul Richards, then a catcher for the Tigers, later recalled occasionally going to his neighborhood drugstore. One day, Pierce went up to him at practice and asked why Richards never talked to him at the store, with Richards replying that he didn't know what Pierce was talking about; Pierce answered that the drugstore was his family's, and Richards slowly realized that Pierce had been the clerk behind the counter each time he went in.

Pierce was sent back to Buffalo for the 1946 season, now with Gabby Hartnett as his manager (Harris having moved to the team's front office), but missed most of the year with a back injury which was attributed to overwork. After the 1947 season in Buffalo, where Richards was now his manager, he returned to Detroit in 1948, spending most of the season in the bullpen but making five starts and posting a 3–0 record; he had yet added very little weight since his high school days, being still at 148 pounds. He made his first start, and earned his first major league victory, on August 8 against the Washington Senators, pitching 7 2/3 innings and striking out six in a 6–5 victory in which he also drove in a run with a triple and scored. However, Pierce also issued 51 walks in 55 1/3 innings that year, and concerns about his pitching control led the Tigers to trade him to the White Sox on November 10 for catcher Aaron Robinson and $10,000, in what most baseball historians consider to be one of the most one-sided trades in baseball history. Talks had initially centered on Chicago acquiring Pierce's high school teammate Ted Gray, although sources differ as to whether it was White Sox general manager Frank Lane or his Detroit counterpart Billy Evans who switched the focus to Pierce; the Tigers tried to call off the deal one day after it was completed upon fully realizing what they had given up, even offering $50,000 to get Pierce back, but Lane had no intention of giving up the steal he had accomplished in his first trade as general manager.

=== Chicago White Sox (1949–1961) ===
In his first seasons with White Sox, Pierce's control problems continued; his 137 walks in 1950 tied him for the fourth most ever by an AL left-hander. But those seasons also included indications of his developing excellence, as well as the struggles he would face in gaining run support. On May 29, 1949, in just his sixth start with Chicago (and the 11th of his career), the 22-year-old Pierce was matched against 42-year-old Negro league legend Satchel Paige in a road game against the defending World Series champion Cleveland Indians. The pitchers' duel went into the 11th inning, when Pierce walked leadoff hitter Ken Keltner, followed by two bunt singles. After Pierce was replaced by a reliever and the next batter lined to shortstop Luke Appling, Lou Boudreau singled to give Cleveland a 2–1 win; Pierce had himself scored Chicago's only run after singling in the eighth inning. And on June 15, 1950, against the World Series champion Yankees, Pierce got his first career shutout – a 5–0 one-hitter, interrupted by rain delays in the second, fourth and fifth innings totaling over an hour and a half, with the only hit being Billy Johnson's single in the fifth inning.

== Early 1950s ==
=== Development of style ===
Over 13 seasons with the White Sox, Pierce was the ace of the pitching staff, leading the team in wins nine times and in strikeouts eight times. He was Chicago's Opening Day starter seven times (1951–52, 1954, 1956–59), and started the home opener in 1953 and 1961. He had an outstanding fastball and an excellent curveball, and in 1951 added the slider (for which he used his motion for the curve rather than the fastball) as a third strong pitch, as well as a changeup. He worked quickly with an over-the-top motion, dropping his back shoulder in a style similar to that later used by Sandy Koufax. In 1957, Paul Richards noted of Pierce's early style: "He had a tendency to windmill in his delivery, which makes the ball spin too much and takes the life out of it. He flashed his curve-the Yankees always knew when he was throwing a curve. But mainly Bill didn't want to throw anything but fast balls in the old days. He laughed at the change-of-pace and the slider, so most of the strong right-hand hitters were laying back for him, waiting for a fast ball down the middle." After Pierce finally tried the slider against the Yankees, to great effect, Richards noted, "Then, for a while there, he began throwing nothing but sliders. He finally learned about that, too. Even today Pierce will pitch a whole ball game and almost never throw anything but fast balls. But only on certain days." Yankees star Joe DiMaggio was among those praising Pierce's ability, reportedly remarking, "That little so-and-so is a marvel. So little – and all that speed. And I mean speed! He got me out of there on a fastball in the ninth that I'd have needed a telescope to see." Richards became Chicago's manager in 1951, and worked with Pierce to develop his two new pitches and slow down his pace, as well as significantly improve his control; Pierce later recalled, "I learned to control my fastball better [...] Developing the slider helped me tremendously because it gave me a third out pitch. I threw it almost as hard as my fastball, but I could throw it for strikes better than the fast ball or good curve ... Richards made me work on it, and it took me about two years before it was consistent." After issuing 249 walks in 391 innings in 1949–1950, Pierce gave up only 73 walks in 240 innings in 1951, and averaged more than 3 walks per 9 innings in three seasons afterward. His 1951 ERA of 3.03 was fourth best in the league, and he ranked sixth in 1952 with a mark of 2.57. On September 21, 1952, he broke Doc White's 1907 club record of 141 strikeouts by a left-hander, ending the season with 144.

On April 16, 1953, against the St. Louis Browns (the second game of the season, and Chicago's home opener) Pierce pitched his second one-hitter, a 1–0 victory in which he allowed only a seventh-inning double by Bobby Young; the White Sox gained only two singles in the contest, and scored on a walk, sacrifice hit, error and sacrifice fly. Pierce was chosen to start the All-Star Game for the AL – the first White Sox pitcher ever to do so – and allowed only a single by Stan Musial through three innings. Boston Red Sox star Ted Williams recalled of the game: "It was a hot day at Crosley Field and I remember being so concerned for little Billy Pierce of the White Sox. Billy probably threw harder than anybody for a guy his size, he had a real big delivery, nice to look at, and he had overcome a lot. I understand he had had epilepsy, and I was really pulling for him. He was a nervous little guy, and here he was starting his first All-Star game in a bandbox park that's tough to pitch in, and against Robin Roberts to boot. Pierce held them in the palm of his hand that day. He threw the ball right by everybody."

During the early 1950s, Richards preferred to arrange his rotation so that Pierce started only every fifth or sixth day, holding him back against weaker teams but using him more often for big games against the powerful Yankees and Indians. Catcher Sherm Lollar later observed that although it was essentially a compliment to Pierce's ability, he might have picked up more victories and won 20 games sooner in his career had he faced each opponent more equally. With a 1–0 two-hitter at Washington on August 3, in which the White Sox won on an unearned run in the ninth inning with a hit batter, error and sacrifice fly, Pierce began a streak of 39 2/3 consecutive scoreless innings – the longest such streak in the AL between 1926, when Ted Lyons had a 41-inning streak for the White Sox, and 1968; it remains the fifth longest ever by a left-hander, and the longest by an AL southpaw since 1905. The streak ended when he allowed two unearned runs against the Browns in the sixth inning on August 19; two additional earned runs in the tenth inning ended his streak, dating to July 29, of 49 2/3 innings without an earned run, and gave him a 4–3 loss. He led the league in strikeouts (186) and was second in ERA (2.72), and on September 27 started for the White Sox in the final game in Browns history, winning 2–1 in 11 innings at St. Louis. His seven shutouts that season were the second most by an AL left-hander since 1916, matched only by Hal Newhouser's 1945 total of eight.

==== Progress interrupted ====
Pierce's 1954 season was interrupted when he reported pain in his left arm in a May 25 win over Cleveland; after several days of difficulty in determining the problem, he had oral surgery to remove an infected wisdom tooth and adjacent molar on June 3. He did not pitch again until June 20, but a lack of arm strength caused him to be ineffective in that start before slowly coming back with two relief appearances and another poor start, finally picking up wins with consecutive 3–0 shutouts on July 5 and 11, the latter being his fourth career two-hitter. It was later reported that the tooth problem had possibly existed as early as spring training, when Pierce initially suffered arm problems. But although he recorded only nine wins that season, he was one of just four pitchers to defeat the Indians three times as they racked up a league-record 111 victories, after also having been one of four pitchers to defeat the champion Yankees four times in 1953.

Playing the Yankees on June 25, 1953, he was part of a rare defensive shift; leading 4–2 in the ninth inning, he was moved to first base, with Harry Dorish entering in relief. Pinch hitter Don Bollweg barely beat out a bunt single to first base, but Pierce than recorded a putout on Gil McDougald's grounder to third base. He then retook the mound, and after issuing a walk, gained the final two outs to finish the victory; the White Sox set an AL record by using five first basemen in the game. Pierce was also an excellent baserunner, and was used as a pinch runner 30 times between 1949 and 1957 – even scoring as a substitute for three-time stolen base champion Minnie Miñoso in a 5–4 victory over the Yankees on June 22, 1956.

== Late 1950s ==
=== Peak years ===
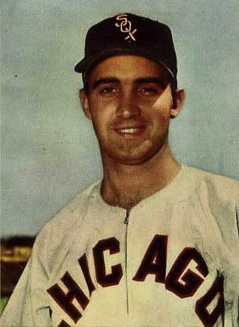
Pierce in 1955.

In 1955 Pierce again started the All-Star Game, going into the All-Star break with a record of just 5–6 in spite of his 2.11 ERA; in his last two starts before the break, he suffered back-to-back 1–0 losses to Early Wynn and Bob Lemon of the Indians. In the All-Star Game he allowed only one baserunner through three innings (a leadoff single by Red Schoendienst, who was thrown out on a steal attempt); he staked the AL to a 4–0 lead, but the National League came back for a 6–5 win in 10 innings after scoring five runs off Whitey Ford in the seventh and eighth innings. Pierce ended the season with the league lead in ERA (although his record was just 15–10), with his mark of 1.97 being the lowest by a major league pitcher between Hal Newhouser in 1946 (1.94) and Sandy Koufax in 1963 (1.88); he led the major leagues by nearly two thirds of a run, with Ford having the next best mark at 2.63. Total Baseball has rated Pierce as the best pitcher in the major leagues in 1955, after having placed him among the AL's top five pitchers each year from 1951 to 1953.

In 1956 he started his third All-Star Game, but was charged with the loss despite allowing only one run in three innings. Buoyed by the arrival of rookie shortstop Luis Aparicio, who sparked the team in leading the league in stolen bases, the White Sox enjoyed a two-month offensive surge from June 4 to August 3 in which they averaged eight runs in Pierce's 13 starts; he won 11 of the games, losing only those immediately before and after the All-Star break, the latter being a 2–1 loss to Ford and the Yankees. He became the first White Sox pitcher since 1941 to win 20 games, was second in the AL with a career-high 192 strikeouts (a team record for left-handers until Gary Peters had 205 in 1964), and was named AL Pitcher of the Year by The Sporting News, outpolling Ford (who had edged him in a close 1955 vote) by a margin of 117 to 52; he also finished fifth in voting for the AL Most Valuable Player Award. In 1957 Pierce became the first White Sox pitcher since Red Faber (1920–1922) to earn 20 victories in consecutive seasons; he tied Jim Bunning for the league lead, and bested him in voting for AL Pitcher of the Year. He had six consecutive complete game victories from May 16 to June 8 in which his total ERA was 0.64, with two 1–0 victories in ten innings including his sixth career two-hitter on June 4 against the Red Sox; the White Sox scored just nine total runs over the last five games in that stretch. Despite the presence of such popular players as Miñoso, Aparicio and second baseman Nellie Fox, Pierce was chosen as the player most popular with White Sox fans in a 1957 spring training poll of sportswriters. A separate poll of managers, coaches, writers and broadcasters named him Chicago's best fielding pitcher, best pitcher at holding runners to first base, and best pitcher for crucial games, as well as the team's most nervous player on the field.

==== End of peak ====
In 1958 he was second in the league in both wins (17) and ERA (2.68); his seventh two-hitter, a 1–0 win on June 21 against the Baltimore Orioles in which the White Sox scored only an unearned run in the first inning, was followed by the greatest game of his career. On June 27 against the Senators, he retired the first 26 batters before pinch hitter Ed Fitz Gerald lined Pierce's first pitch down the first base line for an opposite-field double that landed about a foot from the foul line. Pierce then struck out Albie Pearson on three pitches to end the game; only twice did he go to a three-ball count. The lone hit marred what would have been a remarkable accomplishment; not only had no left-hander pitched a perfect game since Lee Richmond in 1880, but only one AL left-hander (Mel Parnell in 1956) pitched even a no-hitter between 1931 and 1962. Although disappointed by the near miss, Pierce praised his teammates for their defensive work, saying, "Give Luis plenty of credit. And Sherm really mixed 'em up beautifully. The big thing is that we won." At a Capitol lunch with several White Sox players during the following year's pennant race, Vice President Richard Nixon told Pierce that he had watched the game on television, saying, "I'm a Washington fan, but that was one night I was rooting for the White Sox." In a 1982 interview, Pierce said, "The book on Fitz Gerald was that he was a fastball hitter on the first ball and liked it inside where he could pull it. So we threw him a curve away and he hit into right for a solid hit. I didn't feel that badly about it, really. It didn't mean that much at the moment. But now ... well, now I wish I had got it. It would have been nice." His streak of 33 consecutive scoreless innings was ended with an unearned run in the seventh inning on July 1.

Pierce tied for the league lead in complete games each year from 1956 to 1958, and was again selected for the All-Star team each year from 1957 to 1959 and again in 1961, although he only appeared in the 1957 game in which he retired his first five batters before allowing three runs. On June 11, 1959, he pitched his fourth and final one-hitter, a 3–1 victory at Washington in which he allowed only a third-inning double by Ron Samford, who scored after three two-out walks, the last to Harmon Killebrew; the White Sox won on a two-run double in the ninth inning by Jim Landis off Senators starter Camilo Pascual. Pierce had the longest outing of his career on August 6 in a road game against the Orioles, pitching 16 innings in a contest that ended in a 1–1 tie after 18 frames; it proved to be the last time in his career that he pitched into extra innings. After losing his next two starts, pulling a back muscle and straining the ligaments in his right hip against the Kansas City Athletics in the third inning on August 15, he was out of action until a 2–1 win over Kansas City on September 7.

Manager Al López' decision not to start Pierce in the 1959 World Series against the Los Angeles Dodgers was highly controversial. After Cy Young Award winner Early Wynn started for Chicago in Game 1, Lopez chose to start Bob Shaw (18–6 in the regular season) and Dick Donovan (9–10) in the next two contests, which the White Sox lost by scores of 4–3 and 3–1. Pierce was held back until Game 4, and relieved in each of the final three games of the Series, allowing only two hits and no runs in four innings of work. In Game 4 he entered in the fourth inning with Chicago trailing 4–0, and pitched a hitless three innings before being pulled for a pinch hitter in the seventh inning, when the Sox tied the game; the Dodgers went on to win 5–4. In Game 5 he entered in the eighth inning to protect a 1–0 lead, but only issued an intentional walk before Lopez again changed pitchers; the White Sox held on for the 1–0 win. Lopez even chose to start Wynn in Game 6 on two days' rest, but he was ineffective, and Chicago was behind 8–3 by the time Pierce was brought in to start the eighth inning; the Dodgers later added a run in the ninth inning to complete the 9–3 win and capture the Series championship. Being used out of the bullpen was a deep letdown for Pierce, who said in a 1982 interview, "Other guys, Early Wynn and Bob Shaw, had better years than I did that year. And against the left-handed-heavy lineup the Dodgers threw at us, Al wanted his right-handers like Dick Donovan. There was no question I was disappointed, but I understood." However, there have been suggestions that Lopez' decision had other, undisclosed motivations; noting his surprise that Lopez chose to use Pierce out of the bullpen, outfielder Al Smith recalled, "We all knew why Al López didn't pitch him, but we never told anyone and I won't say now. I will say that I thought he should have pitched. He'd been pitching all year, hadn't he?"

== Offensive support ==
Although they never finished below third place from 1952 through 1960, the "Go-Go White Sox" were a team which thrived on speed, defense and pitching rather than hitting, and Pierce struggled for offensive support throughout his time with the club. Both Richards and Lopez – who became Chicago's manager in 1957 – placed a low emphasis on offense, with Lopez expressing his philosophy that "all a team really needed was pitching and defense, because if you didn't allow the other team to score, eventually they would give you a run, and you'd win the game." Nellie Fox, who was also Pierce's roommate, turned to him on one occasion when the White Sox picked up a run following a scoring drought and said, "Here's your run. Now go out there and hold it." Although AL teams averaged 4.46 runs per game from 1949 through 1961, and the White Sox averaged 4.53 runs in games started by their other pitchers, they averaged only 4.20 runs in Pierce's starts – a figure which drops to 4.07 if the two-month scoring outburst in 1956 is discounted; in over two thirds of his losses with Chicago (105 of 152), and fully one third of his starts (130 of 390), they scored two or fewer runs. They averaged 3.7 runs in his 1953 starts, and 3.6 runs in his 1955 starts; even in 1959, when the pennant-winning White Sox averaged 4.29 runs per game, they averaged only 3.36 runs in Pierce's starts. By 1955 it was regularly noted that Chicago's offensive struggles were placing undue pressure on the pitching staff, wearing them out with "one tense game after another, never having a comfortable margin that might permit a little breather now and then"; Pierce was described as "the unluckiest pitcher in the majors" that year due to the lack of scoring. But in contrast, when he had a reasonable level of offensive backing he was far more successful, posting a record of 30–11 when Chicago scored four runs and 99–10 when they scored five or more; from September 1951 through May 1958, he was 71–6 when they scored at least four runs and 55–1 when they scored at least five.

== Yankees rivalry ==
Pierce played a major role in keeping the White Sox competitive with the powerhouse Yankees through most of the 1950s, and after a rough period from June 1951 to July 1952 in which he dropped 10 of 11 decisions to New York (despite a respectable 3.69 ERA in those games), he held his own against the Yankees, posting a record of 21–21 from August 1952 through the 1960 season. Ironically, the turnaround in his fortunes against the Yankees followed one of Chicago's most crushing defeats to their rivals; on July 29, 1952, he left with a 7–3 lead and one out in the eighth inning, only to see the Yankees come back against the White Sox bullpen to win 10–7 on Mickey Mantle's grand slam in the ninth. Years later, Pierce still recalled the game as being one of his most frustrating outings. He faced Whitey Ford 15 times in his career (more than against any other pitcher), including a 1–0 loss on May 17, 1955, a 3–2 loss in 10 innings on June 5 later that year, a 2–1 loss on July 15, 1956, a 3–2 loss in 11 innings on September 18 of that year (in which the Yankees clinched the pennant on Mantle's 50th home run in the final frame), a 3–1 win on May 21, 1957, and a 4–3 win in 11 innings on April 30, 1959.

By the 1957 season, Shirley Povich of The Washington Post expressed a clear preference for Pierce over Ford, writing that anyone doubting Pierce's place as the league's top left-hander was "risking committal as an incurable psycho who can neither read the figures nor respond to reason." Pierce's 4–3 win over the Yankees on July 28, 1959, put the White Sox in first place, where they stayed for the remainder of the season to take their first pennant in 40 years; it was his 160th victory with Chicago, breaking Doc White's team record for wins by a left-hander (he broke White's club records for career games and innings by a left-hander the same year). In late 1958, sportswriter Edgar Munzel wrote, "The primary difference between Pierce and Ford, in their long-standing duel for southpaw supremacy in the American League, is that Pierce is pitching for a woefully weak hitting team, while Ford is backed by the league's most powerful offensive machine... An even greater boon to Whitey is the fact that he doesn't have to face the Yankees." Of Pierce, who he described as the top White Sox pitcher for the past decade, he added, "Normally, he's lucky if he's supported with as many as two runs when he faces the Yankees."

Yankee outfielder Bob Cerv recalled of the rivalry, "I always remember the games when Pierce and Ford would lock up. Those were great ballgames – 2–1, 3–2. Usually, if they'd get beat, Mantle would hit a home run." New York outfielder Hank Bauer noted, "The guy who gave me the most problem – I know he gave 'em to me, and I think he gave 'em to most of us – was Billy Pierce." Tommy Byrne, who pitched for the Yankees for most of his career from 1943 to 1957 but played for Chicago for the first half of the 1953 season, said, "Pierce was sneaky fast, a good breaking ball. He was tough. For several years there he was right up there on a par with Ford." Sportswriter Bill Madden recalled in 1982, "Always it was Pierce against Whitey Ford and always, to me, that seemed like an unfair matchup. They were your classic 'stylish' left-handers, equal in guile and guts, but Ford had those howitzers of Mickey Mantle, Yogi Berra, Bill Skowron and Hank Bauer behind him, while Pierce came armed with popguns. Nellie Fox, Luis Aparicio and Minnie Miñoso supported him with hustle and chink singles and I always marveled at the fact that Pierce could duel Ford on even terms despite those odds." Ironically, the Yankees tried to acquire Pierce in the early 1950s when Ford was in the military, but White Sox general manager Frank Lane proposed that New York give up Bauer, first baseman Joe Collins and second baseman Jerry Coleman in exchange for Pierce and outfielder Al Zarilla, and ended talks when Yankees GM George Weiss suggested the Yankees send minor leaguers instead.

== Later career ==
In his last two seasons with Chicago, Pierce posted records of just 14–7 and 10–9, but a shaky bullpen contributed to his middling record; although he left the game with a lead in the sixth inning or later 15 times in those seasons, White Sox relievers failed to protect that lead seven times. Indeed, Pierce was seen to be the team's only consistently effective starter in 1960, picking up eight complete-game victories by mid-August. On June 20, 1961, Pierce broke Ed Walsh's White Sox record of 1,732 career strikeouts.

=== San Francisco Giants (1962–1964) ===
On November 30, 1961, he was traded to the San Francisco Giants along with Don Larsen in exchange for four players (three of them pitchers) who had spent most or all of 1961 in the minor leagues. Giants manager Alvin Dark declared his intent to use Pierce as the ace of a young pitching staff that included developing talents such as Juan Marichal, Gaylord Perry and Mike McCormick. Unlike the White Sox, the Giants featured a powerful offense which included Willie Mays, Willie McCovey and Orlando Cepeda, and Pierce took advantage of the improved run support with his new team, winning his first eight starts before suffering a 4–3 loss on June 7. His first start on April 13 was a deeply rewarding one, after a rough spring training in which he recorded a 16.45 ERA. Facing the Cincinnati Reds, he retired the first 13 batters and allowed only two hits in 7 1/3 innings. The crowd of 23,755 gave him a roaring ovation, and he later said, "The cheers really got to me inside. Fans nowhere could have been more wonderful. I felt it way down deep."

The Giants were credited with pulling off the best deal of the year, with Larsen and Pierce – "the little southpaw chatterbox" – leading the team to the best record in the major leagues through early June. In a road game against the Reds on June 14, he allowed a leadoff double to Vada Pinson, but was then accidentally spiked in the left ankle while covering first base on a groundout by Don Blasingame, an injury which required 14 stitches. Pulled from the game after just 1/3 of an inning, he took the loss when Pinson later scored and the Giants were shut out 8–0. The injury likely cost him what would have been his eighth All-Star selection, and he did not return to the field until he lasted only three innings in a loss on July 15; he then made three relief appearances before picking up a win on August 2. But over the course of the year he proved to be a pitcher who thrived in blustery Candlestick Park, winning all 11 of his home starts as the Giants tied the Dodgers for the NL pennant with a record of 101–61, forcing a three-game playoff. Against the Dodgers on August 11 he earned his 200th career victory, with McCovey's three-run home run off eventual Cy Young winner Don Drysdale giving the Giants a 5–4 win and ending Drysdale's 11-game win streak.

Pierce started the first game of the playoff against the Dodgers on October 1, opposing Sandy Koufax, and pushed his Candlestick record to 12–0 with a three-hit 8–0 victory in which only two Dodgers reached second base; he described it as "the most satisfying game I ever pitched." Former NL umpire Babe Pinelli, watching from the press box, remarked, "Look at him fire that fast one! He's been in so many clutch games that they're nothing to him!" After the Dodgers tied the series in Game 2, he came back in Game 3 on October 3 to pitch the ninth inning with a 6–4 lead, and retired all three batters he faced to clinch the Giants' first pennant in San Francisco, being mobbed by his teammates upon the final out. Against the Yankees in the World Series, he started Game 3, and went into the bottom of the seventh inning with no score; but he allowed three runs in the seventh inning (one of them unearned after two outfield errors), and took the 3–2 loss. He came back with another brilliant outing in Game 6 at Candlestick Park against Whitey Ford, not allowing a baserunner until the fifth inning and finishing with a three-hit 5–2 victory to tie the Series at three games each; he only allowed three runners to reach second base, and only went to a three-ball count four times. Although his two Series appearances both came after his peak years were behind him, Pierce posted a career Series ERA of 1.89 in 19 innings.

==== Last seasons ====
Given his brilliance in home games in 1962, it was no surprise that Pierce was chosen to start the Giants' home opener in 1963, and he responded with the last shutout of his career – a 7–0 win over the Houston Colt .45s. He achieved his Candlestick success despite often discarding one of his primary pitches, the low curve, saying, "How many left-handers come into this park and win with that pitch on a windy afternoon?" He instead altered the location of his pitches, throwing outside to left-handers to get them to hit to left field, taking advantage of the wind which kept the ball in the air longer; two-time AL batting champion Pete Runnels observed that Pierce pitched to him completely differently upon changing leagues. His home win streak ended in his next start on April 20, a 4–0 loss to the Chicago Cubs; he gradually moved to the bullpen over the course of the 1963 season, and was used almost exclusively in relief in 1964. On September 10, 1964, against the Dodgers, in what was later called "Billy the Kid's last fight," he made his first start in over a year and the last of his career, pitching 7 2/3 innings and gaining a 5–1 win. He made one more appearance in relief on October 3, falling one strikeout short of 2,000, and announced his retirement the next day as the season came to an end. In an 18-season career, Pierce posted a 211–169 record with a 3.27 ERA in 3,306 2/3 innings; only twice (1948 and 1963) did he post an ERA of 4.00 or higher, and never in a season of at least 100 innings. He completed 193 of his 432 starts, including 38 shutouts, and also had 33 saves among his 585 total games pitched. His 186 career victories with the White Sox rank fourth on the club's all-time list, behind Hall of Famers Ted Lyons, Red Faber and Ed Walsh. His White Sox record of 456 career games by a left-hander was broken by Wilbur Wood in 1974.

Listed at 5 ft 10 in (1.78 m) and 160 lb (73 kg), Pierce was also among the more diminutive pitchers to enjoy great success, and is likely the smallest pitcher since the 1920s to win 200 games. Sherm Lollar, his catcher for ten years in Chicago, noted that his lack of size didn't diminish his velocity, noting, "He isn't too big, but he has wonderful coordination. And he sure is pretty to watch, the way he pumps and rocks and throws. Sometimes, when I'm not catching a game, I'll just go off to one side and watch him pitch." And Paul Richards noted, "Pierce is a perfectionist who has achieved maximum potential out of the equipment nature gave him." Pierce's size also belied his durability, as he was one of the few pitchers under 6 feet (1.8 m) in height to lead the league in complete games since the 1920s, with Ned Garver, Frank Lary, Camilo Pascual and Fernando Valenzuela – all of whom were an inch taller and outweighed Pierce by at least 20 pounds – being the only other pitchers under six feet tall to lead the league more than once since the early 1930s. He remains the last pitcher to lead the AL in complete games three years in a row.

== MLB stats, awards, and achievements ==
=== Stats ===
Years	Games	W	L	PCT	ERA	CG	SHO	SV	IP	H	R	ER	HR	BB	SO	HBP	BK	WP	Fld%
18	585	211	169	.555	3.27	193	38	33	3306.2	2989	1325	1201	284	1178	1999	30	10	48	.956

=== Awards ===
- All-Star: 1953, 1955, 1956, 1957, 1958, 1959, 1961

=== Achievements ===
- American League leader in ERA (1955)
- American League leader in wins (1957)
- American League leader in complete games (1956–1958)
- American League leader in strikeouts (1953)
- American League leader in strikeouts per 9 innings pitched (1953–1954)
- American League leader in fielding average as pitcher (1956)
- American League pennant team (1945, 1959)
- National League pennant team (1962)
- World Series champion team (1945)
- 20-game wins (2)
- One-hitter (4)
- Two-hitter (7)
- Chicago White Sox All-Century Team (2000)

== Retirement ==
Billy Pierce's number 19 was retired by the Chicago White Sox in 1987.

Through the 1950s, Pierce generally spent the offseason helping his father run the family's Detroit pharmacy. He did not pursue a coaching career, even though a 1963 spring training poll of sportswriters had named him the top managerial prospect on the Giants. After leaving baseball, he was a White Sox television color analyst in 1970, briefly a partner in Oldsmobile and Cadillac dealerships, a stockbroker, then worked as a sales and public relations representative for the Continental Envelope company from 1974 until retiring in 1997. He also worked as a White Sox scout, discovering 1983 Rookie of the Year Ron Kittle. The White Sox retired his number 19 in 1987; he is one of only eight players so honored. He was named to the Sox Team of the Century in 2000, and was inducted into the Michigan Sports Hall of Fame in 2003. On October 4, 2005, Pierce threw out the first pitch before Game 1 of the AL Division Series against the Red Sox (a 14–2 win), as the White Sox began the postseason which culminated in the 2005 World Series title – their first championship in 88 years. In 2006, he was inducted into the Chicagoland Sports Hall of Fame.

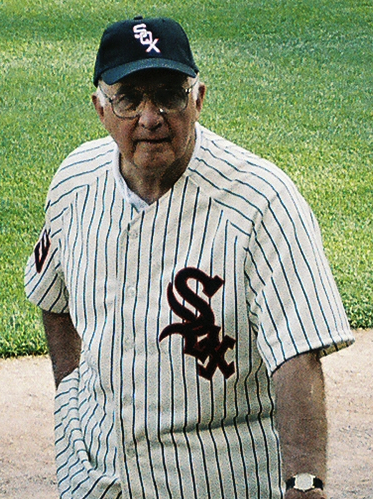
Pierce at U.S. Cellular Field in 2005

On July 23, 2007, the White Sox unveiled a statue in Pierce's honor in the center field concourse of U.S. Cellular Field, joining likenesses of Charles Comiskey, Minnie Miñoso, Carlton Fisk, Luis Aparicio and Nellie Fox. Sculptors had borrowed photographs and measured his face, leading him to comment, "I don't know why; it isn't the same measurement it was in the '50s." Adding that he hoped statues of Hall of Fame shortstop Luke Appling and pitcher Ted Lyons – both stars of the 1930s and 1940s – might be added in the future, he nonetheless admitted his excitement over the honor, saying, "I think of it more, in times to come, when my grandkids go out to the park, they'll see it. It's going to be there for years." The book "Then Ozzie Said to Harold...": The Best Chicago White Sox Stories Ever Told, coauthored by Pierce, was published in March 2008.

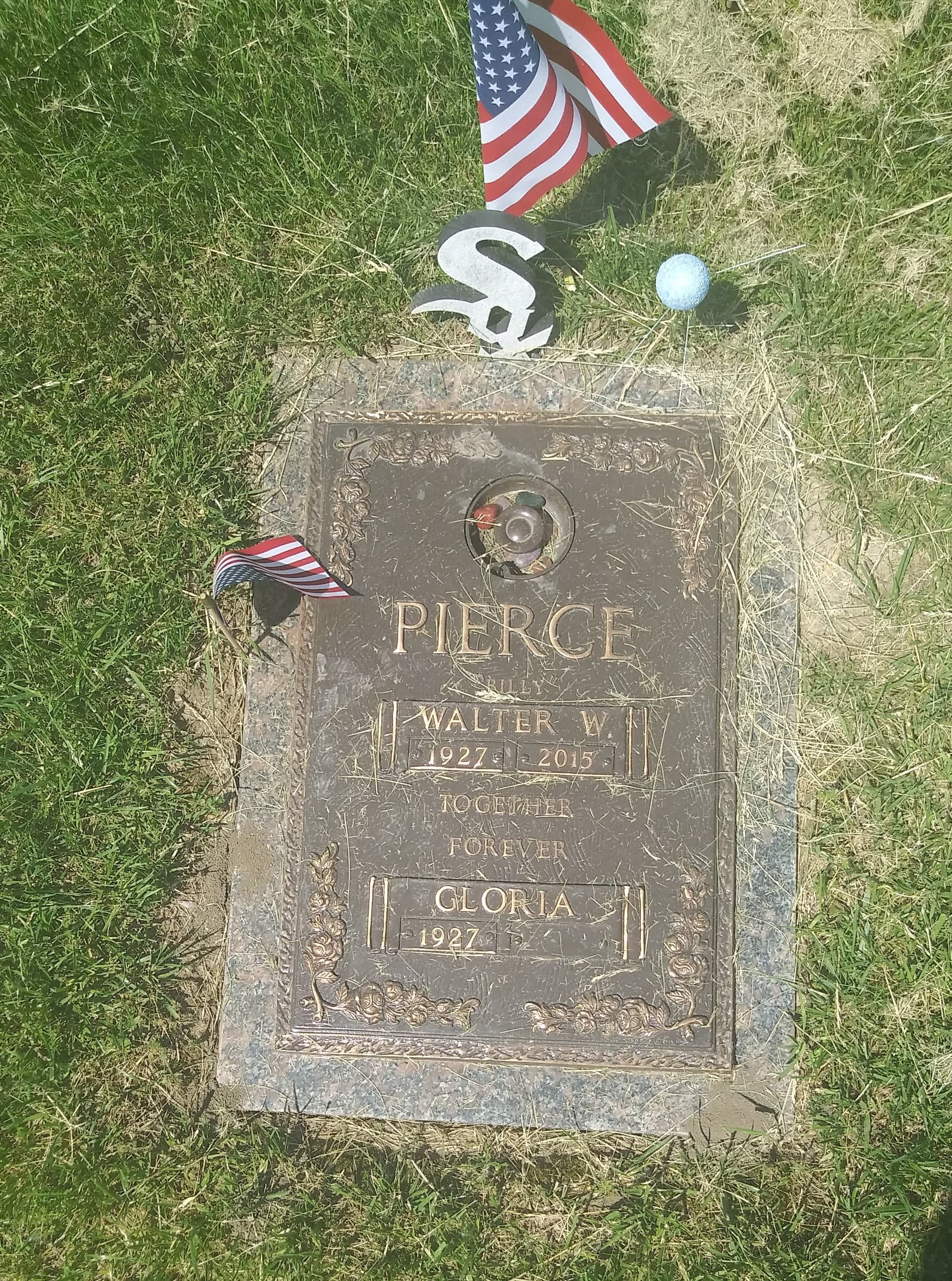
Billy Pierce Gravesite located at Chapel Hill Gardens South Funeral Home and Cemetery in Oak Lawn, Illinois

Pierce married Gloria McCreadie, who he had dated since high school, on October 22, 1949, and they have three children, William Reed (born July 6, 1953), Patricia "Patti" Crowley (born October 4, 1955) and Robert Walter (born July 16, 1958). Pierce told one interviewer of his wife, "She's not only a loyal fan, but a smart one, and there was the day I had to go to Marty Marion – he was the White Sox manager then – and tell him that he'd better change our bunt sign because Gloria had stolen it, so very likely the opposition would be stealing it too." Although he had by then been traded to the Giants, following the 1962 season they relocated from Birmingham, Michigan, to the southwest Chicago suburb of Evergreen Park. (For several years while he was with the White Sox, they had also maintained a summer residence in the south side's landmark Flamingo-on-the-Lake Apartments, where teammate Jim Rivera and his family also lived.) He remained a member of the White Sox community relations department into his late 80s, making frequent public appearances in the Chicago area. In addition, beginning in 1993 he headed the not-for-profit Chicago Baseball Cancer Charities, a cause he began supporting after Nellie Fox's death in 1975 at age 47. On June 29, 2013, the White Sox gave out souvenir statuettes of Pierce to fans at that day's game against the Cleveland Indians, and he threw out the ceremonial first pitch.

Pierce died in Palos Heights, Illinois, on July 31, 2015, at the age of 88 from gallbladder cancer. Pierce was a 33rd Degree Scottish Rite Mason of Evergreen Park Lodge; his funeral was held at Evergreen Park Presbyterian Church, and he was entombed in Chapel Hill Gardens South Cemetery in Oak Lawn, Illinois.

== Hall of Fame candidacy ==
Pierce has not been elected to the National Baseball Hall of Fame (as of 2024). In the five years he was on the Baseball Writers' Association of America ballot (1970–1974), Pierce never drew more than 1.9% of the votes cast. However, in October 2014 he was selected for the first time by the BBWAA's overview committee to be one of ten candidates on the Golden Era Committee ballot for possible induction in 2015. He and the other candidates, including former White Sox teammate Minnie Miñoso, all fell short of selection. On November 5, 2021, he was selected to the final ballot for the National Baseball Hall of Fame's Golden Days Era ballot for consideration for the Class of 2022, but received three votes or less of the necessary twelve votes.

== See also ==
- List of Major League Baseball career strikeout leaders
- List of Major League Baseball career wins leaders
- List of Major League Baseball annual wins leaders
- List of Major League Baseball annual ERA leaders
- List of Major League Baseball annual strikeout leaders
