= Squiff =

Squiff is a nickname. Notable people with the nickname include:

- H. H. Asquith (1852–1928), Prime Minister of the United Kingdom
- Herbert Greenwald (1915–1959), American real estate developer in Chicago

== See also ==
- "Squiff", real name Sampson Quincy Iffley Field, a fictional character and pupil at Greyfriars School
