= Morris Greenwald House =

Historic house in Weston, Connecticut

- Morris and Rose Greenwald House
- U.S. National Register of Historic Places
- Location within Connecticut Location within the United States
- Location: Fairfield County, Connecticut
- Nearest city: Weston, Connecticut
- Coordinates: 41°11′51.9″N 73°21′25.9″W
- Built: 1955
- Architect: Ludwig Mies van der Rohe
- Architectural style: International Style
- NRHP reference No.: 100010953
- Designated NRHP: October 28, 2024

The Morris and Rose Greenwald House (also known as the Morris Greenwald House) is a historic house in Weston, Connecticut, US, designed and built in 1955 by German architect Ludwig Mies van der Rohe. The house was constructed as a single-story primary residence in Weston, roughly 45 miles (72 km) northeast of New York City. Morris Greenwald commissioned the brick, steel, and glass residence for himself and his wife. Since 1987, it has been owned by Richard and Jane Wolf.

The structure created by Mies is a late rendition of the International Style, and is recognized internationally as a strong example of "less is more", a common phrase Mies stood by in all of his design choices throughout his career. On October 28, 2024, the house was entered into the National Register of Historic Places by the National Park Service. Since its completion, the house, being one of the only 3 residences built by Mies in the United States, is the only one to remain a private residence.

== History ==
Ludwig Mies van der Rohe was introduced to Morris Greenwald through his brother, Herbert Greenwald, who was a client of Mies from 1946 until Greenwald's untimely death in 1959. The house was completed in 1955 and was the residence of Morris and Rose Greenwald for roughly 25 years.

In 1960, the house was extended by Mies, who added two additional bays and a detached 2 bay garage. This would be the last time that Ludwig Mies van der Rohe was involved with any additions to the Morris Greenwald House.

=== New owners ===
In the early 1980s, Morris and Rose Greenwald put the house up for sale, and in 1981, it was sold to Warren Haber. In 1982, Peter L. Gluck & Partners was hired to design a pavilion, a guest house, and a pool. In 1987, the plan was changed from its original orientation into an L-shaped structure, which included a master bedroom, bathroom, and study, and the interior of the original structure was partially reconfigured. Each of these renovations aimed at staying true to what Mies had built, only extending upon the structure to accommodate the requests of Richard and Jane Wolf.

== Architecture ==
=== Exterior ===
The plans made by Ludwig Mies van der Rohe are a common yet strong example of his "skin and bones" approach to designing structures. The building itself was originally designed as a simple living quarters, only featuring a master bedroom, kitchen, dining area, bathroom, and a few closets for storage. The building itself is primarily made of brick, steel, and glass. Similar to other works of Mies, structural components are steel I-beams to accommodate for the lack of walls, allowing for the extensive use of glass walls and curtain walls where needed for privacy. The house avoids excessive ornamentation, furthering Mies' "less is more" philosophy, and is a strong example of Mies' use of the International style for residential projects.

=== Interior ===
The interior of the residence has strong correlations with the exterior, avoiding ornamentation and using glass to strengthen the relationship between the indoors and nature. As commonly seen in Mies' residences, privacy is scarce, with nature being the only barrier between the public and the home itself. The home has a very open plan, providing for lots of movement and changes.

The 1987 renovations of the residence saw the addition of a master bedroom and bath, a study, and reconfiguration of the kitchen and dining space. Peter L. Gluck and Partners did not change the openness of the floor plan, which was a staple of Mies' residential designs.

== A Weston home ==
Ludwig Mies van der Rohe, having designed residences throughout his entire career, had only designed and constructed 3 residential projects within the United States, one of which was the Morris Greenwald House. The other two, the Farnsworth House in Plano, Illinois, and the Robert H. McCormick House in Elmhurst, Illinois, have been altered into museums to showcase the legacy of Mies and his impact on American architecture. Not only does this make the Morris Greenwald House the only residence on the East Coast, and the last remaining Mies house that is still occupied as a private residence, not open to the public.

== See also ==
- National Register of Historic Places listings in Fairfield County, Connecticut
- Barcelona Pavilion
- 860–880 Lake Shore Drive Apartments
- S. R. Crown Hall
