= 860–880 Lake Shore Drive =

Residential buildings in Chicago, Illinois

- Buildings at 860–880 Lake Shore Drive
- U.S. National Register of Historic Places
- Chicago Landmark
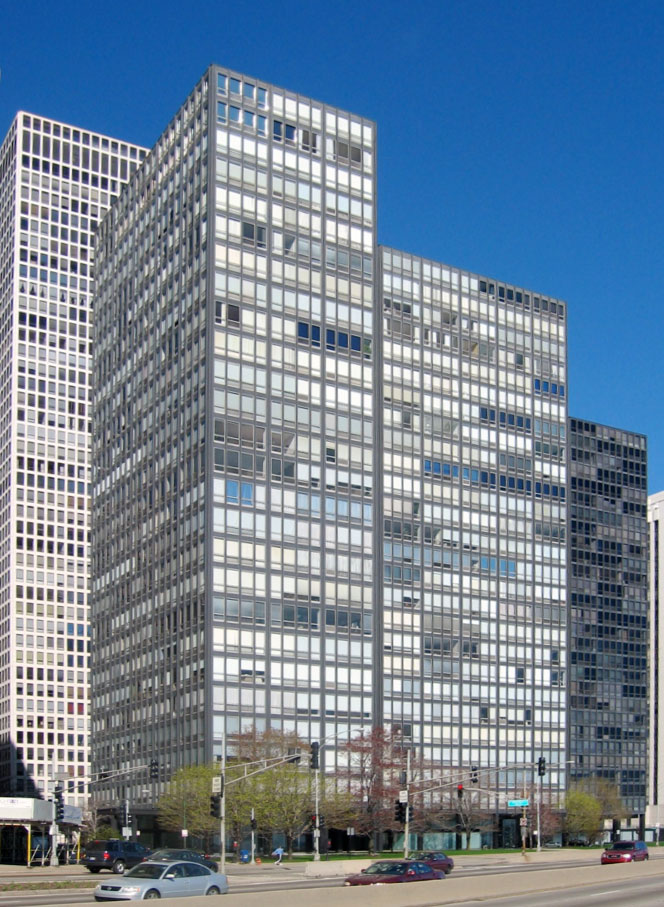

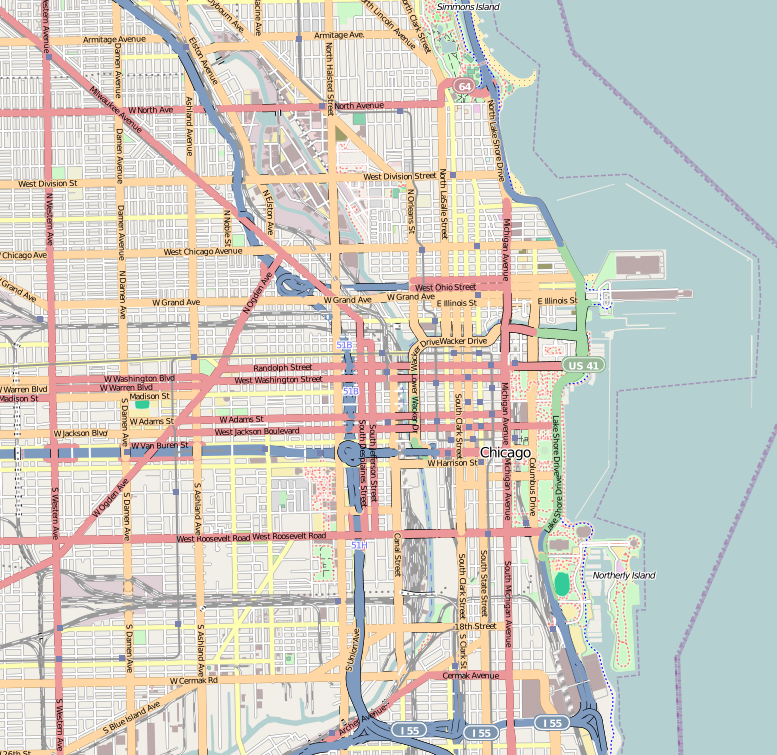
- Location within Central Chicago Location within Illinois Location within the United States
- Location: 860–880 N. Lake Shore Drive, Chicago, Illinois, US
- Coordinates: 41°53′55″N 87°37′7″W
- Area: 1.17 acres (0.47 ha)
- Built: 1949–1952
- Architect: Ludwig Mies van der Rohe
- Architectural style: International Style
- NRHP reference No.: 80001344

Significant dates
- Added to NRHP: August 28, 1980
- Designated CHICL: June 10, 1996

860–880 Lake Shore Drive (officially 860–880 North Lake Shore Drive (Note: Although the official address is on North Lake Shore Drive, the cardinal direction is omitted by numerous sources.)) are a pair of glass-and-steel apartment towers along Lake Shore Drive in Chicago, Illinois, United States. Located in the Streeterville neighborhood, within the Near North Side community area, the buildings were designed in the International Style by Ludwig Mies van der Rohe and were his first high-rise design. Holsman, Holsman, Klekamp & Taylor and Pace Associates were also involved with the design as the associated architects. Each of the towers is identical in shape and materials, measuring 270 feet (82 m) tall with 26 stories. The buildings are listed on the National Register of Historic Places and are designated as a Chicago Landmark.

The two buildings occupy rectangular footprints, being arranged on a 3-by-5 grid of square bays, each measuring 21 feet (6.4 m) on each side. The south tower at 860 North Lake Shore Drive is oriented west–east, while the north tower at 880 North Lake Shore Drive is oriented north–south. There is an arcade at the ground (first) story of both buildings, as well as glass walls around each building's lobbies. On and above the second story of both buildings, the windows are separated vertically by mullion bars with I-beams, and they are divided horizontally by spandrel panels. Each bay has four window panes per story, while different bays are separated vertically by steel plates. Both buildings have a steel superstructure encased in concrete, as well as a structural core for elevators, stairs, hallways, bathrooms, and kitchens. The basement has a garage, and each building's ground story has a lobby. On the upper floors, there were originally a combined 116 six-bedroom apartments and 152 three-and-a-half-room apartments. Many original design elements remain intact, though the apartments have been rearranged over the years.

The real estate developer Herbert Greenwald became acquainted with Mies in 1946, hiring the architect to design the Promontory Apartments on Lake Shore Drive. The design of 860–880 Lake Shore Drive is derived from an alternative design for the Promontory Apartments with a glass-and-steel facade. Greenwald and Robert Hall McCormick announced in April 1949 that they would build two 25-story cooperative apartment towers at 860–880 Lake Shore Drive. A formal groundbreaking ceremony took place on December 17, 1949, and almost all the apartments had been sold by mid-1951. Residents moved in even before the buildings were formally completed in August 1952. The lobbies and their plaza were restored starting in 2008. Despite initial controversy over their unconventional style, which was shared by few buildings in the United States, the 860–880 Lake Shore Drive towers were highly regarded after they were completed. After the towers were finished, many glass-box skyscrapers were built worldwide.

== Site ==
The buildings are located at 860 and 880 North Lake Shore Drive, in the Streeterville neighborhood of the Near North Side of Chicago, Illinois, United States. The complex spans 1.17 acres (0.47 hectares), and has a frontage of 103 feet (31 m) on Delaware Place to the north, 242 feet (74 m) on Lake Shore Drive to the east, and 206 feet (63 m) on Chestnut Street to the south. It faces Lake Michigan immediately to the east. While Delaware Place and Chestnut Street are aligned with Chicago's street grid, Lake Shore Drive runs at a slight angle from northwest to southeast, following the shoreline of Lake Michigan.

The buildings are slightly north of the Chicago Loop and east of Michigan Avenue. The apartment towers at 900–910 North Lake Shore are immediately to the north. Prior to the buildings' completion, the site had been occupied by a mansion belonging to Edith Rockefeller McCormick. By 1949 (just before the site was developed), the McCormick family's McCormick Management Corporation owned the northern half of the site, while Northwestern University had obtained the southern half in 1944 from Robert R. McCormick.

== Architecture ==
The towers at 860–880 Lake Shore Drive were designed by the modernist architect Ludwig Mies van der Rohe for the developer Herbert Greenwald. Holsman, Holsman, Klekamp & Taylor were the consulting architects, and Pace Associates were the associated architects. In addition, Frank J. Kornacher was the engineer, and Richard Kelly the lighting designer. Both towers are 26 stories high, with a height of 270 feet (82 m), and are designed in the International Style. They are the first high-rise buildings Mies designed.

860–880 Lake Shore Drive were part of a trend of glassy skyscrapers in major American cities, other examples of which included the United Nations Secretariat Building in New York City. The writer Franz Schulze described earlier International-style designs, such as the PSFS Building in Philadelphia and 330 West 42nd Street in New York, as "precedents" to the Lake Shore Drive towers' design. 860–880 Lake Shore Drive's relatively simple designs contrast significantly with Mies's earlier designs such as the German Pavilion in Barcelona or the Villa Tugendhat in Brno, which used materials like travertine and marble. Mies, who had a reputation as a minimalist architect, adhered to the principle "less is more", as demonstrated in his self-proclaimed "skin and bones" designs. In designing the buildings, he purposely disregarded the effects of sunlight exposure and wind gusts. The towers' identical appearance, vertical mullions, and the use of a steel frame for articulation set them apart from other buildings of the time, even though none of the actual superstructures are visible on the buildings' facades.

=== Form and facade ===
The two buildings have rectangular footprints and are arranged on perpendicular axes to each other. Their superstructures are constructed on a grid of square bays measuring 21 feet (6.4 m) on each side. The longer sides of each building are five bays wide, while the shorter sides are three bays wide. Unlike older apartment buildings on Lake Shore Drive, which tended to be perpendicular to that street, 860–880 Lake Shore Drive was built perpendicularly to the side streets and the Chicago street grid. 860 North Lake Shore Drive (the south tower) occupies the southeastern corner of the site, with its shorter sides oriented eastward and westward, while 880 North Lake Shore Drive (the north tower) is at the northeastern corner, with its shorter sides oriented northward and southward. The offset positioning maximizes the number of apartments that oversee the lake. Blair Kamin of the Chicago Tribune wrote that, from above, the positioning of the towers made it seem like they were "sliding past each other".

==== Lower stories ====
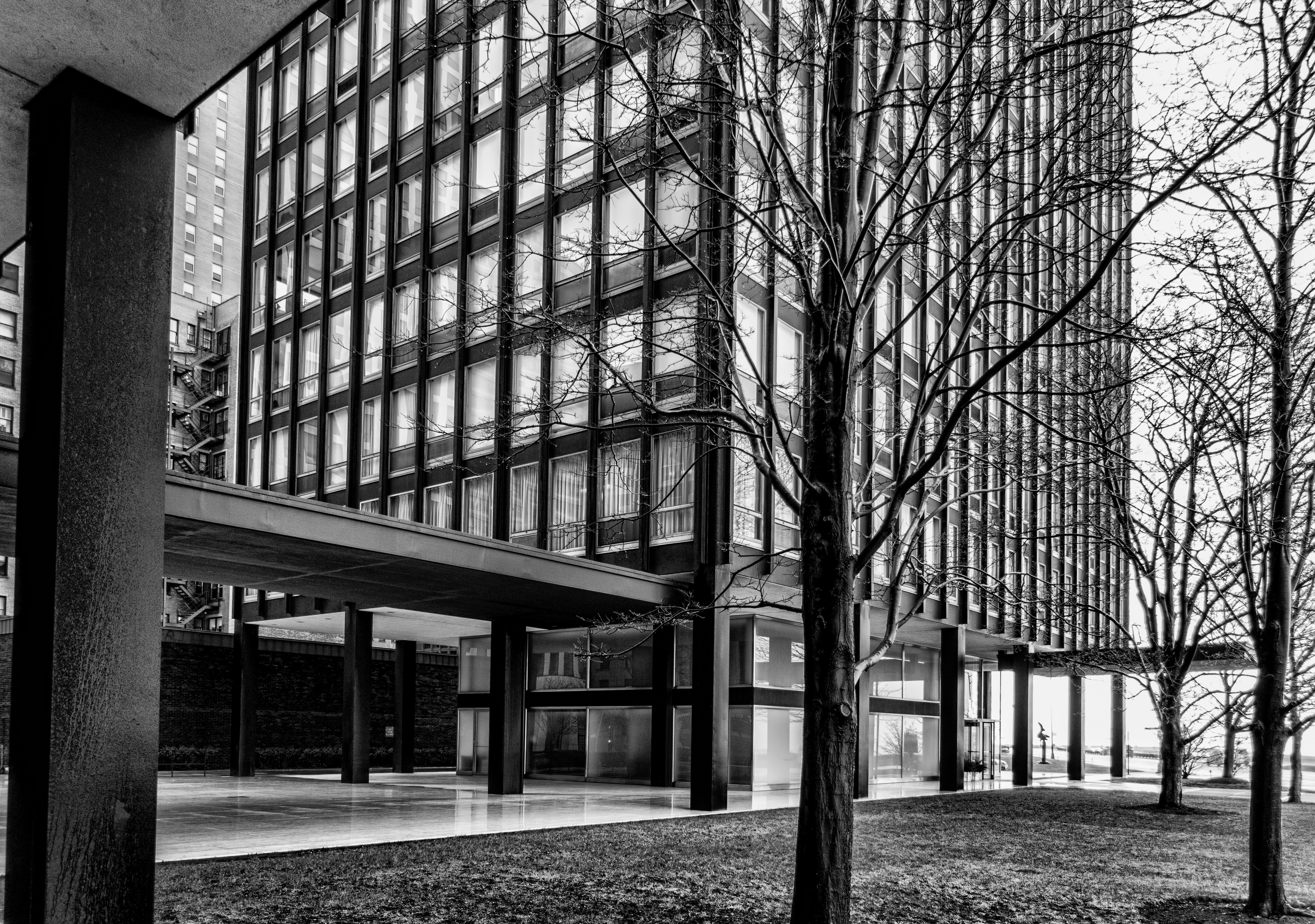
880 North Lake Shore Drive as seen from 860 North Lake Shore Drive

An arcade surrounds the ground (or first) story of both buildings, exposing some of the superstructure's columns to plain view. The ground stories of both buildings have glass walls; the lobbies have transparent glass and the service areas next to each lobby opaque glass, similar to Mies's earlier German Pavilion. The glass walls are backlit from inside during the nighttime, giving the impression that each tower was floating. Although Mies's decision to use opaque windows has been cited as a practical way to conceal the mechanical equipment, they also highlighted the superstructure's columns at night.

The soffits at the buildings' perimeters, along the ceilings of each arcade, have powerful spotlights that illuminate the arcades' floors and provide additional lighting for the lobbies' glass facades. Specially made lenses are placed over the lamps to distribute the light evenly over the facades. The lobbies have travertine floors and are connected by a travertine walkway. The pathway connects two travertine plazas surrounding the towers, creating a plinth. Around 1,100 stone slabs weighing up to 175 pounds (79 kg) each were used to construct the lobbies, walkway, and the plazas outside the buildings. Just above ground level, a steel canopy runs above a walkway connecting the south tower's northern facade and the north tower's southern facade.

==== Upper stories ====
On and above the second story of both buildings, the facade's glass windows run from the floor to the ceiling. The windows are separated vertically by mullion bars and horizontally by spandrel panels between different floors; the aluminum mullions run nearly the buildings' entire height. On each floor, each bay has a 21-by-9-foot (6.4 m × 2.7 m) opening. There are four window panes per opening, which are set into aluminum frames. The panes are divided into a larger upper section and a smaller lower section, which swing inward from hinges on the ceiling and floor, respectively. The buildings have a combined 3,232 panes with 130,000 square feet (12,000 m^{2}) of glass. To prevent rain from entering the buildings during high winds, steel and rubber strips are affixed to the windows' edges. The windows' dimensions and the protruding mullions allowed Mies to emphasize both buildings' vertical design details over their horizontal details.

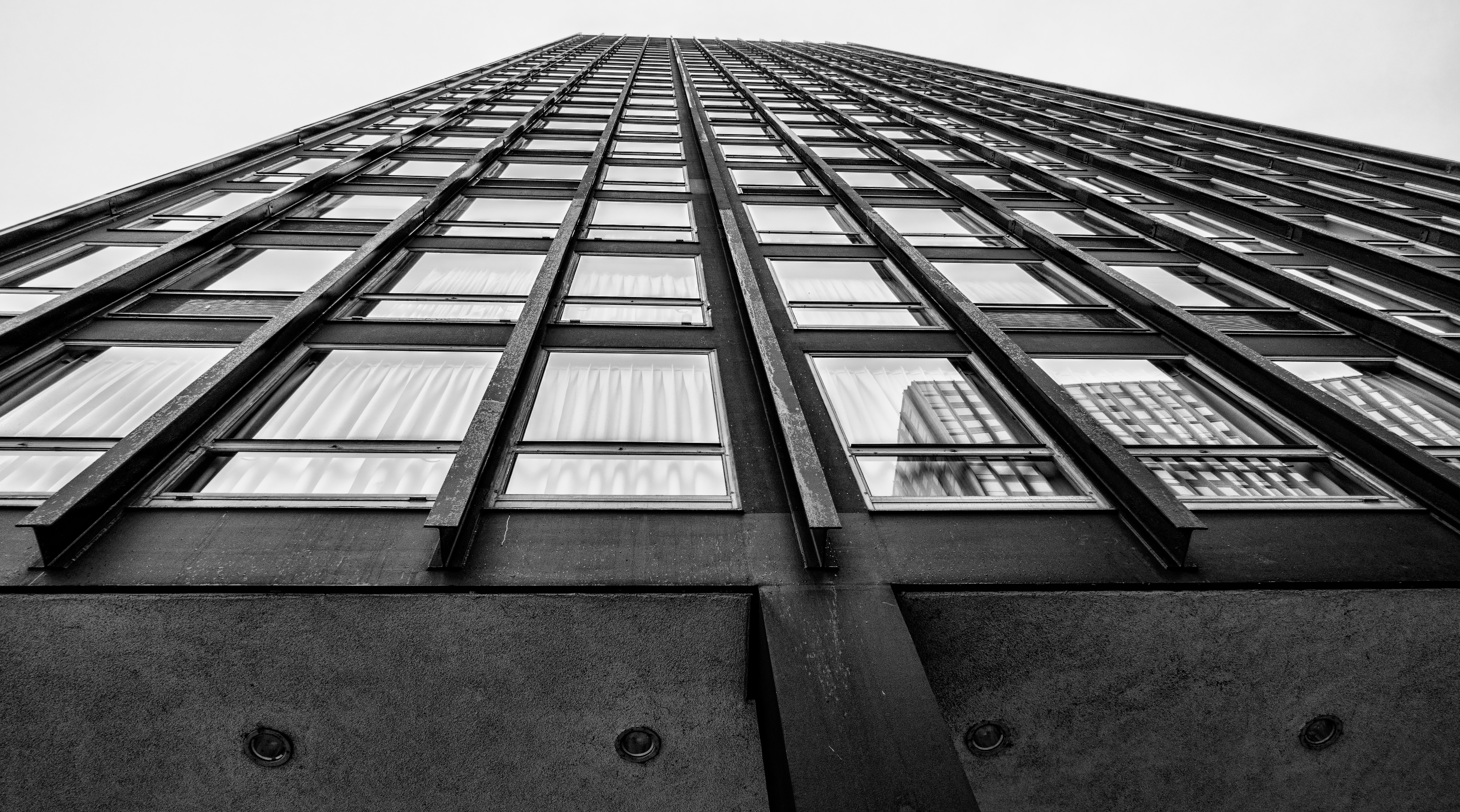
Detail of 880 North Lake Shore Drive's facade from ground level, showing the I-beams

The centers of each mullion are spaced 5 1/4 feet (1.6 m) apart, corresponding to one-fourth the width of the bays inside. Protruding I-beams are welded to the mullions. Each of the I-beams is about 8 inches (20 cm) thick, and the tops and bottoms of the I-beams are cut off, allowing the beams' cross sections to be seen. Architectural writers criticized the I-beams when the buildings were constructed, since the material was being used for purely decorative purposes, and since the use of decorative design details ostensibly contravened Mies's longstanding tendency not to use materials unless absolutely necessary. Mies told one reporter that there was both a "real reason" and a "good reason" for the I-beams' existence. While the "good reason" was to stiffen steel plates in the superstructure, the "real reason" was that the I-beams were intended to represent the steel superstructure, which was exposed only at the ground level. The I-beams also broke up the otherwise-flat facades, and, as sunlight hit the I-beams throughout the day, they cast shadows in specific patterns. All exterior steel was coated in black enamel paint, without any other surface finish.

The designs of 860–880 Lake Shore Drive's superstructures and facades are closely correlated, in contrast to Mies's later designs where the facade had little, if anything, to do with the superstructure. Each bay is divided by concrete-encased columns at the buildings' perimeters. The concrete columns cannot be seen from the outside, as they are hidden behind steel plates, which have I-beams welded to them, matching the designs of the mullions between the windows. In both buildings, the columns at each corner are covered with steel plates on two sides. Although the mullions are equidistant, the columns protrude about 9 inches (23 cm) into each bay, so the two outer windows in each bay (immediately next to the columns) are narrower than the two inner windows. Adjacent mullions and spandrels for rectangles that were similar in proportion to the footprints of each building. 860–880 Lake Shore Drive is Mies's only design where the curtain wall is flush with the exterior columns; in all of his other designs, the curtain wall is either hung outside or was recessed into the superstructure. The facades lack other traditional design details such as cornices, and there are also no balconies.

=== Interior ===
When the towers were built, exposed steel superstructures above a building's first story were banned under Chicago's building codes, preventing Mies from exposing the buildings' steel frames on the upper floors. As a result, the columns in both buildings' superstructures (including at the perimeter) are encased in concrete above the ground story, which influenced his decision to put I-beams on the facade. Vierendeel trusses are used to support the upper floors; although the trusses are light, they also tend to make the upper stories sway considerably. The superstructures are made primarily of steel, as opposed to Mies's later 900–910 North Lake Shore Drive, where the frames are made entirely of concrete. The beams are all welded together.

Beneath both buildings are two basements with storage space, deep freezers, laundry rooms, and sitting rooms. There is also a garage below both buildings; sources disagree on whether it has 100 or 116 parking spots. Barcelona chairs are installed in the lobby of either tower. The core of each building is used for circulation and includes elevators, hallways, and stairs. Each building has two elevators that serve all stories. The cores also contain each apartment's bathrooms and kitchens.

==== Apartments ====
Each of the upper stories measures 10 feet (3.0 m) high, with either three and a half or six rooms in each apartment. The original plans called for 92 large units and 192 small units, but 40 of the small units were combined to make 20 large units, for a total of 116 large apartments and 152 small apartments. All of the south tower's apartments and half of the north tower's apartments had windows on two sides. The six-room units were originally located in the south tower, while the three-and-a-half-room units were in the north tower. The larger apartments had three bedrooms each, spanning 1,400 square feet (130 m^{2}), and the smaller units had one bedroom each, spanning 700 square feet (65 m^{2}). There were initially four apartments per floor in the south tower and eight per floor in the north tower.

The apartment layouts are influenced by the facades' designs and the buildings' footprints. Mies had originally proposed arranging the apartments in an open plan, but Greenwald forced Mies to add walls between the rooms in each apartment. After his open-plan floor layouts were rejected, Mies almost quit the project entirely. Mies also wanted to add a service entrance to each apartment, but this was discarded from the final plan. The final arrangement was a compromise between Mies's original concept and Greenwald's requirements, and many of the units have since been combined. Similarly to Mies's earlier Farnsworth House in Plano, Illinois, bedrooms and other living spaces are positioned around the kitchens and bathrooms in the core. The dining alcoves in the north tower's apartments abut the core, while the alcoves in the south tower's apartments abut the curtain wall. The building's 21-by-21-foot (6.4 by 6.4 m) square bays influenced the interior layout; for example, living rooms span the entire width of a bay, while dining rooms and bedrooms span half a bay.

When the buildings were finished in 1951, the apartments had a myriad of closets, and Mies said that the full-height windows on the facade provided a plethora of natural light. The units also have radiant heating systems, and there are convection heaters near the windows. Originally, the towers had no building-wide air conditioning; Mies's original plans for a central air system, which would have cooled the apartments, were canceled due to its expense. Instead, dozens of residents retrofitted their apartments with air-conditioning units. Mies wanted each floor to look exactly the same from the outside, so the same gray color was used for all of the curtains directly behind each window. Behind each curtain is a rail where occupants could install a curtain of their own design. Several tenants decorated their own apartments in their own styles. Though the finishes, kitchens, and bedrooms in some apartments have since been modified, much of Mies's original design remains intact.

== History ==
In 1946, Greenwald became acquainted with Mies, who then was developing Farnsworth House. Though Greenwald was thirty years younger than Mies, they remained frequent collaborators until Greenwald died in 1959. Greenwald was motivated to develop buildings of high architectural quality. Additionally, the 1933 Century of Progress world's fair had spurred the construction of modern architecture in Chicago, and architects such as Mies and Loebl Schlossman & Hackl had been inspired to build modernist structures there.

The first building Greenwald hired Mies to design was the Promontory Apartments on South Lake Shore Drive, completed in 1949. Due to World War II-era steel shortages, that building had a reinforced concrete facade, rather than the steel-and-glass facade Mies had wanted. Mies nonetheless drew up an alternate plan for a structure with a steel-and-glass facade, which he later reused for 860–880 Lake Shore Drive. Before the Lake Shore Drive project, Mies had been considering a steel-and-glass skyscraper for three decades but had been unable to realize his design; as early as 1920, he had been drawing up designs for towers with steel skeletons. After the Promontory Apartments were completed, Mies and Greenwald had considered several other designs along Lake Michigan, which were ultimately not built.

=== Development ===
==== Design and financing ====
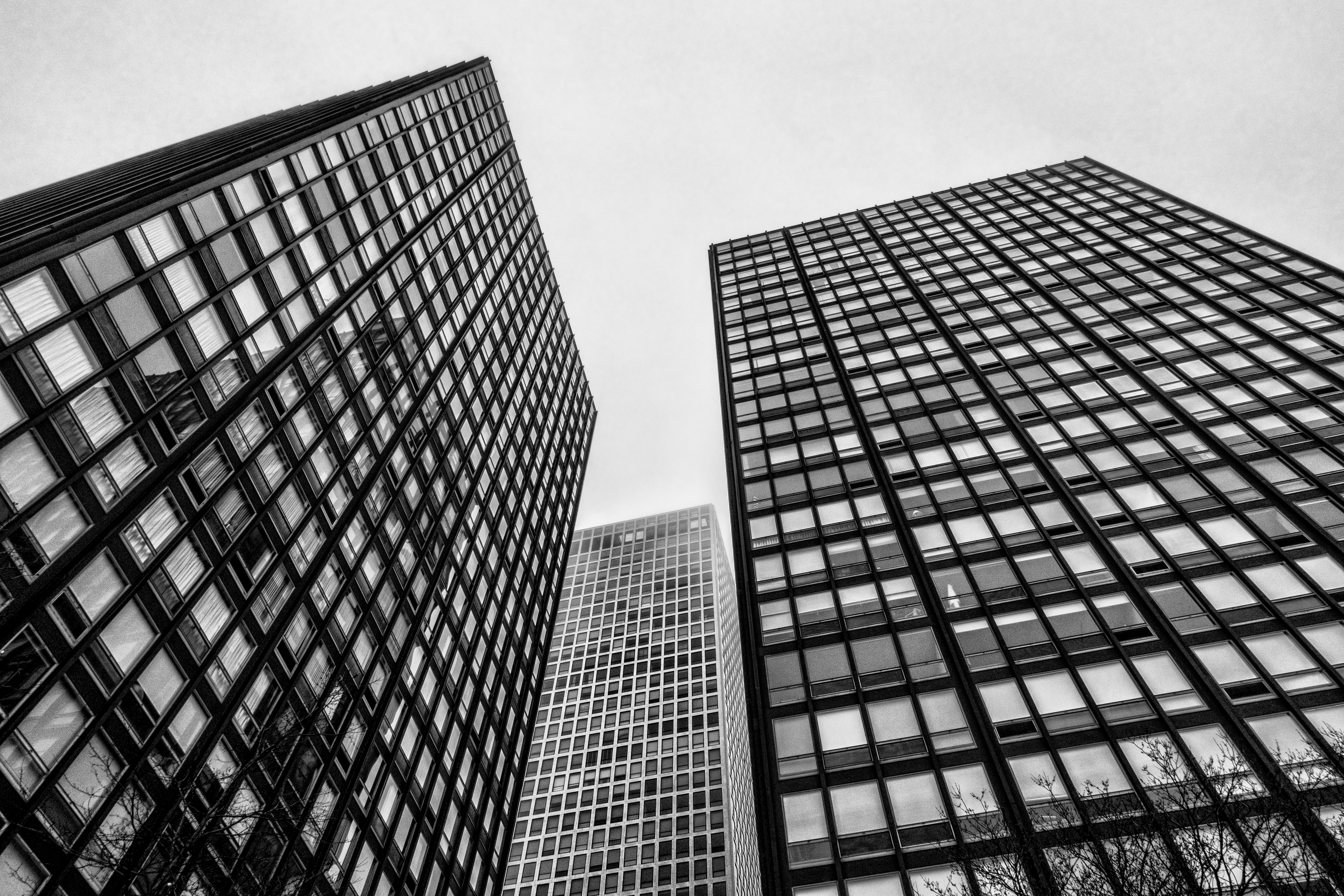
860–880 Lake Shore Drive seen from ground level

After the Promontory Apartments, Mies's next collaboration with Greenwald was at 860–880 Lake Shore Drive. Northwestern University, the seller of the land, still owned a parcel to the west. When the site of 860–880 Lake Shore Drive was acquired in 1948, Northwestern had agreed to sell only if Lake Michigan remained visible from the other plot to the west. This requirement prompted Greenwald and his development partner—Robert Hall McCormick, the son of Robert R. McCormick—to plan two buildings on the site, rather than one. Greenwald and McCormick announced plans for two 25-story cooperative apartment towers at 860–880 Lake Shore Drive in April 1949. There would be 92 six-room apartments, 192 three-and-a-half-room apartments, and 25 studio apartments, along with 100 parking spaces. The development would have a steel-and-glass facade, since the wartime steel shortage was no longer as severe. The idea for a glass facade was attributed to McCormick.

The buildings were to be financed with a $3.1 million mortgage loan, (Note: Equivalent to $32.28 million in 2024) which would be paid off over twenty years and split between the tenants. Since the buildings were to be co-ops, each tenant also had to pay a monthly maintenance fee. The real-estate company Baird & Warner, acting on behalf of the developers, tried to obtain financing, but prospective lenders were reluctant to give money to a development with so many novel design features. In July 1949, the Mutual Benefit Life Insurance Company agreed to lend $3.1 million.

Mies's employee Joseph Fujikawa worked with Holsman, Holsman, Klekamp & Taylor to create blueprints for the towers, and Charles B. Genther of Pace Associates spent three months creating working drawings and soliciting bids from prospective construction contractors. Unlike other apartment buildings, where design started with the facade and worked inward, Mies designed the superstructure first and the facade afterward. The height of each tower was dictated by the need to maximize usable space on the upper stories, given the limited floor area available. The architectural historian William Jordy later recalled that Mies had considered even a 12-story building to be too tall and that Mies thought the towers "became very thin" at their final height, considering the buildings' increasing height-to-width ratios.

==== Construction ====
A formal groundbreaking ceremony took place on December 17, 1949, at which point more than half of the apartments had been sold. The American Bridge Company received the contract for the buildings' steelwork, while Greenwald's company Metropolitan Structures Inc. was the general contractor. To provide seating for the lobbies, Mies asked one of his acolytes to consult photographs of Barcelona chairs (which Mies had designed for the Barcelona Pavilion two decades prior) and draw up modern plans. Work on the south tower was delayed after workers discovered a derelict water tunnel 83 feet (25 m) below the ground, which had served the Near North Side of Chicago until around 1890. Five of the south tower's footings had to be relocated as a result. Although the north tower's superstructure had reached the 14th story by July 1950, the south tower's foundation was still being constructed. By then, 72% of the units had been sold for between $13,500 and $27,000 each. (Note: Equivalent to $128,000–255,000 in 2024)

The facade was constructed modularly, with two-story-high panels manufactured elsewhere and then welded together. The panels divided the facade into bays with four windows per story. In contrast to earlier concrete buildings, where wet concrete was poured into temporary wooden formwork, the concrete columns at both buildings were poured into a formwork made of steel plates. The steel plates remained on the facades after the columns were poured, eliminating the need to cover up the concrete with some other material. Mies contemplated painting the steel beams red, yellow, or some other color, but he ultimately decided to paint them black. The windows were also assembled from inside the building, eliminating the need to use scaffolding on the facade. They were originally dubbed the "glass houses"; due to the materials used in the buildings, one source referred to them as the "World's First Multiple Glass House".

During construction, in 1951, a worker died after falling down an elevator shaft. In part because of Chicago's postwar housing shortage, the developers had sold 95% of the apartments in the buildings by June 1951. All of the six-room apartments had been sold by August, while only 17 three-and-a-half-room apartments remained. Residents rapidly moved in while apartments were being completed. The structures ultimately cost $6 million. (Note: Equivalent to $56.74 million in 2024) Averaging $10.38 per square foot ($111.7/m^{2}), (Note: Equivalent to $98.15 per square foot, or $9.08 per square meter, in 2024) the buildings were less expensive than comparable apartment buildings of similar size, and they cost less than even the public housing complexes developed by the Chicago Housing Authority.

=== 1950s to 1980s ===
The buildings were formally completed in August 1952, and Mutual Benefit Life extended its $3.1 million mortgage on the buildings that year. Robert Picking, a local architect, was the first resident to formally move in. Early tenants represented a wide range of professions, including businesspeople, doctors, and lawyers; the towers also housed dozens of architects, as did the later development at 900–910 Lake Shore Drive Most of the original tenants were more than 50 years old, and there were few single-person households or young families. Although both pets and children were allowed to live in the buildings, the Chicago Tribune wrote that there were only 14 pets, fewer than a dozen teenagers, and two infants when the buildings were completed. Apartment owners were allowed to rent out their units, but only for up to 24 months at a time. Many residents moved to 860–880 Lake Shore Drive because of the shorefront location and because of the views out the full-height windows.

Mies owned an apartment on the 21st floor but did not live there, though he did bring students there for occasional tours. The Chicago Tribune wrote that there was speculation that he did not want to hear his tenants' complaints, while the architect Bruce Graham said Mies had told him that there was nowhere to put the furniture. The buildings' initial lack of air conditioning and their exposure to large amounts of direct sunlight, particularly during the summer, caused them to heat up. There were also no garbage chutes, and Mies was aware of leaks in the buildings even before their completion, having futilely tried to patch them. Many tenants decided to install a second curtain behind the buildings' original drapes, and dozens of families installed air conditioning in their own apartments. The towers also swayed, particularly during high winds, but tenants eventually became used to the swaying.

After more tenants with pets moved into the towers, the buildings' trustees banned pets in 1954. The trustees attempted to evict several pet owners in 1957, and they also filed lawsuits against tenants, with mixed results. A tenant of number 880 was killed in a single-apartment fire in 1970. The buildings remained well-known in the 1970s, even though they were no longer referred to as "the glass houses". By the 1980s, the smaller apartments typically cost $50,000–80,000 apiece, (Note: Equivalent to $121,000–194,000 in 2024) while the larger apartments cost around $120,000 apiece. (Note: Equivalent to $290,000 in 2024) During that decade, the lobbies' opaque glass panes were replaced with an aquamarine-tinted translucent glass.

=== 1990s to present ===
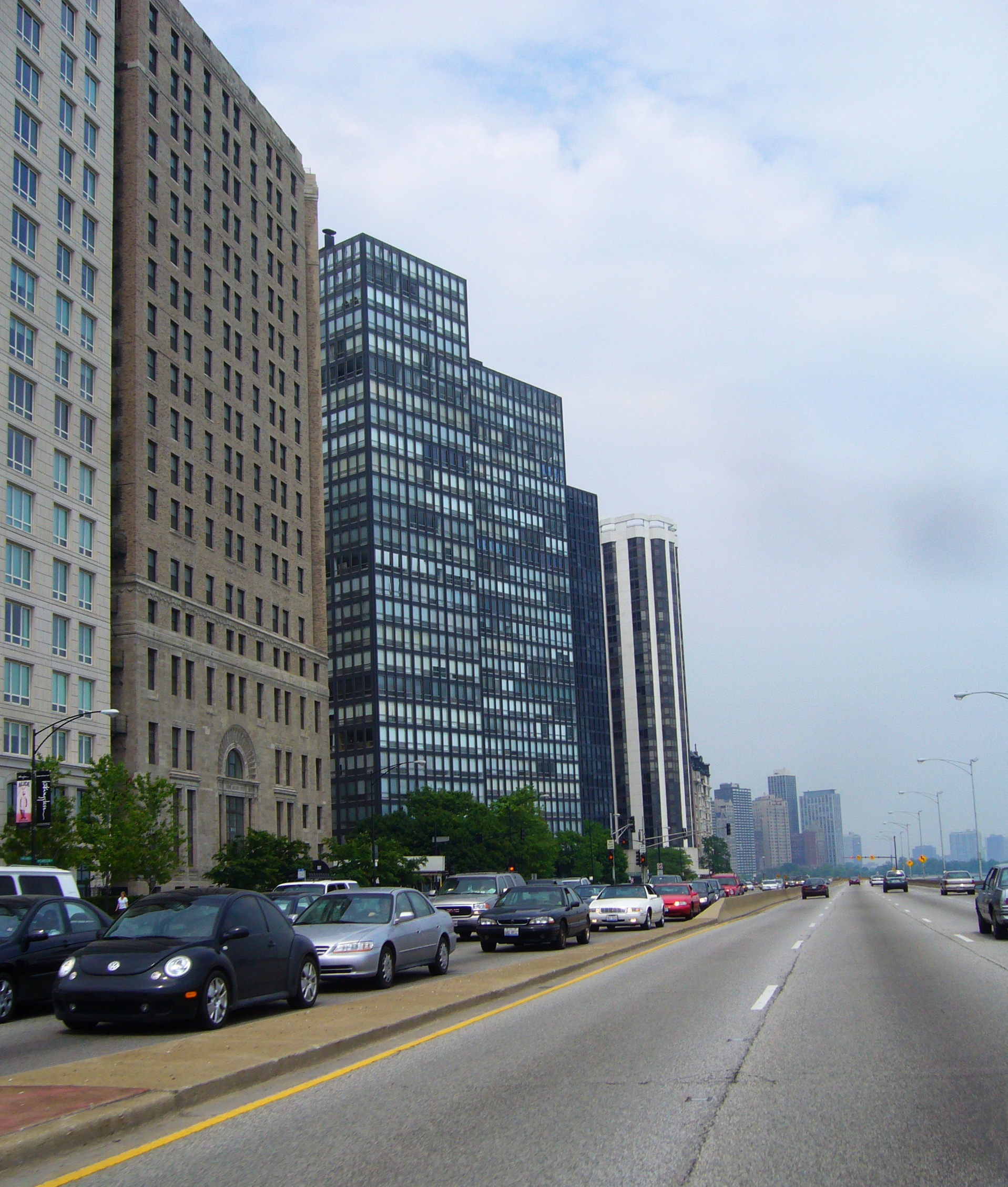
The buildings (center) as seen from Lake Shore Drive

Between 1990 and 1992, the leaking windows were resealed for $1.5 million, (Note: Equivalent to $43.87 million in 2024) and the facades restored. Residents hosted a celebration in 1992 to celebrate the buildings' 40th birthday, at which point many tenants said they still loved the buildings. By then, nineteen of the original tenants remained, and there were 20 architects living across both buildings. The towers contained a total of 248 apartments, as some of the original apartments had been combined; the south tower had 90 units, while the north tower had 158 units. Some of the residents continued to rent out their units. The towers had higher maintenance costs than the neighboring 900–910 Lake Shore Drive, in part due to number 860–880's small elevators and lack of garbage chutes.

Due to water damage and exterior deterioration over the years, the buildings were restored starting in 2007. Krueck and Sexton Architects of Chicago were commissioned to oversee the renovation, along with the preservation architects Gunny Harboe Architects. They were directed to fix prior renovations that had undermined the historical appearance of the towers, restore the lighting scheme, and renovate the plaza. The plaza's original stone slabs were cracked, and inadequate waterproofing had caused leaks in the basement, so the slabs were all replaced. An additional coat of acrylic paint was applied to the steelwork on the upper floors, while the paint on the first floor of both buildings was completely replaced. The renovation was completed in December 2009; the cost is variously cited as being between $8 million and $9.2 million.

== Impact ==
=== Reception ===
==== Contemporary ====
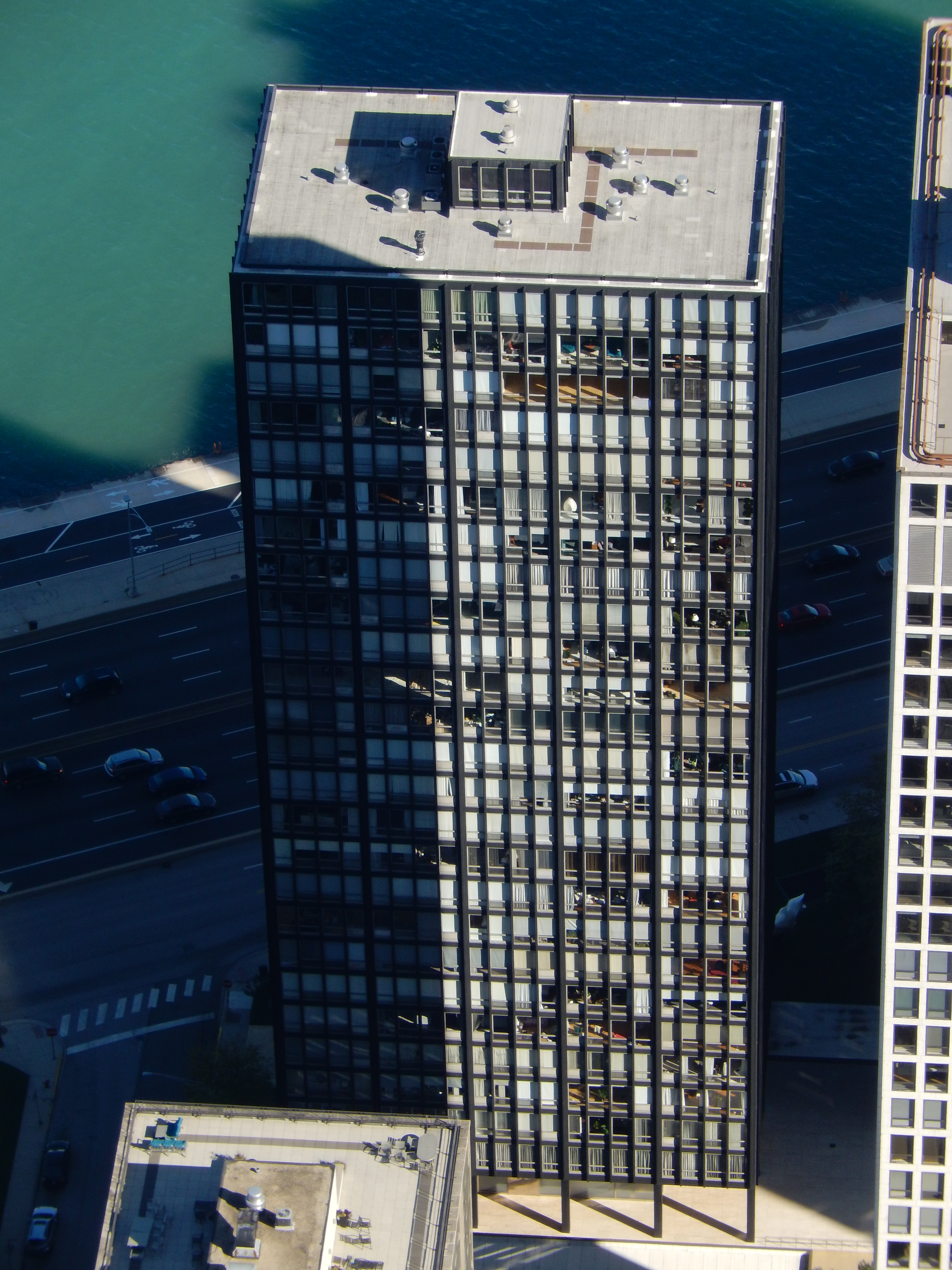
880 North Lake Shore Drive, viewed from 875 North Michigan Avenue

When the buildings were constructed, they were controversial because their style was so different from previous skyscrapers. The architect Frank Lloyd Wright expressed his disappointment that Mies had chosen to create such a design. A writer for the Western Mail in Cardiff said that Mies's orderly design of the buildings resembled the "sterilised order of the science laboratory", while a writer for The New York Times said that the buildings were "a lovely laboratory concept" that nonetheless were bound to annoy some observers. Architectural Forum magazine said in 1955 that, while 860–880 Lake Shore Drive was successful, it had inspired several derivatives of markedly lower quality. The next year, a member of a panel for Architectural Record magazine wrote that the complex "is perfect in its proportions, serene in its stand". When Life magazine took pictures of the towers in 1957, they were captioned as "animated and inanimate, revealing yet restrained", as perceived from Lake Michigan.

==== Retrospective ====
When Mies died in 1969, The New York Times wrote that Mies had considered 860–880 Lake Shore Drive his fourth-favorite design, after Crown Hall, the Chicago Federal Center, and the Seagram Building, Ross Miller, writing for Critical Inquiry in 1979, said the towers "seem static in their strict geometry of right angles, but manage a dance of shadows that gives each work a dynamic quality". In 1986, a writer for Artforum magazine said the towers and the Farnsworth House were "uncompromised realizations of Mies's rigorous ethic". The critic Herbert Muschamp, writing in 1993, regarded the structures as "endlessly complex, acutely sensitive to context" and said that their design embraced the proximity of Lake Michigan. Also in the late 20th century, the photographer Walter Peterhans and the historian Julius Posener both compared the buildings' I-beams to Gothic structures' architectural details (such as buttresses), which in some cases were purely decorative. The Society of Architectural Historians praised the lighting scheme in 2007, describing it as an essential part of Mies's design. Other observers praised the towers' timeless appearance.

Writing about the buildings' architectural impact, Mies's biographer David A. Spaeth said in 1985 that the buildings had "established a new standard of excellence for the apartment building", as they were among the first entirely steel-and-glass apartment buildings worldwide. Peterhans said that the towers' construction proved the viability of steel skeletal frames in architecture, contrasting with the masonry facades and smaller windows of earlier buildings. The American Institute of Architects' (AIA) Guide to Chicago regarded the buildings as having had a greater impact on contemporary architects than any of Mies's other works, writing that "the influence of these structures was to pervade much of modern architecture".

The architect Robert A. M. Stern, in 1976, described structures like 860–880 Lake Shore Drive as "a wonderful piece of structure, but not so wonderful as a place to live", saying that they were indistinguishable from office buildings. Commentators in the 1980s mocked Mies's "less is more" principle, describing the buildings as having a "less-is-a-bore" design, and during that decade, Paul Richard of The Washington Post described the I-beams on the facade as being functionally useless. Blair Kamin wrote in 2014 that the buildings' facades would "seem less elegant and less revolutionary" if it were not for the presence of a masonry building directly to the south, the Lake Shore Athletic Club at 850 North Lake Shore Drive. Werner Blaser stated in 1999 that the building "opposes [Louis] Sullivan's famous axiom 'form follows function' with the term 'structure'", in that the buildings' superstructures did not at all indicate their interior uses. The next year, Architectural Record magazine described 860–880 Lake Shore Drive as one of the United States' "most famous [architectural] works of the mid-20th century" that were protected as local or national landmarks.

=== Landmark designations ===
The building was one of the first official landmarks designated in 1958 by the then-new Commission on Chicago Architectural Landmarks, as well as one of the youngest landmarks so designated. Each building's lobby includes a metallic plaque in honor of this designation, which was dedicated in February 1960. After the original landmark commission was repealed, the modern Commission on Chicago Landmarks had considered designating the buildings as Chicago Landmarks starting in 1969, but this was postponed twice due to opposition. In a survey in 1980, the majority of residents opposed landmark designation, as they did not want a governmental agency to control future modifications to the buildings. Even though Chicago Landmark designations could be made without the owners' agreement, the alderman representing the area, Burton Natarus, had recommended that the commission not vote on the landmark designation unless the building's residents supported it.

The city landmark designation was stalled until 1996, when city aldermen rescinded temporary protections from pending landmarks, which had prevented their demolition until their landmark nomination was decided. The aldermen wished to resolve a legal uncertainty in which the landmark decision (and thus the removal of protections) could occur at any time. By then, 104 of 280 households supported landmark protection while 40 households opposed it, and the buildings' trustees narrowly voted to recommend designation. After Natarus and other aldermen voted in favor of the designation, 860–880 Lake Shore Drive received Chicago Landmark status on June 10, 1996, which prevented modifications without the commission's approval. A square plaque honoring this designation is on a railing near number 860, the south tower. The towers were the first Mies buildings to be designated as Chicago Landmarks, as well as the first post-World War II buildings to be so designated.

The towers were also added to the National Register of Historic Places (NRHP) in 1980. Although NRHP listings were generally required to be at least 50 years old, an exception was made for 860–880 Lake Shore Drive because of the towers' architectural significance. The NRHP designation also did not prevent unauthorized modifications to the structures.

=== Media and awards ===
During the buildings' construction, Edward Duckett of Mies's office created an architectural model of one of the towers, which was displayed on Michigan Avenue as part of a promotional campaign for the development. Another model, measuring 6 feet (1.8 m) tall, was displayed in New York's Museum of Modern Art (MoMA) in 1950. After the buildings were completed, architectural students from around the world came to visit the structures. MoMA featured the towers in another exhibition about postwar architecture in 1953, and they were depicted in a book accompanying the exhibition. In subsequent years, the buildings were detailed in many modern-architecture books. Pictures of the towers were also shown at an architecture exhibit at the Sears Tower in the mid-1990s, which featured nine other Chicago buildings. The towers were showcased in Phyllis Lambert's traveling exhibit Mies in America in the early 2000s, and the Art Institute of Chicago also hosted material about them in a 2005 exhibit about post–World War II Chicago architecture.

The buildings received the Twenty-five Year Award from the AIA in 1976, in honor of the longevity of their design. In a poll of American architecture experts the same year, at least one expert ranked 860–880 Lake Shore Drive among the best structures in the United States. In June 2005, the United States Postal Service included the towers in the commemorative stamp program Masterworks of Modern Architecture, where they were listed as one of the "12 outstanding examples of modern buildings". In celebration of the 2018 Illinois Bicentennial, 860–880 Lake Shore Drive was selected as one of Illinois's 200 Great Places by the AIA's Illinois chapter, AIA Illinois.

=== Architectural influence ===
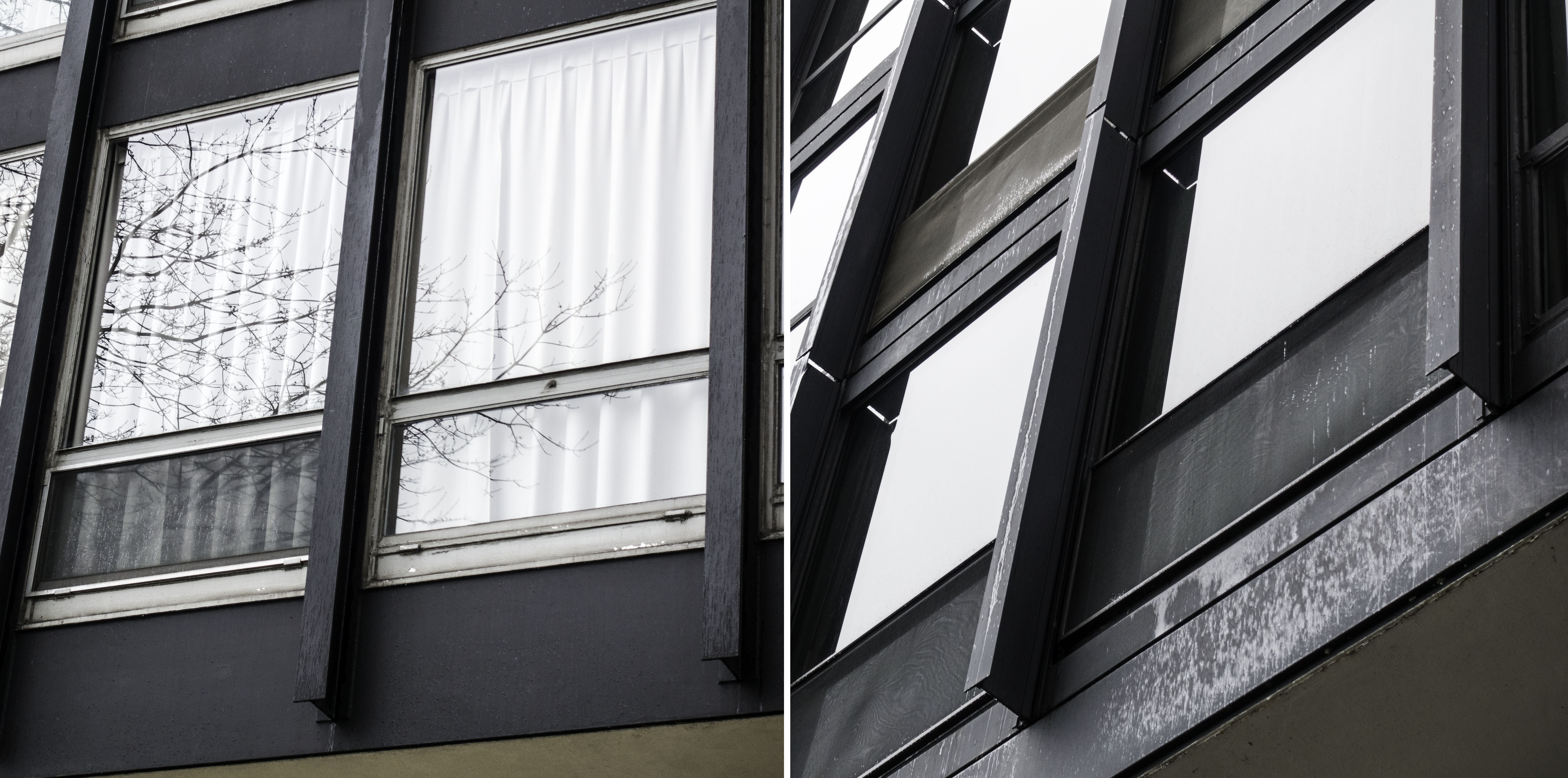
Comparison of windows at 860–880 (left) and 900–910 North Lake Shore Drive (right)

When the towers at 860–880 Lake Shore Drive were completed, they contrasted with the masonry apartment buildings that dominated Chicago at the time, and few buildings anywhere had a similar design. After the towers were finished, glass facades became more prevalent across Chicago apartment buildings, while apartments with balconies became less prevalent. A myriad of glass-box skyscrapers was also built in the U.S. Examples of such towers included the Lever House and Seagram Building in New York, as well as the Sears Tower and John Hancock Center in Chicago. Phyllis Lambert, whose father Samuel Bronfman's company had commissioned the Seagram Building, said that she had recommended that Mies design that building after seeing 860–880 Lake Shore Drive. Similar designs became commonplace internationally, and The Wall Street Journal described their use of prefabricated steel-and-glass exteriors as "one of [Mies's] crowning realizations". Mies's disciples copied elements of the design in projects around the world, though the biographer Detlef Mertins wrote that not all of these projects' facades were so closely related to their superstructures. When the buildings became Chicago Landmarks in 1996, the Associated Press noted that "all those other high-rises [in other big cities] look like these two".

The development helped bring attention to Mies's architectural style, The Chicago Tribune wrote in 1964 that 860–880 Lake Shore Drive, along with buildings such as Marina City, were examples of a new school of Chicago architecture. Another writer for the periodical Universitas wrote that it "does not seem possible" to create a steel-and-glass building with a simpler design than 860–880 Lake Shore Drive or the Seagram Building. Paul Gapp of the Chicago Tribune wrote in 1981 that 860–880 Lake Shore Drive was among the "internationally famed classics" designed by Mies in Chicago, and Gapp later wrote that the towers had helped make Mies "the 20th Century's single most influential architect". The historian Carl W. Condit wrote that the buildings had influenced modernist architecture in a similar manner to how the Empire State Building and the Woolworth Building had influenced earlier architectural styles.

After 860–880 Lake Shore Drive, Mies continued to use decorative I-beams in his designs during the rest of his career. He duplicated the building's floor grids at 900–910 Lake Shore Drive, across the street; that complex also has a black-painted aluminum facade, referencing the materials used at number 860–880. The design of number 860–880's facade was replicated in other skyscrapers that Mies designed during the rest of his career. Most of his residential buildings did not use protruding I-beams, but his office structures (like the Seagram Building, Toronto-Dominion Centre, and AMA Plaza) did use such a feature. Mies also designed the McCormick House in Elmhurst, Illinois, for Robert McCormick Jr., which was inspired by the interior design of 860–880 Lake Shore Drive. Luxus Magazine wrote that the towers' structural grid and facade became "the model for postwar modernist buildings".

== See also ==
- List of Chicago Landmarks
- National Register of Historic Places listings in Central Chicago
