= Herbert Greenwald =

American real estate developer (1915–1959)

Herbert Greenwald (August 16, 1915 – February 3, 1959) was a Chicago real estate developer who hired Ludwig Mies van der Rohe as the design architect for several landmark modern residential buildings.

== Personal life ==
Herbert "Squiff" Greenwald was born and raised in St. Louis. He pursued rabbinical studies at Yeshiva University in New York. After serving in the military during World War II, he studied philosophy at University of Chicago. He used money inherited from the death of his mother in 1949 to go into the real estate business with Samuel Katzin.

Herbert S. Greenwald was married to Lillian Feldman Greenwald (Dec. 31, 1915 to Sept. 7, 2007). They had two sons, Michael and Bennet. Together they supported artists including: Leon Golub, Nancy Spero, Cosmo Campoli, Misch Cohen, Ruth Duckworth, Richard Hunt (sculptor), David Sharpe, Martha Schlamme and Abraham Stokman.

Lillian Greenwald earned a BA degree and a M.SW degree from the University of Chicago. She served on the Visiting Committee of the University's School of Social Services Administration and may have influenced the decision to use Mies van der Rohe to design the School of Social Services building.

== Real estate development ==
Greenwald developed three residential buildings in Evanston, Il by 1946. Mr. Greenwald sought a famous architect to design his first important building. After failing to hire Frank Lloyd Wright, Le Corbusier, Eliel Saarinen, and Walter Gropius. He followed Gropius's recommendation to hire Mies van der Rohe.

Greenwald utilized Mies on several projects including:

- The Promontory, 5530 S. South Shore Drive, Chicago, IL (1949)
- Algonquin Apartments, 1606 E Hyde Park Blvd, Chicago, IL (1949-1951)
- 860-880 Lake Shore Drive Apartments, Chicago, IL (1949-1951)
- 900-910 North Lake Shore Esplanade Apartments, Chicago, IL (1953-1956)
- Commonwealth Plaza, 330-340 W. Diversey Parkway, Chicago, IL (1953-1956)
- Lafayette Park, Detroit, MI (1955-1963)

Additionally, he worked with Mies on several unbuilt designs including:

- 1300 Lake Shore Drive Apartments, Chicago, IL (1953-1956)
- Chestnut and DeWitt Apartments, Chicago, IL (1953-1956)
- Commonwealth Promenade Apartments, Chicago, IL (1953-1956) Note: Two of the buildings were built.
- Herbert Greenwald House, Lake Forest, IL (1955)
- Diversey-Lake Shore Drive Apartments, Chicago, IL (1956-1958)
- Hyde Park Urban Renewal, Chicago, IL (1959)
- Lafayette Park Detroit, MI (1955-1963)
- Bay Street at Hyde San Francisco, CA (1958)

== Mies-designed single family homes ==
In addition to the proposed home for Herbert Greenwald in Lake Forest, Mies designed single family homes for:

- Greenwald's brother, Morris Greenwald. The Morris Greenwald House, later renovated and expanded by Peter Gluck, is located at 11 Homeward Lake, Weston, Connecticut
- Greenwald's business partner, Robert Hall McCormick. The home is now part of the Elmhurst Art Museum in Illinois.

== Death ==
Greenwald died in the crash of American Airlines Flight 320 from Midway International Airport to New York City's LaGuardia Airport on February 3, 1959. The plane crashed in the East River and his body was not recovered. His estate was paid $287,000 by the insurance company.

== Successor Firm - Metropolitan Structures ==
After his death, his real estate firm, Herbert Realty Co., was renamed Metropolitan Structures. Under the leadership of Bernard Weissbourd, the firm developed Illinois Center in Chicago and other properties throughout North America including

- Colonnade and Pavilion Apartment Buildings, Newark, NJ (1960)
- One Charles Center, Baltimore, MD (1962)
- Highfield House, Baltimore, MD (1964)
- 2400 N. Lakeview, Chicago, IL (1964)
- 100 and 200 rue de Gaspé, Nuns' Island, Montreal, QC, Canada (1962)
- Nuns' Island gas station, Montreal, QC, Canada (1969)
- Illinois Center and 111 East Wacker Drive, Chicago, IL

== Bibliography ==
- They Built Chicago: Entrepreneurs Who Shaped a Great City's Architecture by Miles L. Berger August, 1992
- Mies, IIT, and the Second Chicago School Ryerson and Burnham Archives, The Art Institute of Chicago
