= Flamingo-on-the-Lake Apartments =

Apartment building in Chicago, Illinois

- U.S. National Register of Historic Places
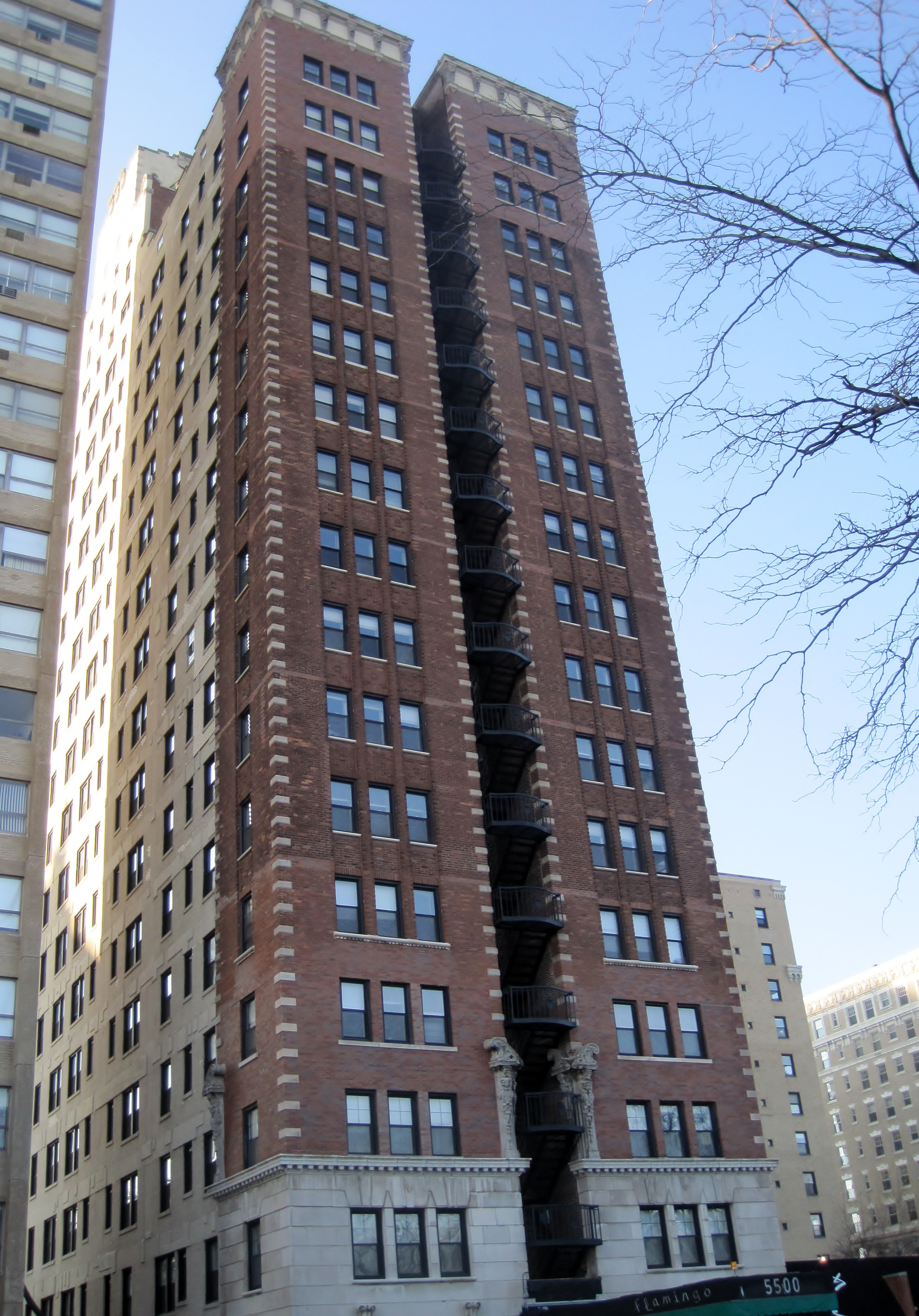
- The front of the apartments

- Location within Chicago metropolitan area Location within Illinois Location within the United States
- Location: 5500-5520 S. Shore Drive, Chicago, Illinois
- Coordinates: 41°47′41″N 87°34′51″W
- Area: Hyde Park, Chicago
- Built: 1927
- Architect: William C. Reichert
- Architectural style: Beaux Arts, Classical Revival
- NRHP reference No.: 86001194
- Added to NRHP: May 14, 1986

The Flamingo-on-the-Lake Apartments, also known as the Flamingo Apartment Hotel, is a building designed by architect William C. Reichert and located at 5500-5520 S. Shore Drive along Lake Michigan in the Hyde Park neighborhood of Chicago, Illinois. The 16-story apartment building was built with 144 apartments and 16 hotel rooms in 1927; it also featured an outdoor pool and bathhouse. It was designed in the Classical Revival style; its exterior is red brick with terra cotta ornamentation and a dentillated cornice. It and the adjacent building, The Promontory Apartments, a co-op building designed by Mies van der Rohe, are the furthest east buildings in Hyde Park.

The building was added to the National Register of Historic Places on May 14, 1986.

== See also ==
- National Register of Historic Places listings in South Side Chicago
