= AMA Plaza =

Skyscraper in Chicago, Illinois

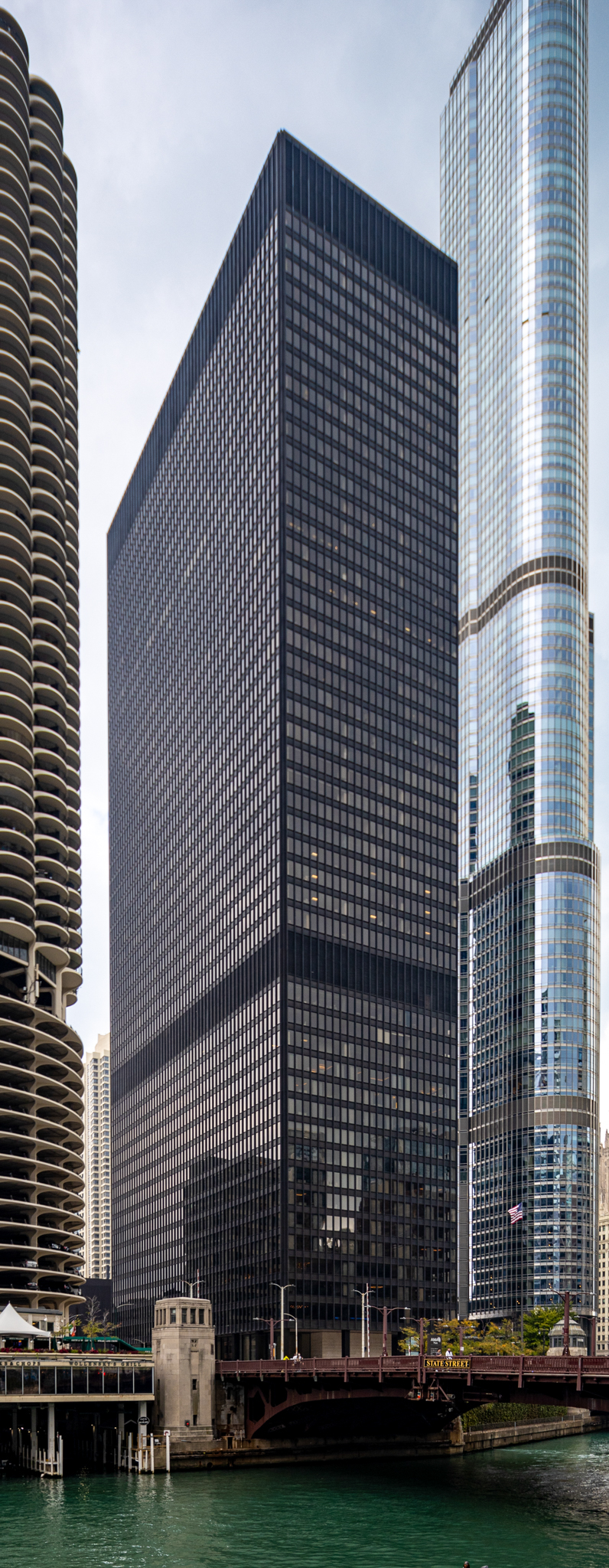
- Interactive map of the AMA Plaza area
- Alternative names: IBM Plaza; IBM Building; 330 North Wabash Avenue

General information
- Architectural style: International Style
- Location: 330 North Wabash Avenue; Chicago, Illinois, United States
- Coordinates: 41°53′19″N 87°37′39″W
- Construction started: February 1969
- Opened: September 20, 1972
- Renovated: 2010–2013 (hotel conversion of lower stories)
- Owner: Great Eagle Holdings (floors 2–13); Beacon Capital Partners (rest of building)
- Operator: Langham Hospitality Group (floors 2–13)

Height
- Height: 695 feet (212 m)

Technical details
- Material: Glass and steel
- Floor count: 52
- Floor area: 1,835,360 ft^{2} (170,511 m^{2})

Design and construction
- Architect: Ludwig Mies van der Rohe
- Engineer: C. F. Murphy

Other information
- Number of rooms: 316 (hotel)
- Public transit: Chicago "L": State/Lake station and Grand station
- IBM Building
- U.S. National Register of Historic Places
- Chicago Landmark
- Location within Chicago metropolitan area Location within Illinois Location within the United States
- Location: 330 North Wabash Avenue, Chicago, Illinois
- Built: 1972; 54 years ago
- Architect: Ludwig Mies van der Rohe
- NRHP reference No.: 09000166

Significant dates
- Added to NRHP: March 11, 2010
- Designated CHICL: February 6, 2008

AMA Plaza (formerly IBM Plaza or IBM Building; also known by its address 330 North Wabash Avenue) is a skyscraper in the River North neighborhood of Chicago, Illinois, United States. It was designed in the International Style by Ludwig Mies van der Rohe, with C. F. Murphy as the associate architect, and was the last building Mies designed in Chicago before his death in 1969. The tower is 695 feet (212 m) tall with 52 stories and, when completed in 1972, initially housed the Chicago offices of the technology firm IBM. Since 2013, the 2nd through 13th stories have functioned as a hotel called the Langham, Chicago, while the remaining stories continue to be used as offices. The building is listed on the National Register of Historic Places and is designated as a Chicago Landmark.

IBM officials first contacted Mies to design the building in 1966, and the company officially announced plans for the building in June 1968. Work began in February 1969, and the building was formally dedicated on September 20, 1972. After the last vacant offices were leased in 1975, the building remained fully occupied for two decades. IBM downsized its offices in the mid-1990s and sold it in 1996 to the Blackstone Group, which resold it in 1999 to Prime Group Realty. The building's two largest tenants, IBM and Jenner & Block, announced plans to move out during the mid-2000s, and the 2nd through 13th stories were sold off for hotel use in 2008. Following a major renovation of the entire building, Langham Hotels International opened the Langham hotel there in 2013, and the building was renamed that year for the American Medical Association (AMA), a major office tenant. Beacon Capital Partners bought the office stories in 2016 and conducted another renovation.

AMA Plaza is positioned near the northern end of the site, set back from the Chicago River, and is surrounded by an outdoor public plaza. A glass curtain wall, with vertical mullions of anodized aluminum, forms the building's exterior. The lobby's facade is set back behind an arcade of columns, while the upper stories are nearly identical in design. The superstructure is a steel frame, with its interiors divided into 30-by-40-foot (9.1 by 12.2 m) rectangular modules. The building was equipped with computer-controlled mechanical systems to increase energy efficiency. The entire ground level is occupied by a lobby, while the second floor (originally the dining room) contains a lobby and restaurant for the hotel. The upper floors were originally open plan offices, though the floors occupied by the hotel have since been subdivided. When AMA Plaza was completed, it received commentary on its design. Both the building and the Langham hotel have received awards, and the building has also been depicted in several works of popular media.

== Site ==
AMA Plaza, also known as the IBM Building, is located at 330 North Wabash Avenue in the River North neighborhood of Chicago, Illinois, United States. It was originally alternatively known as One IBM Plaza—a vanity address, since the building's real address was on Wabash Avenue. It is situated on an irregular 1.6-acre (0.65 ha) land lot on the northern bank of the Chicago River's main stem, just north of the Chicago Loop. The site occupies a city block between the Chicago River to the south, State Street and the State Street Bridge to the west, Kinzie Street to the north, and Wabash Avenue and the Wabash Avenue Bridge to the east. The section of Wabash Avenue adjacent to the building deviates from the Chicago street grid, curving slightly westward into the lot.

AMA Plaza is located just north of Chicago's theater district and is also near the Magnificent Mile shopping district on Michigan Avenue. In general, the buildings on adjacent blocks are mid-rise or high-rise buildings, with a mixture of residential and commercial uses. On the block immediately to the west are Marina City and Chicago Varnish Company Building, while to the east is the Trump International Hotel and Tower. Originally, the IBM Building faced the Sun Times Building to the east; that structure was replaced by the Trump Tower in the 2000s. Before the IBM Building was built, the Chicago Sun-Times operated a storage building on the site and owned an easement extending under Wabash Avenue to the basement level of the building. There are railroad tracks under the building, which were used by the Chicago and North Western Railway. There are also several Chicago "L" stations nearby, including State/Lake station across the Chicago River to the south and Grand station on State Street three blocks to the north.

The building is positioned near the northern end of the site, away from the Chicago River, preserving eastward views from Marina City. There is an outdoor public plaza surrounding AMA Plaza, which takes up half of the lot, extending south to the Chicago River shoreline. Due to space constraints, the sections of the plaza along the building's western and eastern facades is only 10 feet (3.0 m) wide. Because the plaza is slightly above State Street, there is a granite retaining wall on that street and stairs descending to sidewalk level at the northwest and southwest corners. The sections of the plaza along the northern and southern facades both have planting beds and granite benches, with more benches and plantings to the south than to the north. The plaza has a group of sculptures by the Taiwanese artist Ju Ming, known as The Gentlemen. It also has approximately 40 replicas of the Barcelona chairs that were designed by the building's architect, Ludwig Mies van der Rohe. At the south end of the plaza is an ivy-covered wall descending to the river.

== History ==
The building's first namesake, IBM, was established in the 1880s. It had maintained a Chicago office since either 1914 or 1916, initially employing a dozen people there. By the 1960s, IBM had more than 4,000 employees in Chicago alone, out of 240,000 worldwide. The company contemplated constructing a 40-to-50-story structure to host 2,000 of its staff, as well as other companies.

=== Development ===
==== Planning ====
IBM officials first contacted Ludwig Mies van der Rohe in 1966, hiring him to design them a new Chicago headquarters. That November, IBM obtained an option on a site along the Chicago River's northern bank, between Wabash Avenue and State Street, from the Chicago Sun-Times. When IBM finally bought the site, it agreed to provide space for a Sun-Times storage facility. The building was tentatively planned to cost $50 million. Upon being hired, Mies was driven to the site to inspect it. The plot, which resembled a boomerang in shape, was so awkwardly positioned that Mies reportedly asked, "Where's the site?"

IBM announced in June 1968 that it would construct a 52-story building on the site and that it had hired Mies and C. F. Murphy to design the structure. The building was to contain 1.78 million square feet (165,000 m^{2}), and IBM planned to occupy about half this space. The skyscraper itself would cover half the lot and would be surrounded by a plaza. It was to be the third-tallest building in Chicago, after the John Hancock Center and the First National Tower, and was IBM's largest office building to date. IBM also acquired part of the adjacent section of Wabash Avenue, which protruded into the site, and closed off that portion of Wabash Avenue. The company decided to position the new building away from the Chicago River, allowing a large public plaza to be built on the riverfront, while enabling views of Lake Michigan to the east. Since the site was zoned for mid-rise commercial and industrial development, IBM submitted a rezoning request to the Chicago City Council in August 1968, to permit the construction of an office tower there.

==== Construction ====
Work officially began in February 1969. IBM gave the general contract to Paschen Contractors, the steel contract to American Bridge Company, and the elevator contract to Otis Elevators. Mies completed his final drawings that July, less than a month before his death at the age of 83. Following Mies's death, Bruno Conterato, an associate with his firm, took over the development. Conterato devised a curtain wall that kept out moisture and provided insulation; this curtain wall cost 35–50% more than a convention curtain wall but was also intended to be much more energy-efficient. Mies's grandson Dirk Lohan, then in his early 30s, also assisted with the design. The IBM Building was one of several major high-rises constructed in Chicago during the late 1960s, along with Marina City, the John Hancock Center, the First National Tower, and the AT&T Building.

To accommodate the IBM Building, workers built an overpass over the railroad tracks and remodeled a bulkhead along the river. Work was briefly delayed in March 1970 due to a labor strike by heavy equipment operators, and further strikes were organized later the same year by delivery-truck drivers and cement masons. The steel superstructure had reached the 12th floor when the truck drivers went on strike in May 1970, and most of the lower-story finishes had been finished by then. During the building's development, in September 1970, U.S. President Richard Nixon visited the site and met with construction workers. Conterato also traveled to Rome, where the travertine marble for the lobby was being quarried, to ensure that the graining on the travertine slabs lined up with each other. The superstructure was finished by the end of the year. The building was nearly completed by mid-1971, and several tenants such as Arthur Young & Co. had already leased space by then. Despite decreased demand for office space in Chicago, real-estate experts anticipated that the building would not have much vacant space because IBM planned to occupy large parts of it.

=== IBM occupancy ===
==== 1970s ====
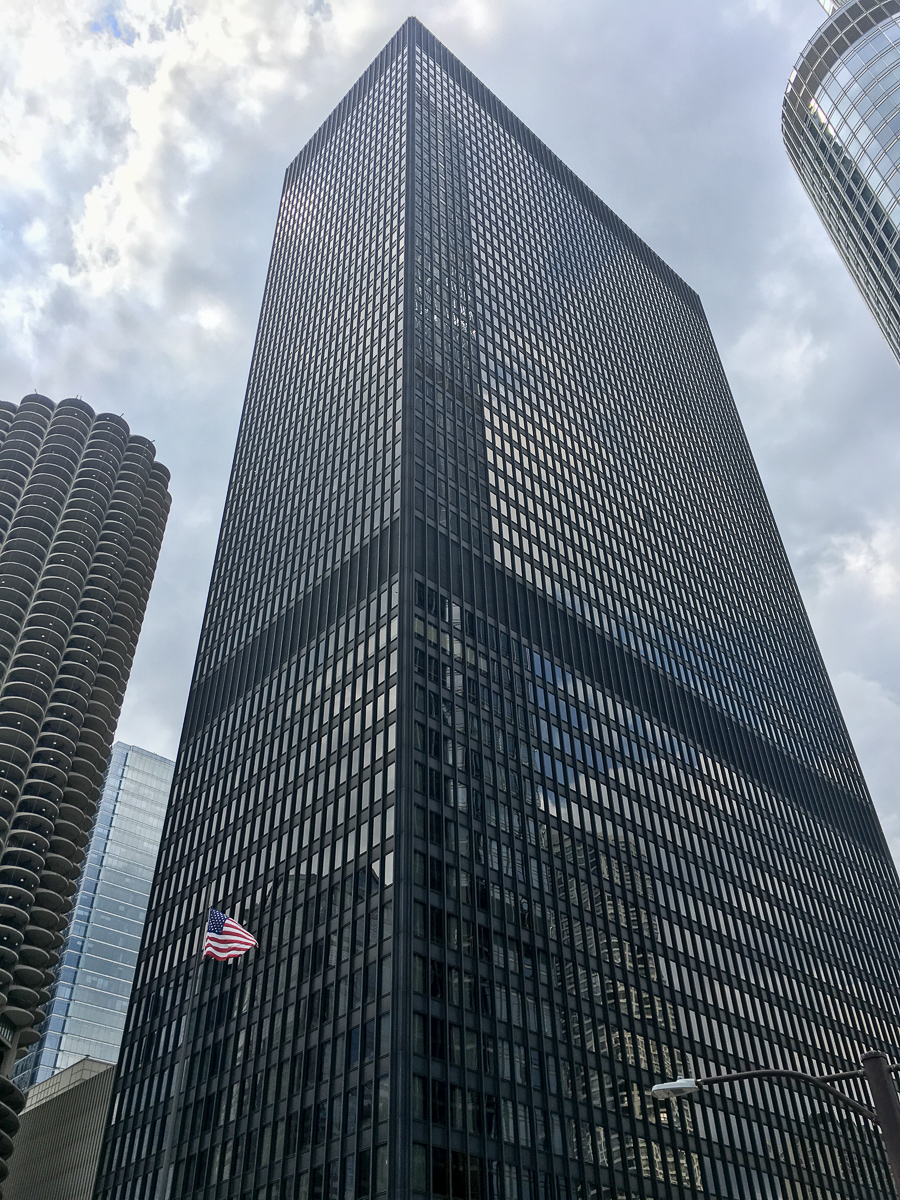
The building seen from the ground

IBM began relocating over 2,000 staff to the building in October 1971. The structure was formally dedicated on September 20, 1972; a bust of Mies, sculpted by Marino Marini, was dedicated in the building's public plaza the same day. It was one of several skyscrapers finished in Chicago that year, along with 2 Illinois Center and the Mid-Continental Plaza. Scribcor was the building's original manager, hiring and training service employees and security guards, and maintaining a newsletter for tenants. Among the first tenants were Arthur Young & Co., the law firm Jenner & Block, and the record label Mercury Records. Firms with smaller offices were placed on intermediate floors between tenants with larger offices. This allowed larger tenants to expand their offices to adjacent floors when smaller tenants' leases expired, rather than occupying non-contiguous space in the building.

The IBM Building was almost fully leased by July 1973, with up to 80 companies occupying space there as its peak. The building had been planned with only 40 parking spaces, even though it was estimated that the building's tenants needed at least ten times as much parking. As such, IBM drew up plans for a separate parking garage at Wabash Avenue and Kinzie Street; this parking garage, designed by George Schipporeit, was completed in 1974. That same year, IBM offered to donate $175,000 for a public park (later the Chicago Riverwalk) on the southern bank of the Chicago River, directly south of the building. After the last vacant offices were leased in 1975, the building remained fully occupied for the next two decades. The same year, the building was slightly damaged by a bombing, for which a Puerto Rican separatist group, Fuerzas Armadas de Liberación Nacional Puertorriqueña, claimed responsibility.

In the IBM Building's early years, its energy-efficient mechanical systems saved $50,000 monthly and reduced energy use from 9 to 5 million kilowatts (12,100,000 to 6,700,000 hp) per month, compared with buildings of similar size. The mechanical systems also helped the building function efficiently during the 1970s energy crisis in the U.S., which started shortly after the building opened, and an IBM executive credited the mechanical systems with giving the building a timeless quality. The structure accommodated 5,800 workers by the late 1970s, and its maintenance crew had about 100 employees.

==== 1980s and 1990s ====
IBM installed an antenna atop the building in 1980 for Satellite Business Systems' satellite network, and the company constructed a park along the Chicago River near the building during that decade. By the mid-1980s, office space in the building generally rented for $28 per square foot ($300/m^{2}). This was among the most expensive office space in Chicago at the time, and it was near the average rental rate for newer office space in the neighborhood. Jenner & Block expanded its offices in the building to 365,000 square feet (33,900 m^{2}) in the late 1980s, displacing several other law firms. Arthur Young & Co. also remained a major tenant, occupying 150,000 square feet (14,000 m^{2}), and it maintained offices there even after being merged into Ernst & Young in 1989. During the decade, the lobby hosted periodic exhibits, such as scale models of Leonardo da Vinci's inventions and a replica of the Statue of Liberty's torch. In addition, as part of a 1989 art installation, all of the building's windows were temporarily illuminated in red, white, or blue.

In 1990, IBM banned smoking in the building's communal spaces and in its own offices within the building. The IBM Building was still fully occupied, but it had only six tenants; the larger tenants had expanded their space after smaller companies had moved out. IBM was still the largest occupant, with 60% of the space. During the 1990s, the building's other tenants included the architectural firm Perkins&Will, the National Parent Teacher Association, accounting firm Arthur Andersen (which canceled its lease after dissolving in 2002). The IBM Building's public plaza was frequented by skateboarders because of the low security presence there. IBM retrofitted the interior spaces with energy-efficient lighting in 1992, saving $912,000 in energy costs annually. Due to IBM's financial losses, the company downsized its Chicago staff from 9,000 to 4,200 during the early 1990s. This freed up large swaths of office space at the IBM Building. IBM planned to lease out about 100,000 square feet (9,300 m^{2}) by 1993, and the building had 250,000 square feet (23,000 m^{2}) available two years later, being 80% occupied.

IBM was looking to sell the building by 1996; at the time, the company occupied only a quarter of the space and had reduced its Chicago workforce to 800 employees. The Blackstone Group bought the building that August for $130 million after nearly reneging on the purchase due to tax disagreements. Blackstone's ownership lasted just three years, and the values of office buildings in downtown Chicago increased significantly during that time. By 1998, Blackstone wanted to sell the IBM Building and the nearby 225 North Michigan Avenue for a combined $425 million, more than twice the total price Blackstone had paid for the two structures. Prime Group Realty, a company partially owned by Blackstone, offered to purchase the IBM Building as part of a deal involving another building in Cleveland. Prime Group withdrew its offer that September, (Note: Sources disagree on whether the offer was withdrawn due to a dispute over a tenant, or whether it was due to a real-estate downturn.) prompting Blackstone to sue Prime Group to finalize the sale. The lawsuit was dismissed in February 1999 when Prime Group agreed to pay $238 million for the building. Prime Group paid a non-refundable $8 million deposit and sold a portion of 77 West Wacker Drive in late 1999 to finance the remainder of the cost.

==== 2000s ====
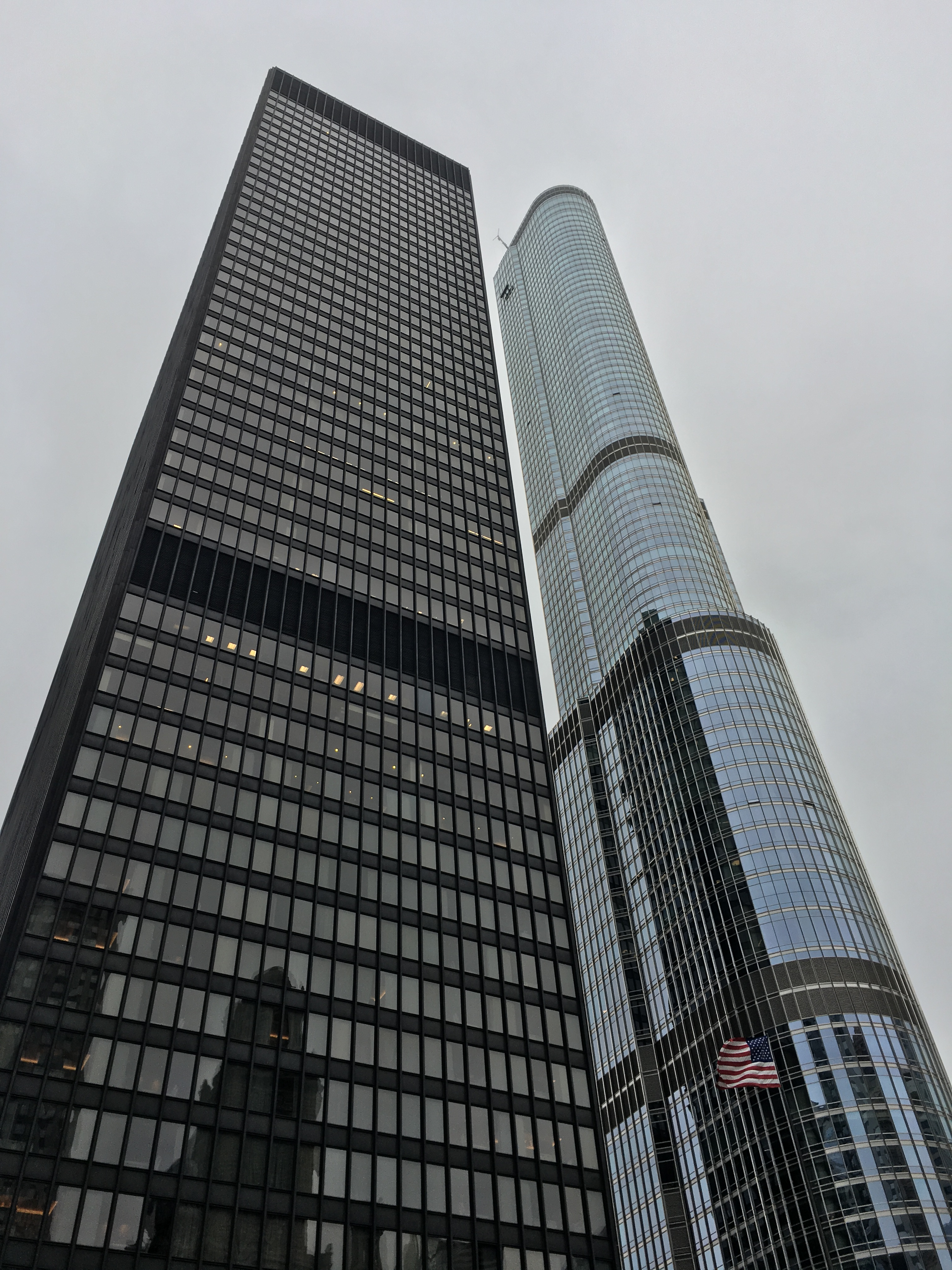
The IBM Building as seen from the south; the Trump Tower is visible at right

In the early 2000s, IBM converted 40,000 square feet (3,700 m^{2}) on two stories into an electronic business briefing center, and the security presence in the lobby was increased in response to the September 11 attacks. By then, the building earned $17.2 million annually from rent revenue. By 2004, IBM's lease of 247,000 square feet (22,900 m^{2}) at 330 North Wabash Avenue was scheduled to expire in two years; at the time, IBM was the building's second-largest tenant. IBM leased space at the Pritzker family's under-construction Hyatt Center, and the Pritzkers paid Prime Group $6.4 million in rent to terminate IBM's lease early. The company finished moving its offices in 2006, leaving a third of the IBM Building vacant. The IBM Building's largest tenant—Jenner & Block, which occupied 340,000 square feet (32,000 m^{2}) under a lease that expired in 2010—was also considering relocating when its lease expired.

Prime Group was acquired early in 2005 by David Lichtenstein's The Lightstone Group, which took control of the IBM Building. After IBM's relocation, Lightstone considered selling off parts of the building as commercial condominiums during mid-2005; at the time, there was very low demand for leased office space in Chicago, which had 26 million square feet (2,400,000 m^{2}) of vacant office space just in its downtown. Mesirow Financial also considered leasing large parts of the building and obtaining its naming rights, but this deal failed to materialize. By then, the IBM Building required extensive renovations, including asbestos abatement. Although its column-free floors could attract potential tenants, the under-construction Trump Tower obstructed eastward views from the building. That September, the owners announced plans to renovate 330 North Wabash Avenue for $130 million. Despite the renovation plans, Jenner & Block did not renew its lease, vacating another 22% of the building. Three other tenants did renew their leases during the next three months.

=== Post-IBM occupancy ===
In 2006, Prime Group proposed converting the lower stories into condominium residences. There would have been amenity spaces on the 2nd floor and 275 apartments on the 3rd through 14th floors; the other floors could be converted to condos at a later date. By then, few companies were relocating to River North, and an increasing number of office buildings in Central Chicago were being converted to residential use. The residential-condominium proposal was canceled because of a decline in demand; in addition, it would have been difficult to market the eastward-facing residences, which were obstructed by the Trump Tower. The building was 57% occupied by late 2006, and the occupancy rate had increased to 70% by the next year when Oracle Corporation leased space there.

==== Split ownership and renovations ====
Prime Group announced in November 2007 that the 2nd through 14th floors would become a luxury hotel; its chief executive Jeff Patterson said that the building was ideal for conversion to a mixed-use hotel and office building. LaSalle Hotel Properties and Oxford Capital Group bought the 2nd through 13th stories for $46 million in March 2008, planning to renovate these floors into 335 hotel rooms. The sale of the lower stories came amid a growing trend in which Chicago buildings were being split between multiple owners. Concurrently, Prime Group planned to upgrade the mechanical systems, restrooms, and elevators in the rest of the building. The hotel plans were paused due to an oversupply of new hotels in Chicago, and correspondingly, low demand for additional rooms. LaSalle sold its 95% stake in the lower stories in December 2010 for $58.8 million. The new owner—Great Eagle Holdings, a parent company of Langham Hospitality Group—planned to open a Langham hotel there in 2012. The renovation was expected to cost $100 million, about half the cost of a brand-new hotel building of similar size. The hotel's opening was anticipated to create 500 jobs; by then, Chicago was seeing an increase in travelers, and several hotels were being developed there.

In December 2011, the American Medical Association (AMA) announced it would move its Chicago offices to 330 North Wabash Avenue, leasing the 39th to 47th floors. AMA bought the building's naming rights as well. Latham & Watkins and SmithBucklin also leased space at the IBM Building within a month of AMA's lease; the three firms' lease commitments totaled approximately 550,000 square feet (51,000 m^{2}). These three leases increased the building's occupancy rate from 47% to approximately 95%, at a time when many Chicago office buildings were struggling to attract tenants. Afterward, the building was renovated for $73.7 million; although the office stories were not intended to be renovated, the hotel plans had triggered a historic-preservation rule that required the entire building to be examined. The project included upgrading mechanical systems, restrooms, corridors, and elevators. It also involved adding a green roof, as well as a conference center, food court, and fitness room. Designers including Mies's grandson Dirk Lohan, the Rockwell Group, and Rottet Studio were hired to convert the lower stories into a Langham hotel. The renovation was partly funded through the Class L designation, a tax incentive given to city landmarks.

The Langham Chicago hotel had a soft opening on July 10, 2013, becoming Langham Hospitality Group's third American hotel. The hotel's Travelle restaurant opened on August 9, operating an outdoor location, Elle on the River, on AMA Plaza's patio during the summertime. The Langham, Chicago, fully opened on September 10 of that year, and the IBM Building was renamed AMA Plaza the same month, when AMA moved there. Langham also proposed installing 11 sculptures in the plaza outside AMA Plaza; the Commission on Chicago Landmarks rejected the initial request, but it eventually allowed the hotel to install the sculptures near the Chicago River. By late 2013, the building was 92% occupied. The building's tenants included Langham, AMA, and Latham & Watkins, as well as engineering firm Thornton Tomasetti, accounting firm BDO USA, and technology firm Outcome Health.

==== Mid-2010s to present ====
LaSalle Investment Management tentatively offered to buy the building in March 2016, forming a joint venture with the China Investment Corporation (CIC). Sources disagree on whether they bid $547 million or $570 million. CIC and LaSalle's purchase was not finalized, for reasons that were not publicly reported. Beacon Capital Partners acquired the office stories and a nearby 902-space parking garage in September 2016 for $467.5 million. The hotel stories were not part of the sale. The sale was finalized that October, and Beacon received a $304 million loan to help finance the purchase. At the time, the building was 96% occupied. After Beacon bought the office stories, it further upgraded the mechanical systems, for which the building received a LEED Gold green building certification. Beacon also hired ESI Design to redesign the underutilized plaza, and ESI added Barcelona chairs to attract visitors. By the late 2010s (before the COVID-19 pandemic), the building had about 3,000 daily workers on average.

During the COVID-19 pandemic, the capacity of the building's elevators was severely restricted to enforce social distancing. By 2021, AMA Plaza had 27 office tenants who paid $30.7 million annually in rent. At the time, the largest tenants were AMA, Latham & Watkins, SmithBucklin, Swanson Martin & Bell, and WeWork. That year, Beacon refinanced the building with a $370 million adjustable-rate mortgage loan. At the time, the building had two conflicting valuations; the Cook County appraiser valued the building at $483.4 million, while the lenders valued it at $550.5 million. The interest rate on the loan increased so much that Beacon's annual loan payment exceeded the building's net income by 2023. The loan was scheduled to mature in June 2024, but the maturity date was postponed by one year. Soon afterward, the loan was sent to a special servicer, since Beacon had missed a loan payment, and there was a concern that Beacon might default on the loan.

The lenders moved to foreclose on the building's loan in November 2024, at which point the offices were 84% occupied; at the time, it was one of the largest-ever foreclosure lawsuits initiated in Chicago. The same year, AMA extended its lease through 2035, while architecture firm Solomon Cordwell Buenz moved in and renovated one floor. By 2025, the office stories were appraised at $208.5 million, a significant decline from their 2022 value. The building was placed for sale in June 2026.

== Architecture ==
AMA Plaza was designed by the office of Ludwig Mies van der Rohe, with Bruno Conterato as the architect in charge. Mies's architectural practice was the project manager and was responsible for the preliminary drawings. C. F. Murphy oversaw the engineering and building plans and was also credited as an associate architect. It is the second-tallest building by Mies (after the Toronto-Dominion Bank Tower at Toronto-Dominion Centre) and was Chicago's third-tallest building when completed. AMA Plaza was the last office building designed by him in the United States, and, of the five office buildings that Mies designed in his eighties, was the only one that was ultimately built. The building was also Mies's final design in Chicago, out of 47 buildings he designed in the city. At the time of its construction, AMA Plaza was the largest office building IBM had ever developed, as well as the company's first skyscraper.

The structure is designed in the International Style and is similar in appearance to Mies's earlier Seagram Building in New York City. AMA Plaza measures 695 feet (212 m) tall from the ground level, with 52 above-ground stories (Note: The building has also been cited as being 48 stories tall.) and two basement levels. Some sources give a different figure of 670 feet (200 m); this is the measurement from the building's plaza, which rises 25 feet (7.6 m) above ground level. Although AMA Plaza's design is largely similar to that of other office buildings in Chicago, some of the design details, such as the exterior curtain wall, differed from other contemporary office buildings.

=== Form and facade ===
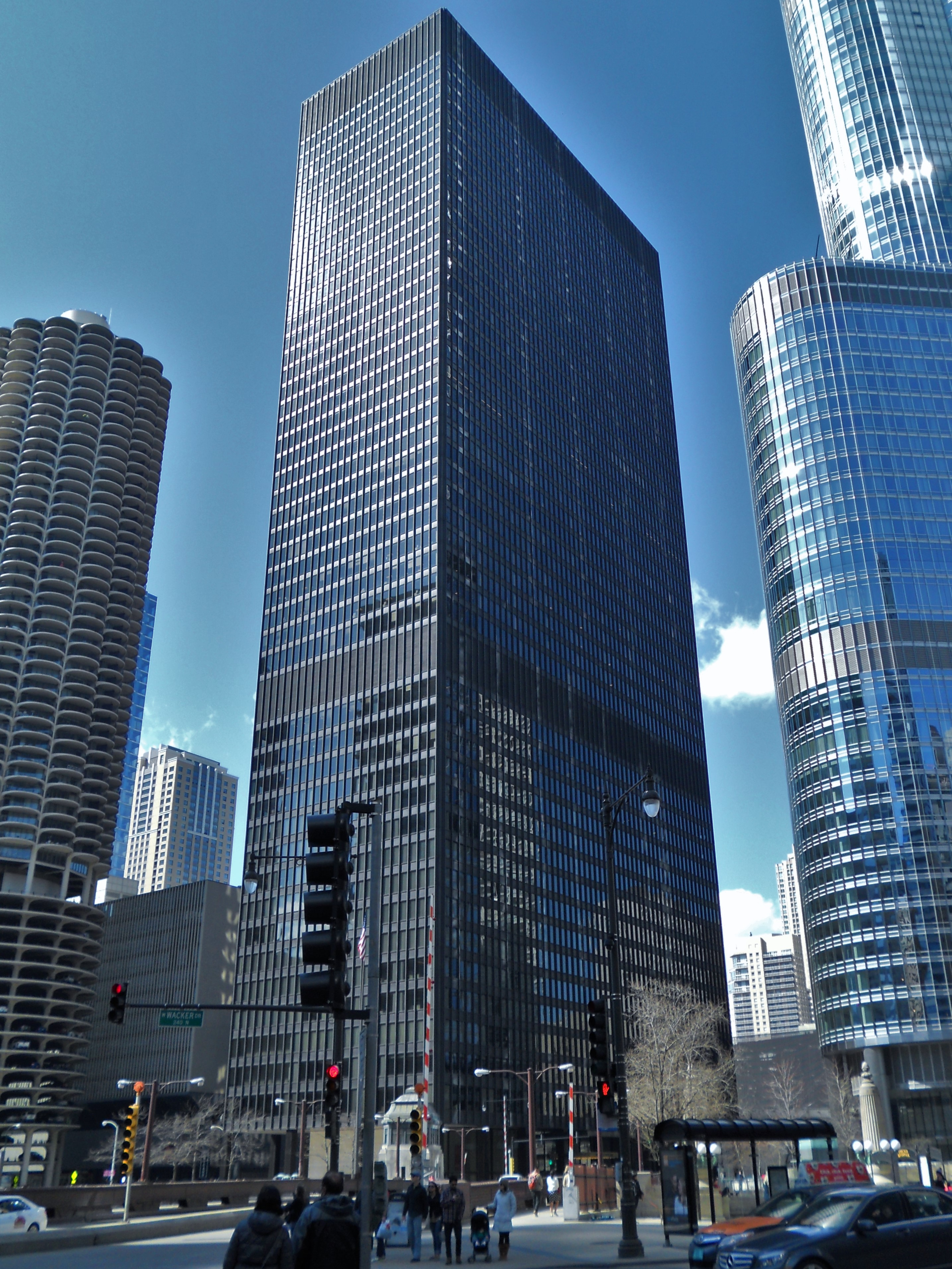
The building, seen from across the Chicago River, with Marina City visible to the left of the tower and Trump International Hotel and Tower visible to the right

AMA Plaza has a rectangular footprint measuring 120 feet (37 m) on its west–east axis and 270 feet (82 m) on its north–south axis, (Note: The three west–east bays sum up to a width of 120 feet (37 m), while the nine north–south bays sum up to a width of 270 feet (82 m). The exterior dimensions of the building are variously cited as 125 by 275 feet (38 by 84 m).) taking up half its site. Its massing consists of a rectangular slab, similar in form to Mies's other skyscraper designs. Because the Chicago River is surrounded by other skyscrapers, and because AMA Plaza's eastern facade is on the same axis as the river, gusts traveling over the Chicago River from the east originally hit the building head-on. Before the Trump Tower was built (deflecting gusts from the east), this created a wind tunnel effect, intensifying gusts that sometimes knocked passersby to the ground. As such, ropes were put out on windy days so pedestrians could traverse the building's plaza.

==== Base ====
The building overhangs the plaza and is supported by bronze-clad columns at its perimeter, forming an arcade in front of the entrance. The overhang on the western and eastern elevations of the facade is around 10–12 feet (3.0–3.7 m) deep, while the overhang on the northern and southern elevations is 30–32 feet (9.1–9.8 m) deep. By leaving the steel columns exposed (as opposed to cladding them), Mies intended to show off the building's superstructure.

The lobby is set back from the rest of the building; its facade consists of narrow aluminum window frames with plate glass panes. The main entrance, which faces east toward Wabash Avenue, consists of three aluminum revolving doors underneath a protruding aluminum marquee. Additional aluminum revolving doors are located at each corner, as well as an automatic door at the northeastern corner. The central portion of the western elevation contains two pairs of double doors. The central portions of the northern and southern elevations have travertine-marble enclosures, which protrude from the lobby facade and contain the emergency-exit staircases.

==== Upper stories ====
Above ground level, each story is nearly identical in design. Although the exterior resembles that of the Seagram Building, AMA Plaza's facade uses anodized aluminum rather than steel. An estimated 1.6 million pounds (730 t) of aluminum was used in the building's construction. The facade's glass curtain wall panes are set within vertical mullions that consist of protruding I-beams; these separate the facade into bays. Mies intended for the I-beams to give texture to the curtain wall, which would have otherwise been flat. The windows on different stories are separated by spandrel panels made of anodized aluminum, each measuring 3.5 by 4 feet (1.1 by 1.2 m) across, with a layer of polyurethane foam behind each spandrel panel to provide insulation. There are aluminum louvers running across the facade at the 16th, 17th, and 52nd stories. The spandrels and mullions were both made by Alcoa and were tinted bronze. There are also geometric patterns at each corner, where the I-beams on different elevations of the facade intersect.

The curtain wall incorporates rectangular glass panes, which are double-layered to provide insulation. The panes are tinted bronze and run from the floor to the ceiling, and each pane is taller than its width. A plastic thermal barrier separates the inner and outer layers of the curtain wall. In addition, there are small openings in the curtain wall to equalize the indoor and outdoor air pressure; these openings are covered with shields. The openings prevented water from being sucked inside the building due to differences in air pressure, an issue that had beset previous buildings with glass curtain walls, since exterior wind forces often caused water to seep through tiny holes in older curtain walls. There are small gutters just behind the curtain wall to catch errant drops of water, and there are panels within the curtain wall for heating–cooling machinery and drapes. The IBM Building was among the first to use double-layered windows, thermal barriers, and pressure equalization in conjunction with each other; previous buildings had used only one or two of these features. The curtain wall was manufactured by the former Crescent Corporation of Crystal Lake, Illinois.

The roof is flat and has a gravel and tar surface, metal flashing, and a walkway running around the perimeter. It is accessed by a staircase dormer at the southern end. When the nearby Trump Tower was built, its 51st-story setback was constructed at the same height as the IBM Building's rooftop. After Beacon acquired the office stories in the 2010s, part of the roof was covered with white panels that reflected sunlight, and a roof garden with vegetables was planted, taking up half the space. In addition, beehives were placed atop the building, which produced honey for the tenants.

=== Structural and mechanical features ===
==== Foundation and superstructure ====
The building weighs 137,500 short tons (122,800 long tons; 124,700 t), excluding its foundation. Due to the muddy ground below, which extends up to 100 feet (30 m) deep, the foundation had to be built using 80 concrete caissons. Of these, 36 are driven into the compacted clay and measure 80 feet (24 m) deep, while the other 44 extend to bedrock and are 112 feet (34 m) deep. The superstructure is a steel frame consisting of columns arranged in a grid, spaced 40 feet (12 m) apart on the west–east axis and 30 feet (9.1 m) apart on the north–south axis. These columns divide the building into three west–east bays and nine north–south bays. On all floors, the center bay on the west–east axis contains a mechanical core with utilities, restrooms, elevators, and stairs; this core measures seven bays along the north–south axis.

==== Mechanical systems ====
When the building was constructed, it was mechanically divided into quadrants, and its mechanical systems were designed to increase its energy efficiency. To help maintain the mechanical systems, IBM kept the original construction drawings and 1,700 construction photographs, and the reception desk in the lobby collected information from throughout the building. A computer called the Building Energy Management System (BEMS) was installed to control the mechanical systems. Among other things, the BEMS monitored the lights on each floor, switched off the lights automatically at night, and controlled dampers that let in air. The interior spaces were initially lit by 45,000 pairs of fluorescent tubes, though some of the lighting had been replaced with LEDs by the 2010s. Doors throughout the building were equipped with keycard sensors, which alerted security personnel in the lobby if an invalid keycard was inserted.

The building also had 32 elevators serving the upper stories (which ran nonstop to one of three separate sets of floors), in addition to four elevators serving the lower stories and two freight elevators. To discourage pranksters from pushing all the call buttons in an elevator, each elevator cab had sensors to measure passengers' weight. This information was used to determine how many passengers were in each cab and, accordingly, how many floors could be called. The IBM Building was Chicago's first structure to incorporate fireman's recall buttons that allowed firefighters to order every elevator to descend to the lobby, overriding the elevators' normal operation; these buttons later became commonplace across the U.S.

The structure was originally heated by seven boilers, and it was cooled using two chillers. An electric heat pump collected excess heat, including tenants' body heat, and transferred it to the perimeter of each floor. Three sensors were mounted on each of the building's four elevations, providing information about outdoor wind, light, and heat conditions. IBM also installed a weather station on the roof, which collected data for the BEMS. Beacon's 2010s renovations added water-saving fixtures to the toilets and sinks. In addition, the original boiler system was replaced with a modular system of pumps and gas boilers, which use 50% less energy than the original boiler system.

=== Interior ===
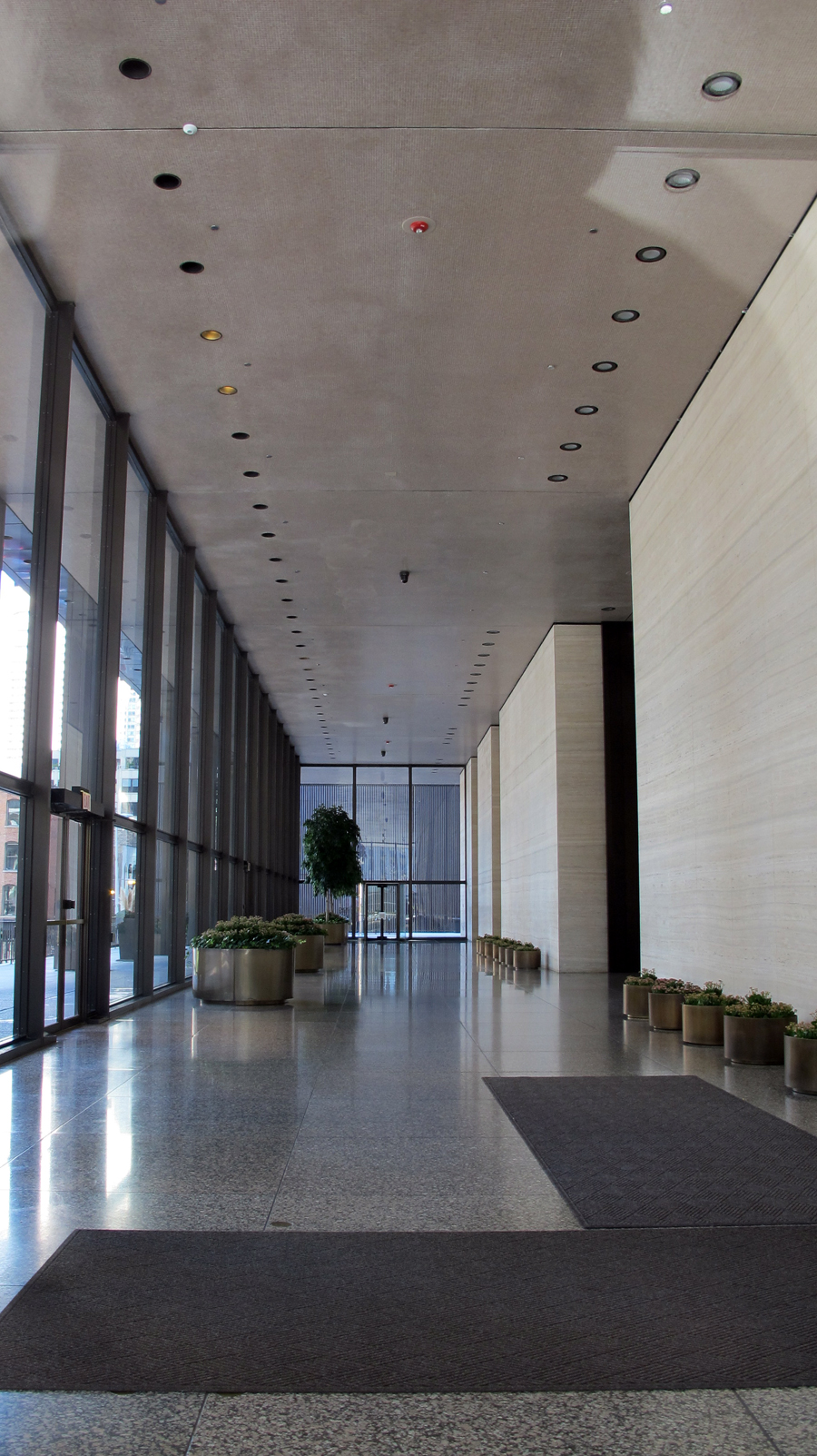
The first-floor entrance lobby

AMA Plaza has a gross floor area of 1,835,360 square feet (170,511 m^{2}), of which approximately 1.2 million square feet (110,000 m^{2}) is used as office space. Originally, the building was cited as having 1.35 million square feet (125,000 m^{2}) of office space. (Note: An Inland Architect article from 1972 cites the building's gross floor area as 1.7 million square feet (160,000 m^{2}) and its rentable space as 1.3 million square feet (120,000 m^{2}).) Above the lobby are 46 stories of usable space, as well as five mechanical stories. (Note: A Chicago Tribune source from 1991 describes the building as having 45 office floors and 7 mechanical floors but does not specify where they are.) There are two mechanical floors above the 16th story and three additional mechanical floors above the 47th story; these have louvers on the facade, instead of windows. There are also two basements with mechanical rooms and parking ramps, both decorated in a utilitarian style. The first (upper) basement also has an electrical-generator room, while the second (lower) basement has storage space and a water-pump room. Since 2013, the 2nd through 13th stories have operated as the Langham Chicago hotel.

==== Lobby ====
AMA Plaza's lobby occupies the entire first floor. The space is described as an example of a Miesian-style lobby, and the materials are similar to those used in the lobbies of Mies's other buildings. As built, the lobby was mostly an open plan space, with a reception desk in its eastern section. Near the reception desk is Marino Marini's bust of Mies van der Rohe. The floor is made of pink granite tiles, similar to the materials used in the plaza. The ceiling measures 26 feet (7.9 m) high; according to Conterato, the design team wanted to create a sense of scale by contrasting the high lobby with the lower ceilings on the upper stories. The ceiling is made of pink mosaic tiles and has recessed lights.

The only interruption to the lobby's open-plan arrangement is in the central bay along the west–east axis, where there are six rectangular enclosures clad in pale travertine marble. These enclosures contain the building's elevators, stairs, and escalators. The travertine panels were selected so that the graining on different panels matched up, giving the impression that they were carved out of the same block of marble. There are five west–east elevator lobbies connecting the western and eastern thirds of the lobby; the elevator lobbies are 10 feet (3.0 m) wide, except for the middle elevator lobby, which is 30 feet (9.1 m) wide. Each elevator lobby provides access to two banks of four elevators, with one bank each on the north and south walls. The elevator doors and elevator call buttons in the lobby are made of bronzed aluminum, while the elevator cabs have wooden paneling inside. In addition, the center two enclosures have stairs and escalators.

With the construction of the Langham, Chicago, glass partitions were installed to separate the lobby into distinct sections serving the hotel and the office stories, and Mies's grandson Dirk Lohan was hired to redesign the hotel's portion of the lobby. The section for the hotel has furniture that is similar in style to pieces that Mies designed during his lifetime. These include a reception desk based on a piece that Mies designed for Edith Farnsworth's residence in Plano, Illinois, as well as seats inspired by couches that Mies designed for his daughter but were never completed.

==== Office stories ====
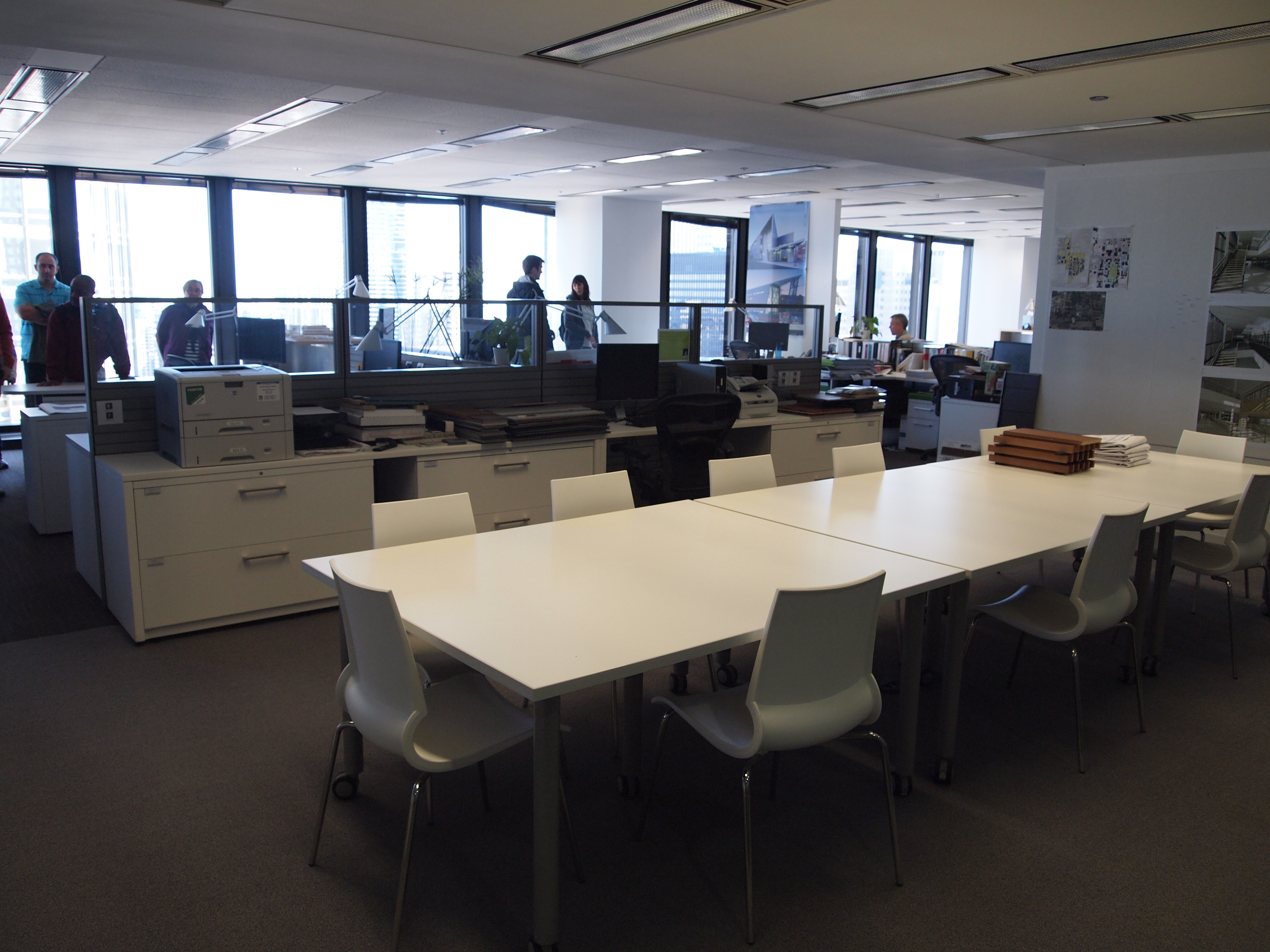
Interior of an office

All of the upper stories have ceilings measuring 13 feet (4.0 m) high. On each of the upper floors, the bathrooms and elevator lobbies are in the core, which is surrounded by a 5-foot-wide (1.5 m) hallway. Each elevator lobby on each story is served by two banks of elevators (one each to the north and south), with tiled or carpeted floors, plastered or paneled walls, and plaster ceilings. The passenger-elevator lobbies and the original elevator call buttons are made of bronzed aluminum. On several stories, there are doors at either end of the elevator lobby, which connect to the hallway that surrounds the core. The freight-elevator lobby has simple painted-metal decorations and concrete-block walls, while the three emergency staircases have simple concrete-and-metal steps, concrete-block walls, and aluminum handrails.

The elevator lobbies are at the center of the building, allowing the remainder of each floor (surrounding the core) to be designed as open-plan office space. The hallways surrounding the core have carpet, tile, or linoleum floors; plaster walls; and dropped acoustic-tile or plaster ceilings. The offices themselves were divided into square modules measuring 5 feet (1.5 m) across. The offices are designed with various architectural finishes and were separated by full-height partition walls. Over the years, various tenants have renovated the upper floors. A bronzed-aluminum escalator from the lobby originally led to a cafeteria on the second floor (now part of the hotel). The landing at the top of the escalator had brown floors and travertine-marble walls, and there was a cafeteria at the northwest corner with tiled floors, dropped ceilings, and drywall partitions. By 2016, the office stories included a conference center, cafe, and fitness center.

==== Hotel ====
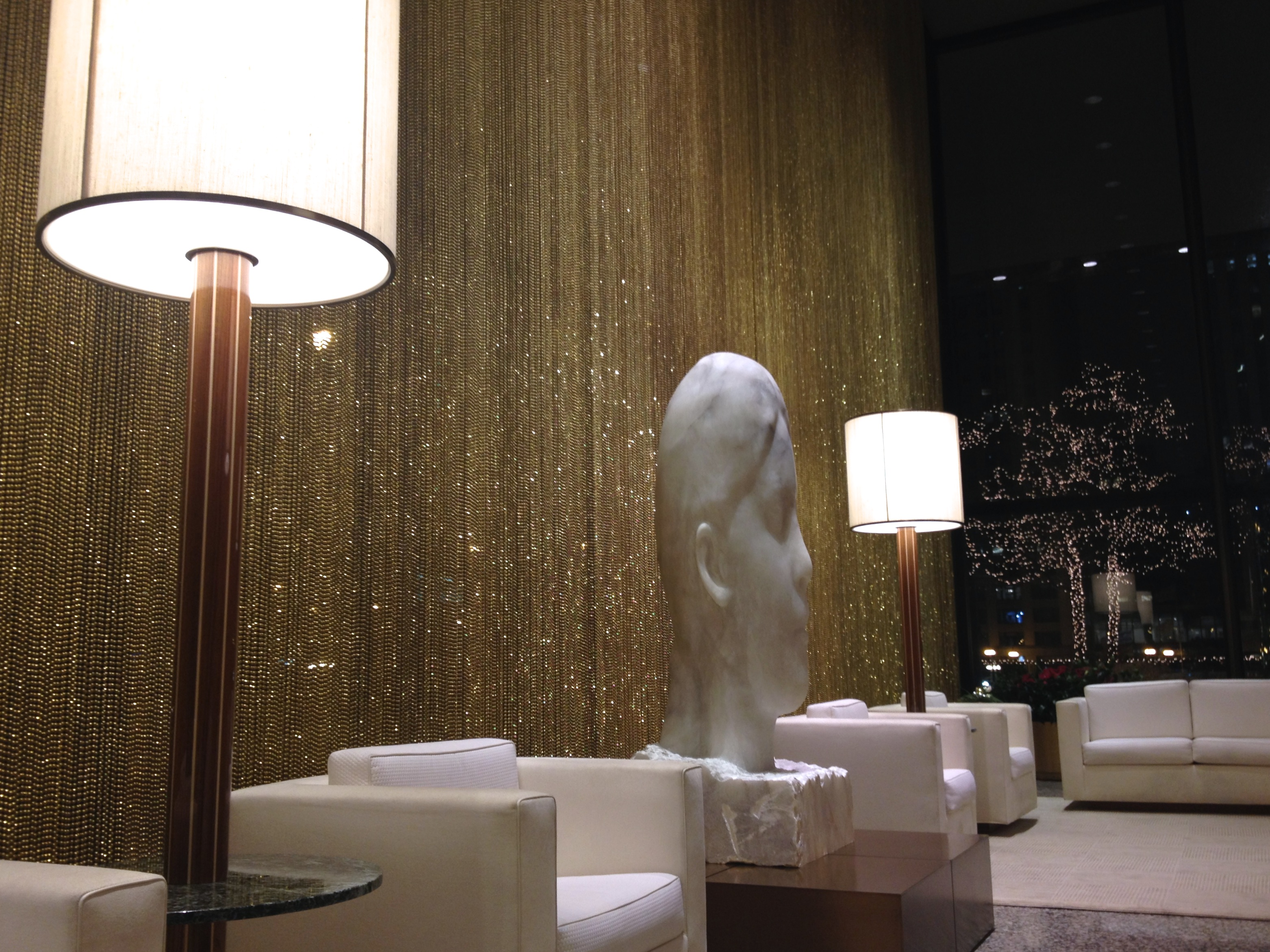
The Langham's 2nd-floor lobby

The Langham hotel on the 2nd through 13th floors has 316 guest units, of which 268 are classified as rooms and 48 are suites. The Rockwell Group designed a restaurant in the hotel, while Richmond International designed the guestrooms. Rottet Studio designed the event spaces and also picked out the artwork, which included various pieces of modern art. Anish Kapoor and Jaume Plensa, who respectively designed the Cloud Gate and Crown Fountain sculptures in nearby Millennium Park, were hired to furnish art for the hotel, which Rottet Studio designer Lauren Rottet called "Bauhaus derivative". Katherine Lo of Langham Hospitality selected the artwork on the guestroom stories, including photographs, sculptures, and paintings.

The hotel's main lobby is on the second floor due to space constraints at ground level. The second-floor lobby has a glass artwork on the ceiling, which consists of 6,000 glass pieces. Also situated on the second floor is the Travelle restaurant, which serves Mediterranean-influenced cuisine and is designed to resemble 1960s corporate architecture. Travelle includes a 10-seat wine room, a glass-walled kitchen, and a bar in one corner. On the same story is the Pavilion, which has a 65-person capacity and serves afternoon tea. It is designed in a similar fashion to the German Pavilion that Mies designed for the 1929 International Exposition in Barcelona.

The hotel's event spaces cover 15,000 square feet (1,400 m^{2}) and has ten meeting spaces, including the 4,880-square-foot (453 m^{2}) Devonshire Ballroom and the 2,639-square-foot (245.2 m^{2}) Cambridge Room. On the fourth story is a spa called the Chuan Spa, which covers 22,000 square feet (2,000 m^{2}) and includes facilities such as locker rooms, hot tubs, massage rooms. The health club contains a swimming pool measuring 67 feet (20 m) long. There is also a movie-screening room with 12 seats. The hotel's 13th story includes 32 rooms in addition to a 4,000-square-foot (370 m^{2}) lounge called the Langham Club, which is used for weddings. Due to fears of the number thirteen, Langham Hospitality labels the 13th story as floor number 12C.

The guestroom floors have Bauhaus decorations such as travertine floors, travertine hardware, hardwood wall panels, and chandeliers. The rooms each cover at least 516 square feet (47.9 m^{2}); some of the rooms are classified as Club Rooms, whose occupants can access a private lounge. The largest suites each have two bedrooms and two bathrooms, spanning 2,700 square feet (250 m^{2}). One suite is known as the Regent Suite and has a tub and fireplace, while the other is called the Infinity Suite and has a grand piano. Each guestroom is decorated in one of two color palettes and has a simple design inspired by Mies's architecture. There are geometric furniture, marble and granite surfaces, bronze decorative details, and separate dressing areas. The guestrooms receive natural light from the full-height windows on the facade, and they have automatic lighting control systems and large televisions. Transparent and opaque smart glass panels separate the sleeping areas from the bathrooms, which have travertine floors and white-granite sinks. Due to historic-preservation restrictions, the rooms have dropped ceilings that conceal air-conditioning ducts, and the partition walls do not touch the facade.

== Impact ==
=== Reception ===
When the IBM Building was completed, the Chicago Tribune wrote that the lobby had an open feeling and that the building was Mies's "last expression of the purity of form which set the standards of the design of modern office towers". Stanley Abercrombie of Architecture Plus wrote that the building was "an excellent demonstration" of the improvements made in the design of glass towers, which previously had been seen as examples of banal, energy-efficient structures. The Jersey Journal wrote in 1984 that the IBM Building, along with Mies's Federal Center, were examples of "ultimate" skyscrapers that Mies designed in Chicago. A New York Times writer contrasted the "cool, calm" IBM Building with the setback form of the nearby Wrigley Building and the honeycomb-like facade of Marina City. By contrast, the writer Kenneth Halpern criticized the fact that the city's zoning laws allowed the IBM Building to be built in the first place, saying that the building blocked eastward views from Marina City. Paul Goldberger of The New York Times wrote in 1983 that it seemed as though Mies "ignored the complexities of the unusual site, and dropped a box as if from the sky above" when designing the IBM Building, though he regarded it as a good example of IBM's "earnest, cautious assemblage" of architectural works.

Blair Kamin of the Chicago Tribune wrote in 2001 that the IBM Building had an air of "black-tie elegance". When the Langham hotel opened, the Condé Nast Traveler wrote that the building "is about as iconic as Chicago architecture can get", and the Chicago Tribune called it "a starkly rectilinear monolith". A writer for Curbed called it a "monolithic, no-nonsense tower". Reviewers for the Condé Nast Traveler and Forbes Travel Guide wrote that the Langham, Chicago's design included copious references to the building's architecture and Mies's design philosophy. A Financial Times writer said that AMA Plaza's status as a "minimalist monolith in grey-tinted glass" contrasted with the round towers of Marina City and the glass facade of the Trump Tower, while The New York Times said the building encapsulated Mies's belief that "less is more".

The building's Langham Hotel has also received commentary. The New York Times wrote in 2014 that the hotel overcame "the building's corporate feel to provide an elegant, tasteful stay", while the Forbes Travel Guide said it "reflects the centuries-old heritage and European hospitality sensibilities" of the original Langham Hotel, London. A writer for The Globe and Mail said of the hotel's design, "Between the Botticino Fiorito marble and the Alaskan white granite, you could build your own Acropolis."

=== Landmark designations ===
As early as 1982, a panel of preservationists interviewed by the Chicago Tribune had identified the IBM Building as a potential city landmark. The head of the Commission on Chicago Landmarks at the time, Ira Bach, called the building Mies's "finest" design. In November 2007, in advance of the hotel conversion, the Commission on Chicago Landmarks voted to recommend designating 330 North Wabash Avenue as a Chicago Landmark. At the time, it was the city's youngest landmark and only the seventh mid-20th-century building to gain Chicago Landmark designation. The landmark designation was finalized on February 6, 2008, and a plaque related to this designation is mounted outside the building. The Chicago Landmark designation also made the building temporarily eligible for property-tax reductions, but restricted the extent to which the building could be modified.

Because of the significance of its modern-style architecture, the structure was also added to the National Register of Historic Places in March 2010, making it one of the youngest NRHP listings in the nation. Though NRHP listings were generally required to be at least 50 years old, 330 North Wabash Avenue was only 38 years old at the time of listing. However, the IBM Building was listed ahead of the 50-year cutoff because it met a criterion for "exceptional importance".

=== Awards and influence ===
When the IBM Building was completed, Mies van der Rohe's office and C. F. Murphy Associates jointly received an award from the American Iron and Steel Institute. It also received an energy-efficiency award in 1975 from the Federal Energy Association. After AMA Plaza's 2014 renovation, the Commission on Chicago Landmarks gave an architectural-honor award to the building, celebrating the adaptive reuse of the lower stories and the restoration of the upper stories. The building also received a LEED Gold green building certification after being upgraded to meet modern energy standards. U.S. News & World Report first ranked the building's Langham hotel as the United States' best hotel in 2017. In addition, the Langham, Chicago, has been ranked on Tripadvisor's list of the best American hotels, as well as the Condé Nast Traveler's Gold List of the best hotels worldwide.

The IBM Building was used as a filming location in the 2008 film The Dark Knight, where it was depicted as the location of Wayne Enterprises's boardroom and the Gotham City mayor's office. The building has also been depicted in the 2000 film High Fidelity, and its roof was replicated for the shooting of the 1998 film Mercury Rising. The conversion of the lower stories to hotel use was also documented in the 2014 book Last is More. The building's architecture inspired several similarly styled structures such as the John Hancock Center and Willis Tower. Eduardo Souto de Moura, who won the Pritzker Architecture Prize in 2011, specifically cited the design of the IBM Building as an influence for some of his work.

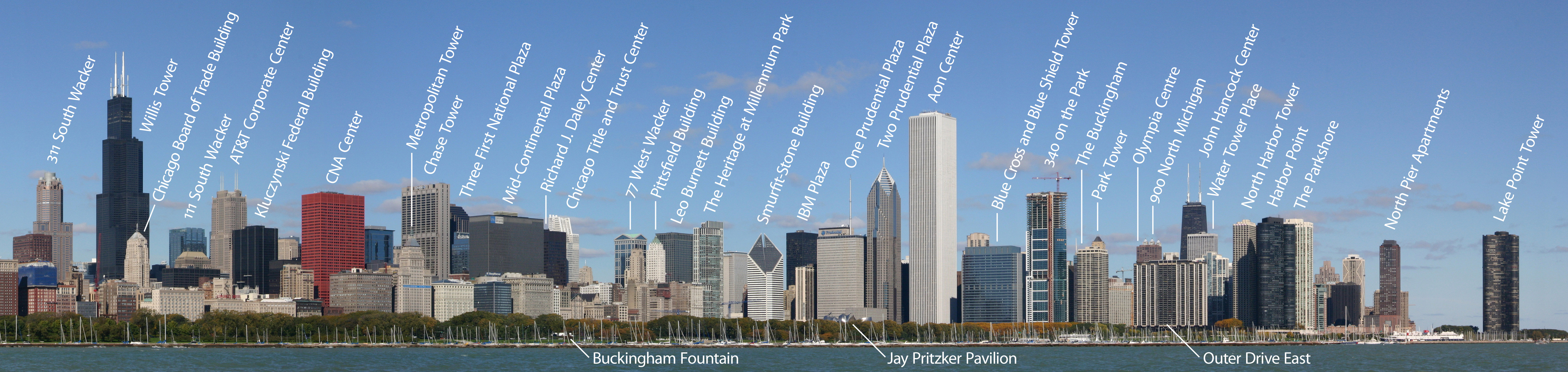

== See also ==
- National Register of Historic Places listings in Central Chicago
- List of tallest buildings in Chicago
- List of tallest buildings in the United States
