= Birney (disambiguation) =

A Birney is a small streetcar. See also: Birney (Toronto streetcar).

'Birney may also refer to:

== Places ==
- Birney, Montana, United States

== People ==
- Alice Birney (1858–1907), American educator
- David Birney (1939–2022), American actor/director
- David B. Birney (1825–1864), American businessman, lawyer and Union Army General
- Earle Birney (1904–1995), Canadian poet and novelist
- Ewan Birney (born 1972), executive director of the European Molecular Biology Laboratory
- Jack Birney (1927–1995), Australian barrister and politician
- James G. Birney (1792–1857), American abolitionist, politician and attorney
- James M. Birney (1817–1888), American lawyer, newspaper publisher and politician
- Matt Birney (born 1969), Australian former politician
- Reed Birney (born 1954), American actor
- William Birney (1819–1907), American Union Army general
