= Hannah Kent Schoff =

American social worker and reformer (1853-1940)

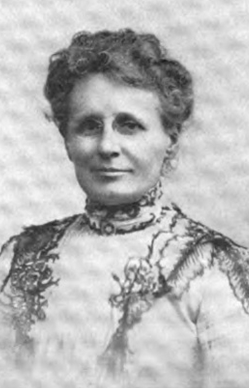
- Hannah Kent Schoff from a 1903 publication.
- Born: Hannah Kent; June 3, 1853; Upper Darby Township, Pennsylvania, USA
- Died: December 10, 1940 (aged 87); Philadelphia, Pennsylvania, USA
- Known for: president of the National Congress of Mothers
- Spouse: Frederic Schoff (m. 1873–1922)
- Children: 7

Hannah Kent Schoff (née Hannah Kent; June 3, 1853 – December 10, 1940) was an American welfare worker and reformer. She was influential in state and was a "National Child Welfare" and "Juvenile Criminal" legislation in the late 19th and early 20th centuries.

== Early life ==
Kent was born on June 3, 1853, in Upper Darby Township, Pennsylvania, to woolen manufacturer Thomas and Fanny Kent. She was the eldest of five children and received an education from both private and church schools. On October 23, 1873, she married engineer Frederick Schoff, with whom she would raise seven children.

== Career ==
In the 1800s, Kent Schoff rose up the ladder within the National Congress of Mothers. She first became a project manager but was eventually promoted to vice president for a three-year term. She also founded the Pennsylvania Congress of Mothers in 1899 and became its first president until 1902.

While in these leadership positions, Kent Schoff began to read news articles of youth tried and jailed as adults in the Pennsylvania area. She was specifically interested in a case from May 1899, regarding an eight-year-old girl sentenced to the House of Refuge for arson. This sparked her to lead a campaign to establish a Juvenile court system. She lobbied for states to follow the recently passed Illinois Juvenile Court Law, which mandated that youths be held in houses, not detentions while awaiting trials, regular checkups, and a mandated police officer watching over them.

After taking over presidency of the National Congress of Mothers from Alice Birney, Kent Schoff persuaded President Theodore Roosevelt to endorse the Juvenile court system and was the first woman to speak in front of Canadian Parliament on this topic. She also established a National Endowment Fund to sustain the organization, established the Home Education Division within the U. S. Bureau of Education, and created the first national magazine called the National Parent Teacher. In 1908, the first International Congress on the Welfare of the Child was held under the sponsorship of the National Congress of Mothers and Parent-Teacher Associations. In 1913, she was appointed director of the Home Education Division within the U. S. Bureau of Education. Before her resignation in 1920, Kent Schoff changed the name of the organization to the National Congress of Mothers and Parent-Teacher Associations.

While the organization supported the suffragist movement, Kent Schoff firmly believed in a women's power within the home.

Kent Schoff died on December 12, 1940.

== Selected publications ==
The following is a list of selected publications:

- The history of the juvenile court movement in Pennsylvania (1903)
- Education for child nurture and home making outside of schools (1915)
- The Wayward Child: a study of the causes of crime (1915)
- Education in the home (1916)
- Wisdom of the ages in bringing up children (1933)
