= Dirk Lohan =

American architect (born 1938)

- Born: 1938 (age 87–88); Rathenow, Brandenburg, Germany
- Occupation: Architect
- Buildings: McDonald's former headquarters
- Projects: Renovation of Soldier Field

Dirk Lohan (born 1938, Rathenow, Germany) is an American architect and principal partner at Lohan Architecture.

His own works include McDonald's former Corporate Headquarters campus in Oak Brook, the John G. Shedd Oceanarium and the Soldier Field stadium expansion and renovation.

He is known as the continuator of the work of his grandfather, Ludwig Mies van der Rohe, and an expert on its conservation. He is also one of the main characters of the comic Mies by Agustín Ferrer Casas, where he accompanies his grandfather on a trip to Europe and Mies van der Rohe speaks with him about his life and work during the flight.

== Biography ==
Lohan was born in Germany, but moved to Chicago to attend the Illinois Institute of Technology, where he studied under his grandfather, Ludwig Mies van der Rohe. Lohan's childhood home in post war Germany was filled with photographs of his grandfather's buildings, and Lohan developed an early fascination with architecture. As a teenager, he made a personal connection to Mies' work, particularly the 860–880 Lake Shore Drive Apartments in Chicago. He studied architecture with his grandfather and joined the Mies office in 1962, working on projects like the New National Gallery in West Berlin and the Chicago IBM office building. After Mies' death in 1969, Lohan continued the firm with several partners, and removed Mies' name from the firm within five years, as stipulated by his estate. While early in his career, he worked on various projects, including the design of the McDonald's headquarters in Oak Brook, Illinois.

He played a role in the design and renovation of Soldier Field in Chicago, the Adler Planetarium, and the Shedd Aquarium. He also was a founding member of the Chicago School of Architecture Foundation, created to purchase and save the Glessner House, designed by H.H. Richardson.

== Style ==
Lohan's architectural style is influenced by his grandfather's work but is distinct in its approach. While Mies van der Rohe was known for his minimalist, rigid designs, Lohan incorporates a greater focus on human comfort and warmth. He often uses warmer materials compared to the cooler, more austere elements favored by Mies.
