= National Parent Teacher Association =

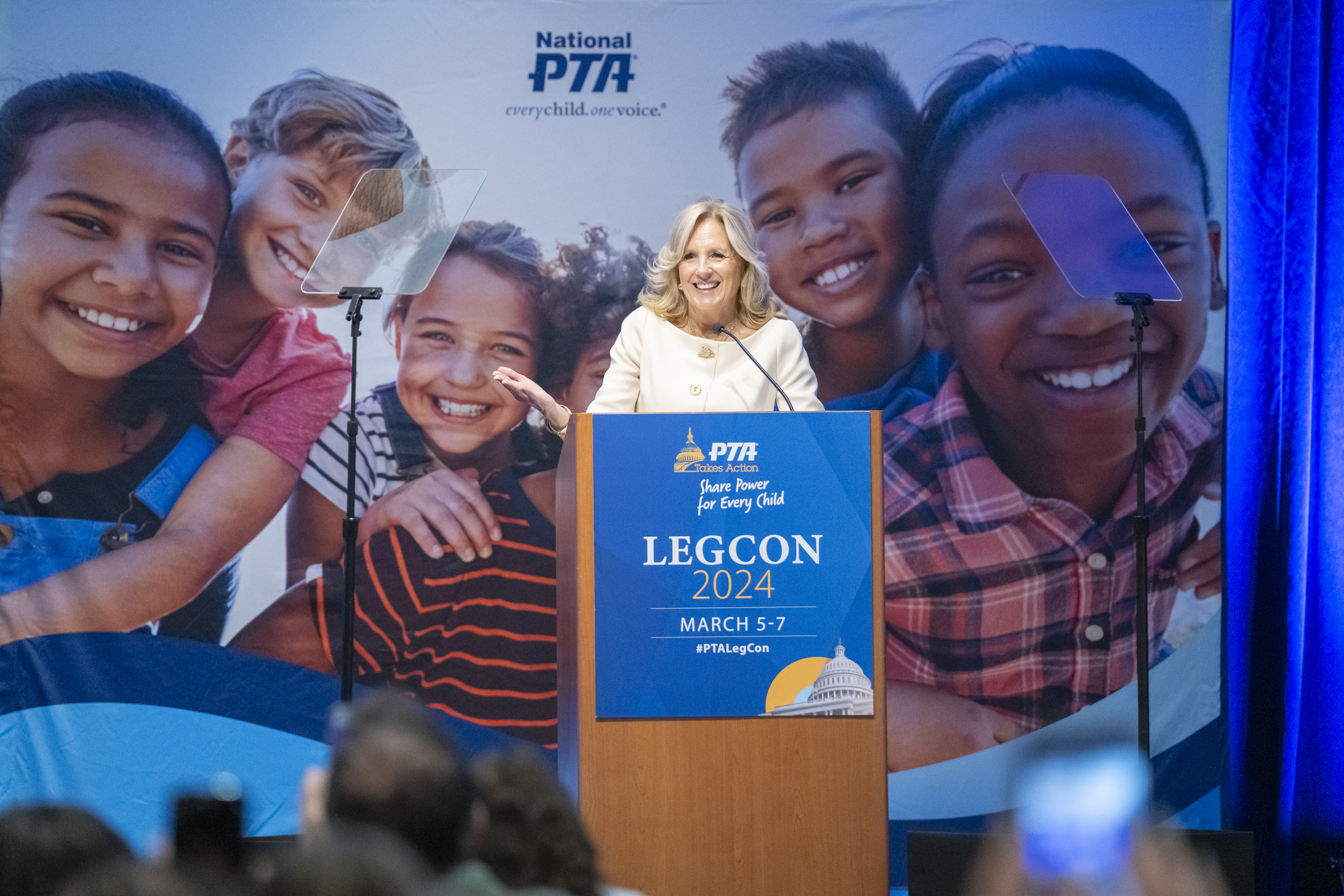
- U.S. First Lady Jill Biden speaking at the National Parent Teacher Association Legislative Conference in 2024.
- Abbreviation: PTA
- Formation: 17 February 1897; 129 years ago (as National Congress of Mothers); Washington, D.C., US
- Headquarters: Alexandria, Virginia, U.S.
- Location: United States
- Board of directors: Howie Berman, MA, CAE executive director
- Key people: Yvonne Johnson, President
- Affiliations: Education International
- Website: pta.org

The National Parent Teacher Association (National PTA) is a non-profit organization based in Alexandria, Virginia. Founded in 1897 as the National Congress of Mothers, the National PTA advocates for public policy reforms related to education.

There are 54 state-level PTA congresses: one for each of the 50 U.S. states, the District of Columbia, the U.S. Virgin Islands, Puerto Rico, and Europe (military families, through the U.S. Department of Defense). There are 23,000 local organizations recognized by the National PTA in the United States.

== History ==
The National Parent Teacher Association was founded on 17 February 1897, in Washington, D.C., as the National Congress of Mothers by Alice McLellan Birney and Phoebe Apperson Hearst at a meeting of over 2,000 parents, teachers, workers, and legislators. In 1908, the organization changed its name to the National Congress of Mothers and Parent-Teacher Associations..

Alice Birney's original vision coupled with Phoebe Hearst's (wife of California U.S. Senator George Hearst and mother of publisher William Randolph Hearst) social and financial assistance came together in a burst of synergy that drew 2,000 people from across the country to discuss the issues affecting their children at a three-day event. The National Congress of Mothers quickly fanned out into a grassroots organization at national, state, and local levels.

- In 1908, the organization delegates voted to change its name to the National Congress of Mothers and Parent-Teacher Associations.
- In 1910, charter and board member, Mary Grinnell Mears, moved that "Founders Day be observed every February 17th of the year…"
- In 1925, the association adopted the name the National Congress of Parents and Teachers.
- In 1926, National PTA President Mrs. A. H. Reeve helped set up the National Congress of Colored Parents and Teachers to function in the District of Columbia and states where separate schools for the races were maintained, so that African-American children might have PTA service. On 7 May, the National Congress of Colored Parents and Teachers was formed.
- In 1966, the National PTA registered the terms PTA and Parent-Teacher Association as service marks with the U.S. government.
- In 1970, the National Congress of Parents and Teachers (National PTA) and the National Congress of Colored Parents and Teachers (NCCPT)—founded by Selena Sloan Butler in Atlanta, Georgia—merged to serve all children.

== Advocacy ==
The National Congress of Mothers, now known as the National Parent Teacher Association, became a grassroots organization that influenced the local, state, and national levels. Pamphlets written on how to organize "parents' auxiliaries" in public schools and offer suggestions on formation and meeting were distributed. Collections of loaned materials on child-development and parenting skills were made available to parents.

The PTA has helped institute countless changes, from the institution of school lunch and inoculation programs to the institution of child labor laws to the promotion of transportation safety, sex education, and tobacco and alcohol education.

National PTA's annual public policy agenda outlines policy priorities and recommendations for Congress. The priorities are selected based on the timeliness of issue, opportunities for National PTA to provide leadership and expertise to Congress, alignment to National PTA's mission and resolution and ability to achieve a meaningful policy change that will produce positive results for children and their families

Examples include:

- Creation of kindergarten classes
- Child labor laws
- Public health service
- Hot and healthy lunch programs
- Juvenile justice system
- Mandatory immunization
- Arts in Education
- School Safety
- Special education
- Education Funding
- Early Childhood Education
- Elementary and Secondary Education
- Child nutrition

=== Programs ===
- The Reflections Arts in Education Program is a preschool-12th grade national art contest program, often featuring school-wide displays at schools with PTAs. It was founded in 1969 by Mary Lou Anderson.

== Our Children magazine ==
The first issue of National Parent Teacher Association's Our Children magazine, then named The National Congress of Mothers Magazine was printed in November 1906. The purpose of the magazine was to voice the National PTA's ambitions and to spread the word of its work and mission.

The magazine's title was changed in December 1909 to Child Welfare as this was the organization's main concern at the time. By the 1930s, the magazine then featured longer articles by leading experts in fields such as education, health and child welfare. Starting in September 1934, the magazine received another makeover where it was published in an oversized format and renamed as the National Parent-Teacher, "to more definitely associate the publication with the parent–teacher movement."

More changes came in 1961 with another new name—The PTA Magazine—under the editorial leadership of Eva Grant. She led the magazine to its period of widest influence and greatest circulation from 1939 to 1972. During that time, the magazine featured prominent regular contributors such as J. Edgar Hoover and Margaret Mead.

In 1975, The PTA Magazine was replaced by PTA Today, publication that evolved from the former National PTA Bulletin and initially appeared in tabloid form for its first three years. Eventually, PTA Today returned to a typical magazine format that was circulated mostly to local PTA units and kept them abreast of National PTA events and programs and provided parenting information.

The final major makeover took place in September 1995 when it was made more colorful and became Our Children in line with the founders' theme of the first convention that "All Children Are Our Children". In recent years, Our Children was published bi-monthly, five times per year and distributed to local and state PTA presidents, state PTA board members, state office personnel and a limited number of paid subscribers.

In fall 2015, Our Children moved to a digital online format geared towards parents. It is now a monthly online publication, with one print edition distribution in the spring.
