= State Street Bridge (Chicago) =

Bridge in Chicago, Illinois, U.S.

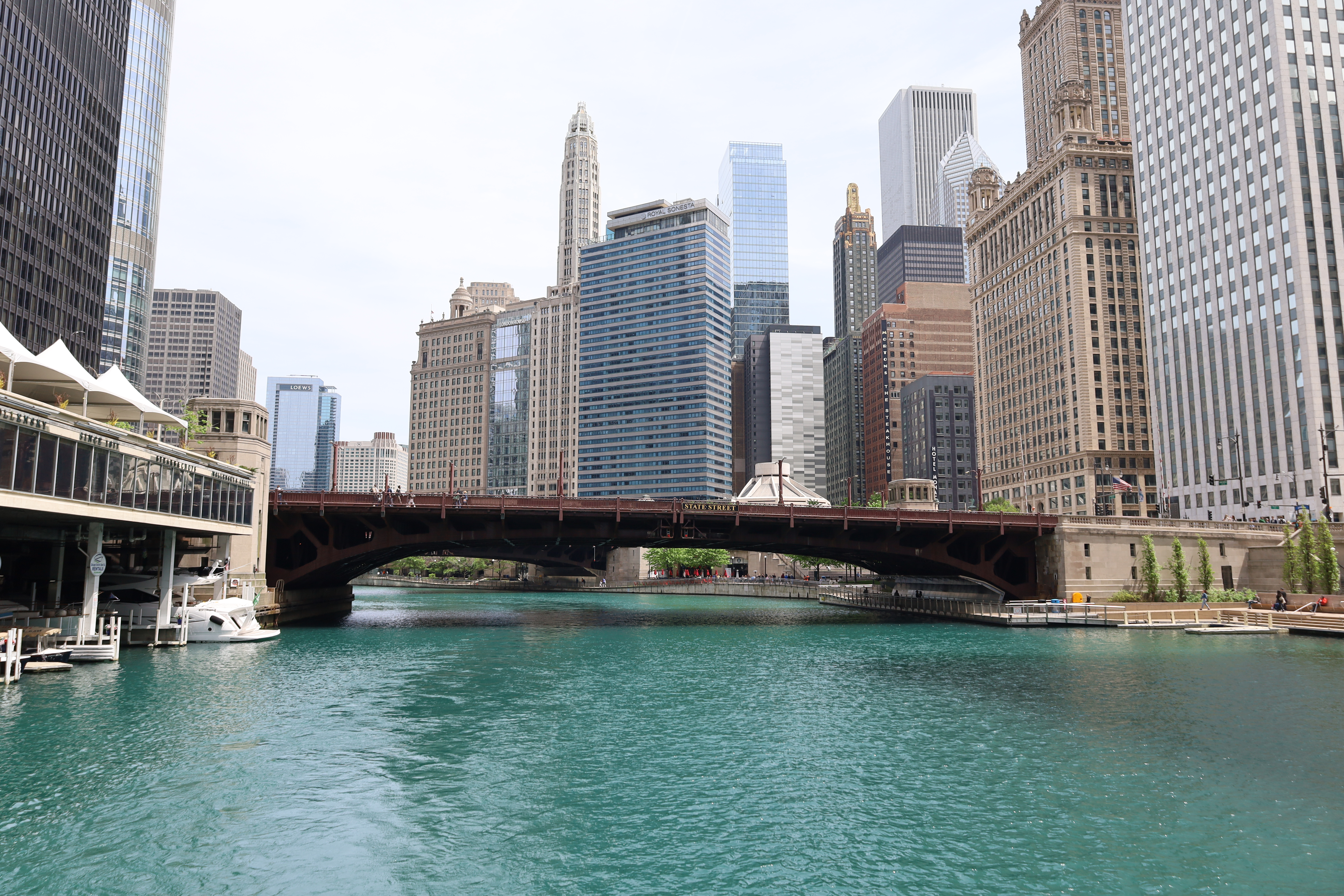
- The bridge in 2023
- Coordinates: 41°53′15″N 87°37′41″W

History
- Construction start: 1939
- Construction end: 1949

Location
- Interactive map of State Street Bridge

The State Street Bridge, officially named the Bataan-Corregidor Memorial Bridge is a bridge that carries State Street across the Chicago River in downtown Chicago, Illinois, United States.

== History ==
The current bridge was started in 1939, but material shortages in World War II caused a delay in completion until 1949.

Beginning on April 28, 2025, the bridge was entirely closed for months-long emergency repairs, which were initially expected to be completed in November. However, project completion was delayed to an undetermined date. On March 25, 2026, the Chicago Department of Transportation announced that the bridge will reopen on March 27, 2026.

== Gallery ==
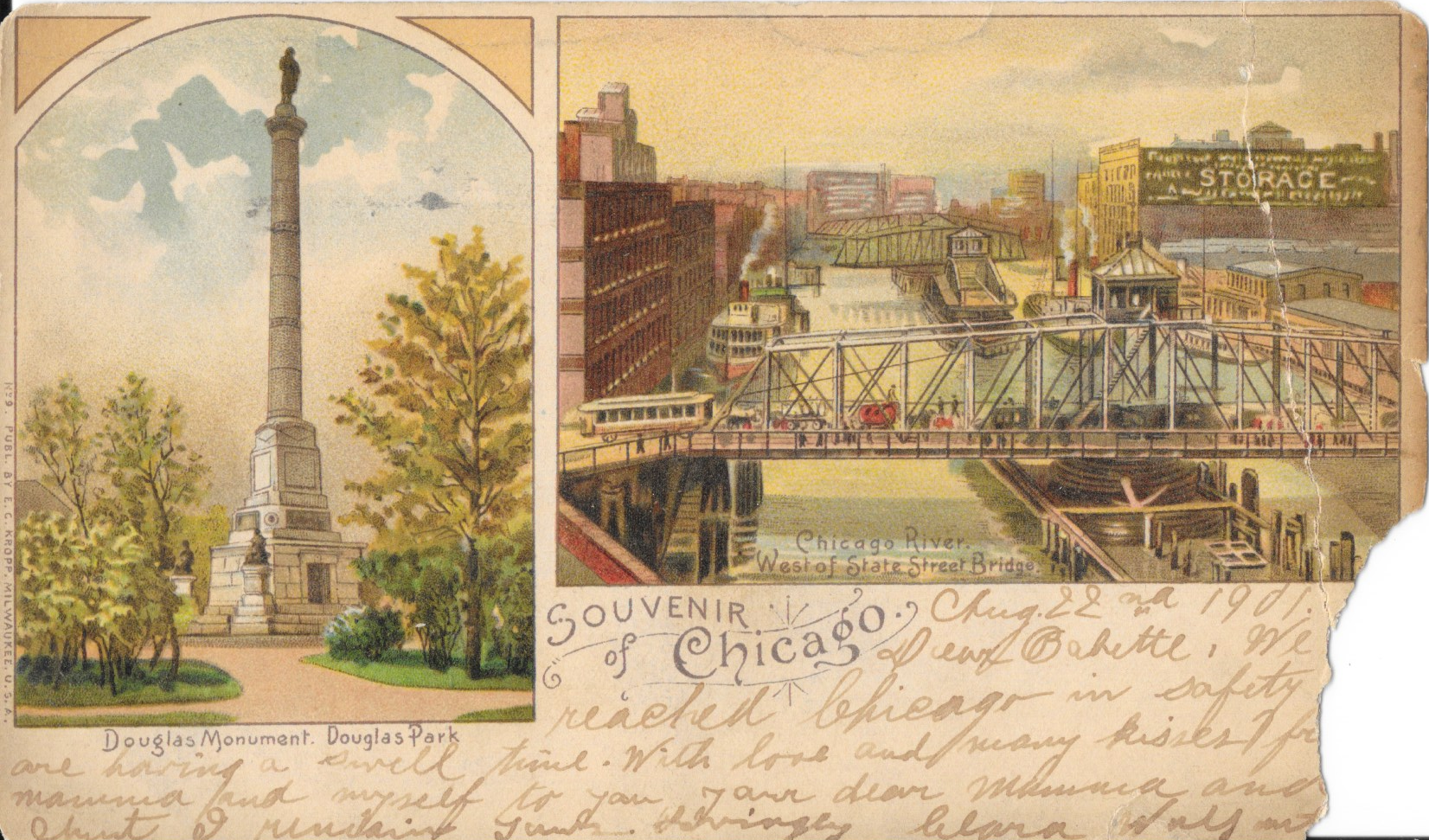
Postcard of bridge circa 1901

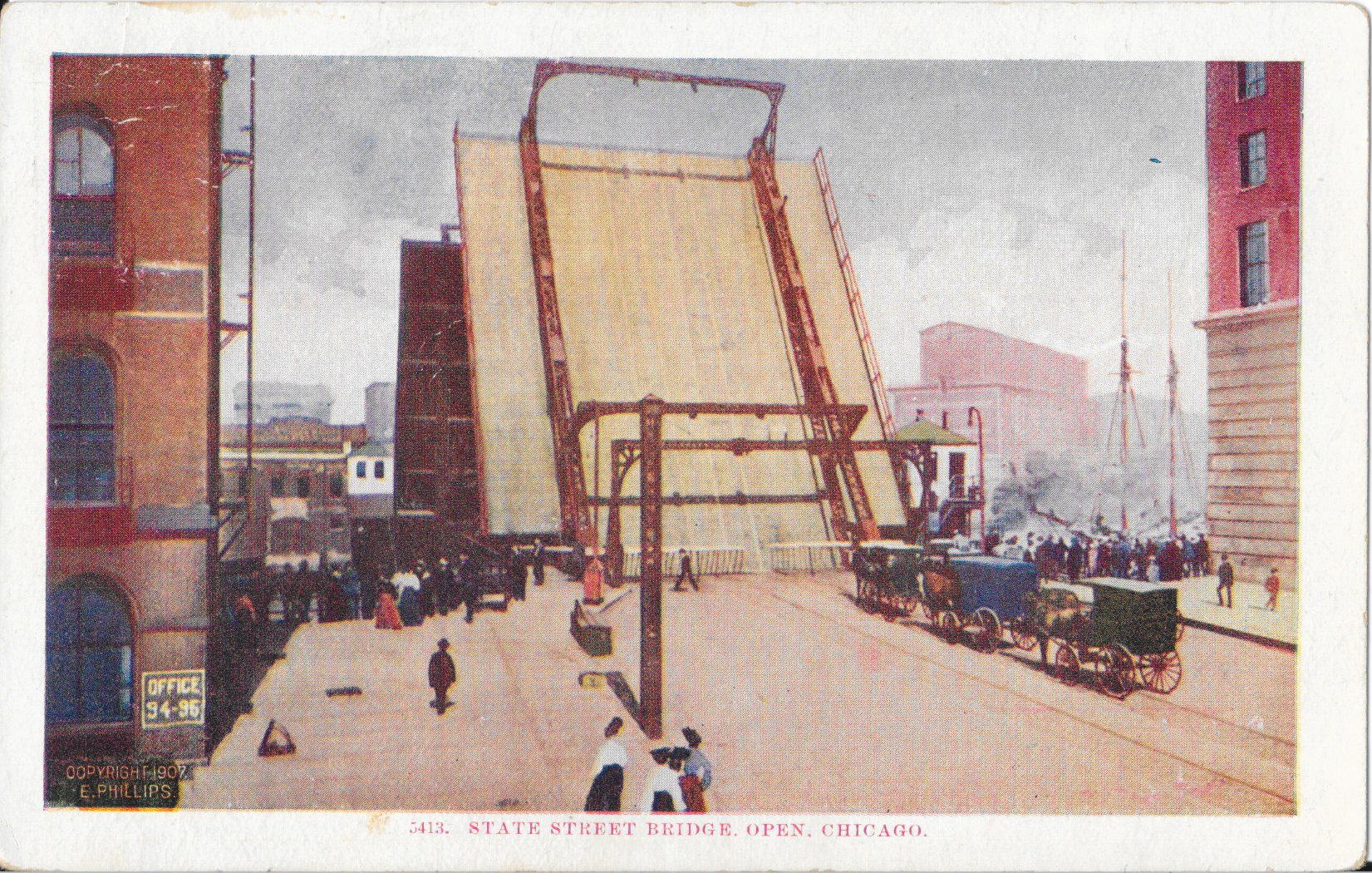
Postcard of the bridge circa 1908

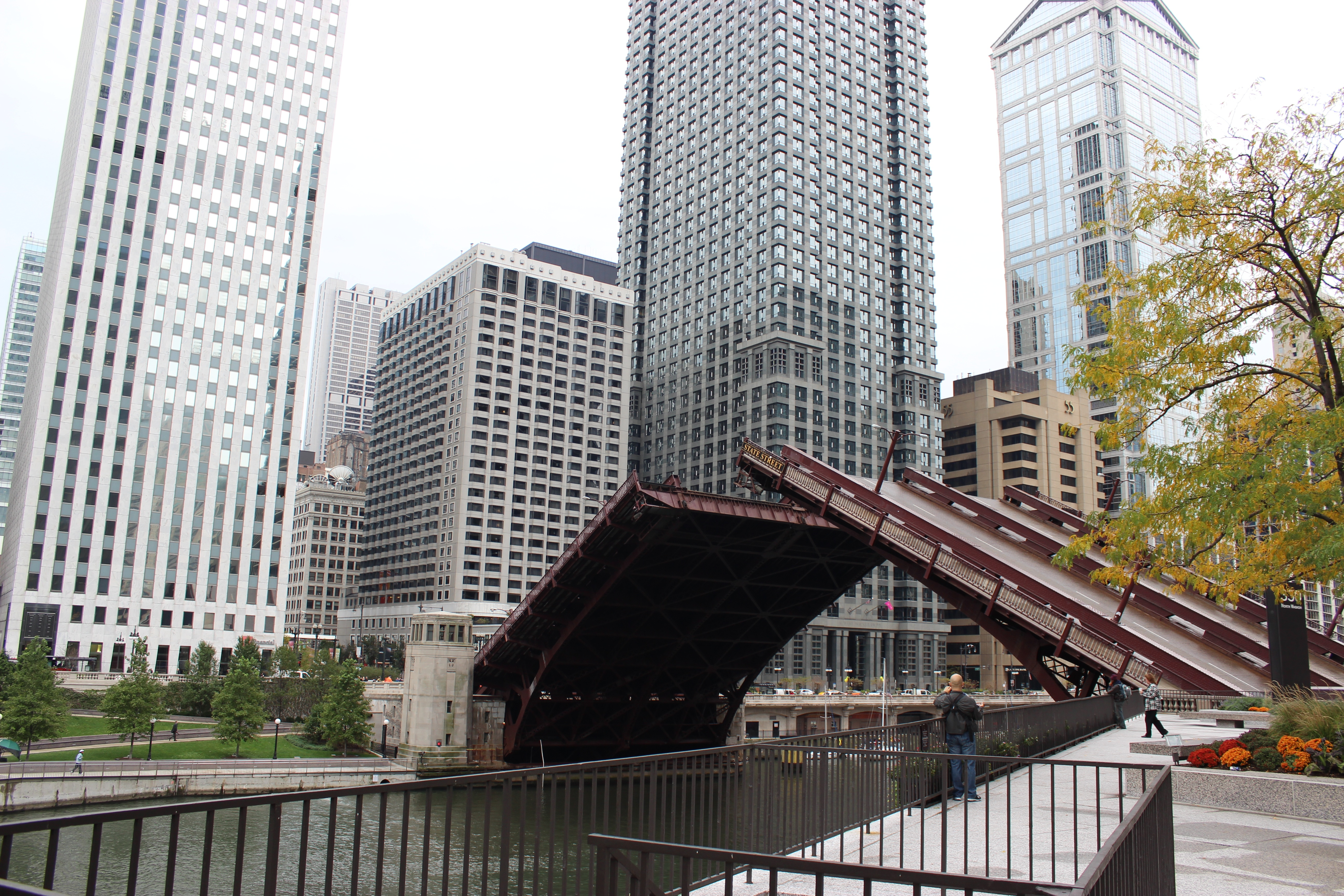
The current bridge with its bascule span open for river traffic

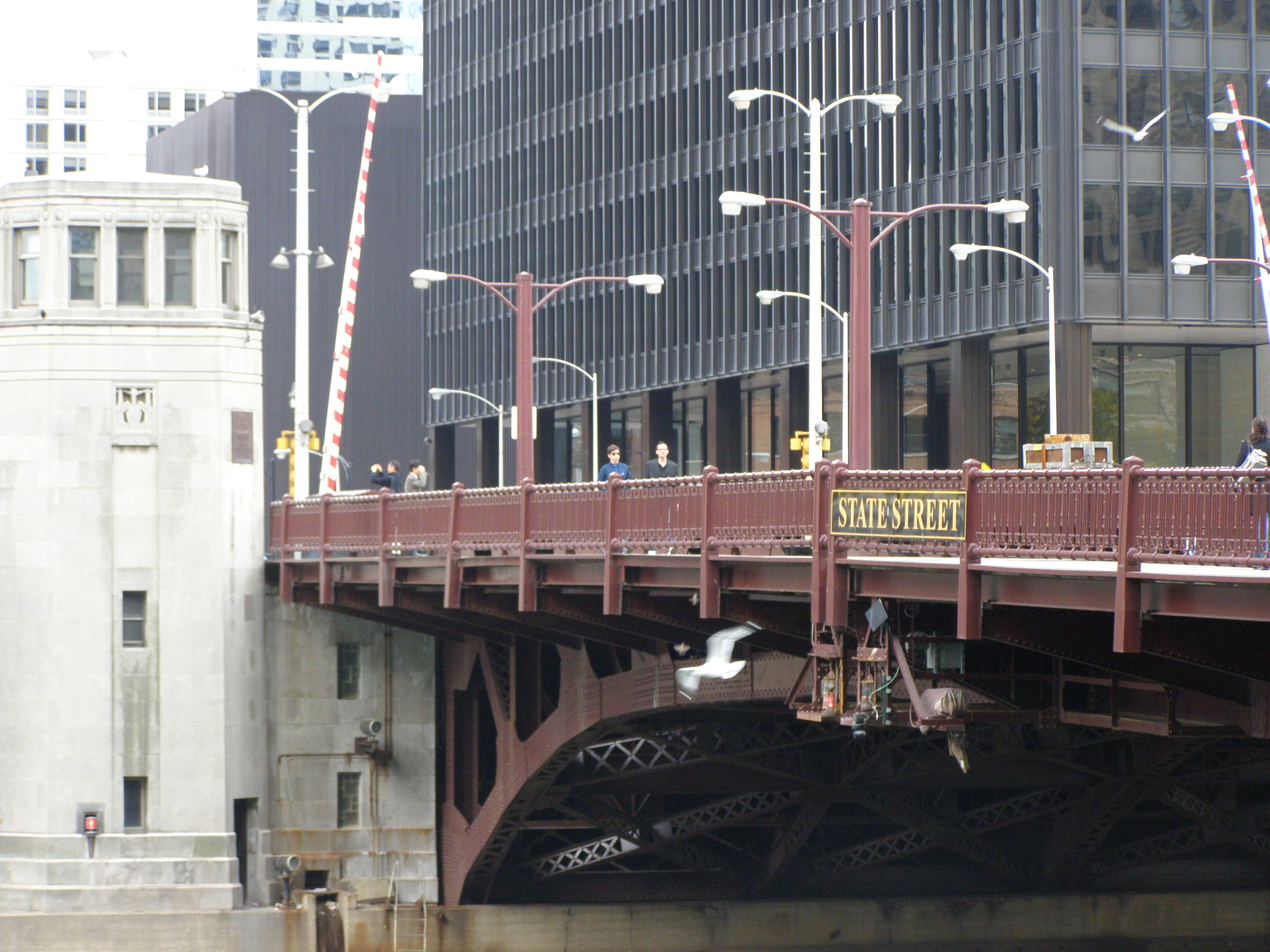
The bridge in 2008
