= Alice Birney =

American educator (1858-1907)

Alice McLellan Birney
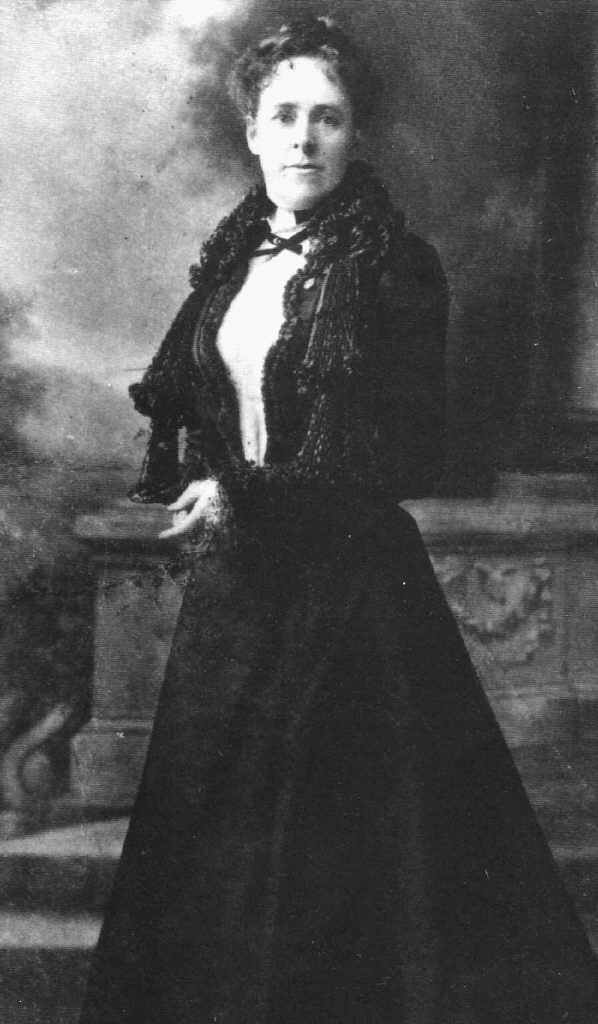
- Born: Alice Josephine McLellan; October 19, 1858; Marietta, Georgia, U.S.
- Died: December 20, 1907 (aged 49); Chevy Chase, Maryland, U.S.
- Resting place: Oak Hill Cemetery; Washington, D.C., U.S.
- Education: Mount Holyoke Seminary
- Occupation: Educator

Alice McLellan Birney (October 19, 1858 – December 20, 1907) was an American educator who co-founded the National Parent-Teacher Association in 1897.

== Early life and education ==
Alice Josephine McLellan was born in Marietta, Georgia, the daughter of Leander and Harriet Tatem McLellan. She finished high school at age 15. After briefly attending Mount Holyoke College, she worked as a schoolteacher, an advertiser, and a social worker.

== Career ==
She and Phoebe Hearst founded the National Congress of Mothers, later known as the Parent-Teacher Association, with the first meeting held in Washington, D. C. in 1897. Birney served as president for its first five years. Birney also wrote widely on the topic of child-rearing, including the 1905 book Childhood, a compilation of her articles written for The Delineator and other publications. Due to her declining health, Birney was replaced by Hannah Kent Schoff in 1902 as president of the National Congress of Mothers.

== Personal life and legacy ==
After her first husband, lawyer Alonzo J. White Jr., died in 1880, she married Theodore Weld Birney (a grandson of James G. Birney) in 1892. She had three daughters, Alonsita Eliza White (b. 1881), Catherine Weld Birney (b. 1893), and Lillian Harriet Birney (b. 1895). "Weld" is a reference to Theodore Dwight Weld. She was again widowed in 1897. Birney died of cancer at Chevy Chase, Maryland, in 1907, age 49; her remains were buried at Oak Hill Cemetery in Washington D.C.

Because of her efforts, a number of elementary and middle schools throughout the United States have been named in her honor, including Alice M. Birney Elementary School in Long Beach, California, Alice M. Birney Elementary School in Pico Rivera, California, Alice Birney Elementary in San Diego, California, Alice M. Birney Middle School (defunct) in Southfield, Michigan, Alice Birney Waldorf Elementary School, Sacramento, California, and Alice Birney Middle School (defunct) in North Charleston, South Carolina and Alice Birney Elementary in Fresno, California.
