= The Sporting News Pitcher of the Year Award =

Annual baseball award to recognize the best pitchers

Starting and Relief Pitchers of the Year awards
- Sport: Baseball
- League: Major League Baseball
- Awarded for: Most outstanding starting and relief pitcher in the American League and National League
- Country: United States, Canada
- Presented by: The Sporting News

History
- First award: 1944: Pitcher of the Year AL: Hal Newhouser NL: Bill Voiselle; 2013: Starting Pitcher of the Year / Relief Pitcher of the Year
- Most recent: NL: Paul Skenes (SP), Edwin Diaz (RP); AL: Tarik Skubal (SP), Aroldis Chapman (RP)

The Sporting News established the Pitcher of the Year Award in 1944 to recognize the most outstanding pitchers in Major League Baseball (MLB). It was given annually (except in 1946 and 1947) to one pitcher each in the American League and National League. In 2013, the Pitcher of the Year Award was split into the Starting Pitcher of the Year Award and Relief Pitcher of the Year Award, which are given annually to a starting pitcher and relief pitchers in each league, as judged by The Sporting News baseball experts.

== History ==
By the Second World War, The Sporting News, had been giving Player of the Year and Manager of the Year awards since 1936, and an annual Most Valuable Player Award since 1929. In 1944, The Sporting News inaugurated its Pitcher of the Year Award, which has been given each year since to the most outstanding pitcher in each league, with a brief hiatus from 1946 to 1947. Beginning in 2013, Sporting News issues two awards per league—one to the most outstanding starting pitcher, and one to the most outstanding reliever.

This award was established before there was a Cy Young Award, MLB's official honor for the best pitcher in each league. The Cy Young Award is voted by baseball writers from each city, and critics claim that the writers who follow a particular team or player throughout a season are naturally inclined to vote for him.

Three knuckleball pitchers have won the award: Joe Niekro, Wilbur Wood and R. A. Dickey.

=== Award firsts ===
Accomplishment	American League			National League			Ref.
Accomplishment	Player	Age	Year	Player	Age	Year	Ref.
First winner	Hal Newhouser ^{†}	23	1944	Bill Voiselle	25	1944	
First two-time winner	Hal Newhouser ^{†}	24	1945	Robin Roberts	29	1955	
First three-time winner	Bob Lemon ^{†}	34	1954	Warren Spahn ^{†}	37	1958	
First four-time winner	Roger Clemens	36	1998	Warren Spahn ^{†}	40	1961	
First five-time winner	Roger Clemens	39	2001				
First to win two consecutive	Hal Newhouser ^{†}	24	1945	Warren Spahn ^{†}	37	1958	
First to win three consecutive				Sandy Koufax ^{†}	29	1965	
First to win four consecutive				Sandy Koufax ^{†}	30	1966	
First to win in both leagues	Vida Blue	22	1971	Vida Blue	29	1978	
Youngest winner	Vida Blue	22	1971	Dwight Gooden	20	1985	

In 1946, Hal Newhouser (W-L: 26–9, ERA: 1.94, Ks: 275) could have narrowly won the award or tied with Bob Feller (W-L: 26–15, ERA: 2.18, Ks: 348) based upon his statistics. It would have been Newhouser's third consecutive win, a feat not yet accomplished by an American League pitcher; however, Sporting News did not issue the award in 1946 or 1947.

In 1981, Fernando Valenzuela won three The Sporting News awards: Pitcher of the Year, Rookie Pitcher of the Year, and Player of the Year.

== Winners ==
=== Key ===
*	Also named SN Player of the Year
**	Also named SN Rookie Pitcher of the year
^{†}	Member of the National Baseball Hall of Fame and Museum
^{§}	Major League Pitching Triple Crown – Led Majors in Wins, Strikeouts and ERA.
‡	Indicates player won the Warren Spahn Award that season.
	Player is active
Italics	Indicates player led the National or American League in Wins, Strikeouts, ERA or Saves.
Italics	Indicates player led the Major League in Wins, Strikeouts, ERA or Saves.

=== American League ===
Listed below in reverse chronological order are the American League pitchers chosen by Sporting News as recipients of the Pitcher of the Year Award.

==== American League starting pitchers ====
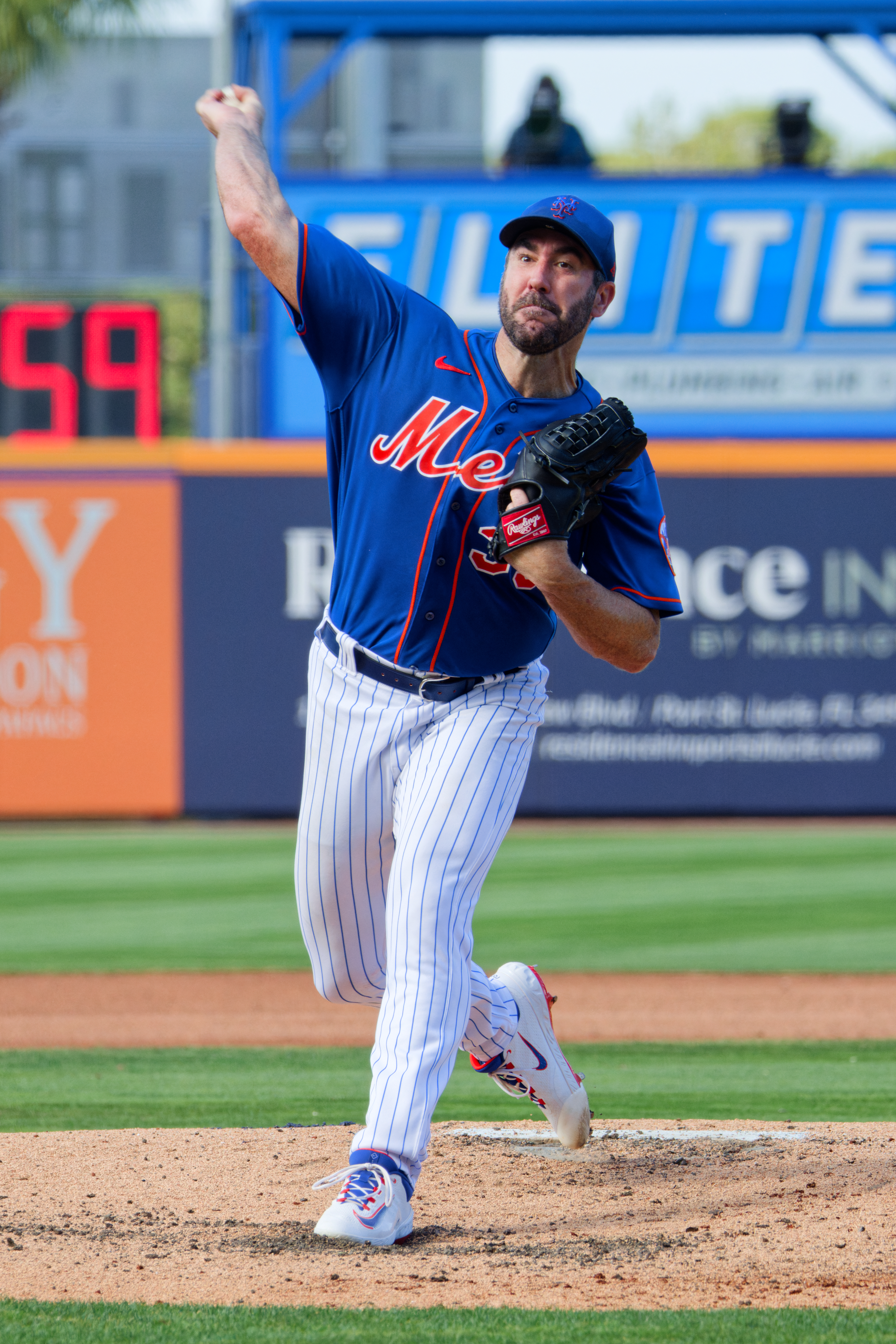
Three time winner Verlander.

Year	Pitcher	Team	Record	ERA	K	References
2025	Tarik Skubal (2)	Detroit Tigers	13–6	2.21	241	
2024	Tarik Skubal (1)	Detroit Tigers	18–4	2.39	228	
2023	Gerrit Cole (3)	New York Yankees	15–4	2.63	222	
2022	Justin Verlander (3)	Houston Astros	18-4	1.75	185	
2021	Gerrit Cole (2)	New York Yankees	16–8	3.23	243	
2020	Shane Bieber	Cleveland Indians	8–1	1.63	122	
2019	Gerrit Cole (1)	Houston Astros	20–5	2.50	326	
2018	Chris Sale (2)	Boston Red Sox	12–4	2.11	237	
2017	Chris Sale (1)	Boston Red Sox	17–8	2.90	308	
2016	Corey Kluber	Cleveland Indians	18–9	3.14	227	
2015	Dallas Keuchel ‡	Houston Astros	20–8	2.48	216	
2014	Félix Hernández (2)	Seattle Mariners	15–6	2.14	248	
2013	Max Scherzer (1)	Detroit Tigers	21–3	2.90	240	

==== American League relief pitchers ====
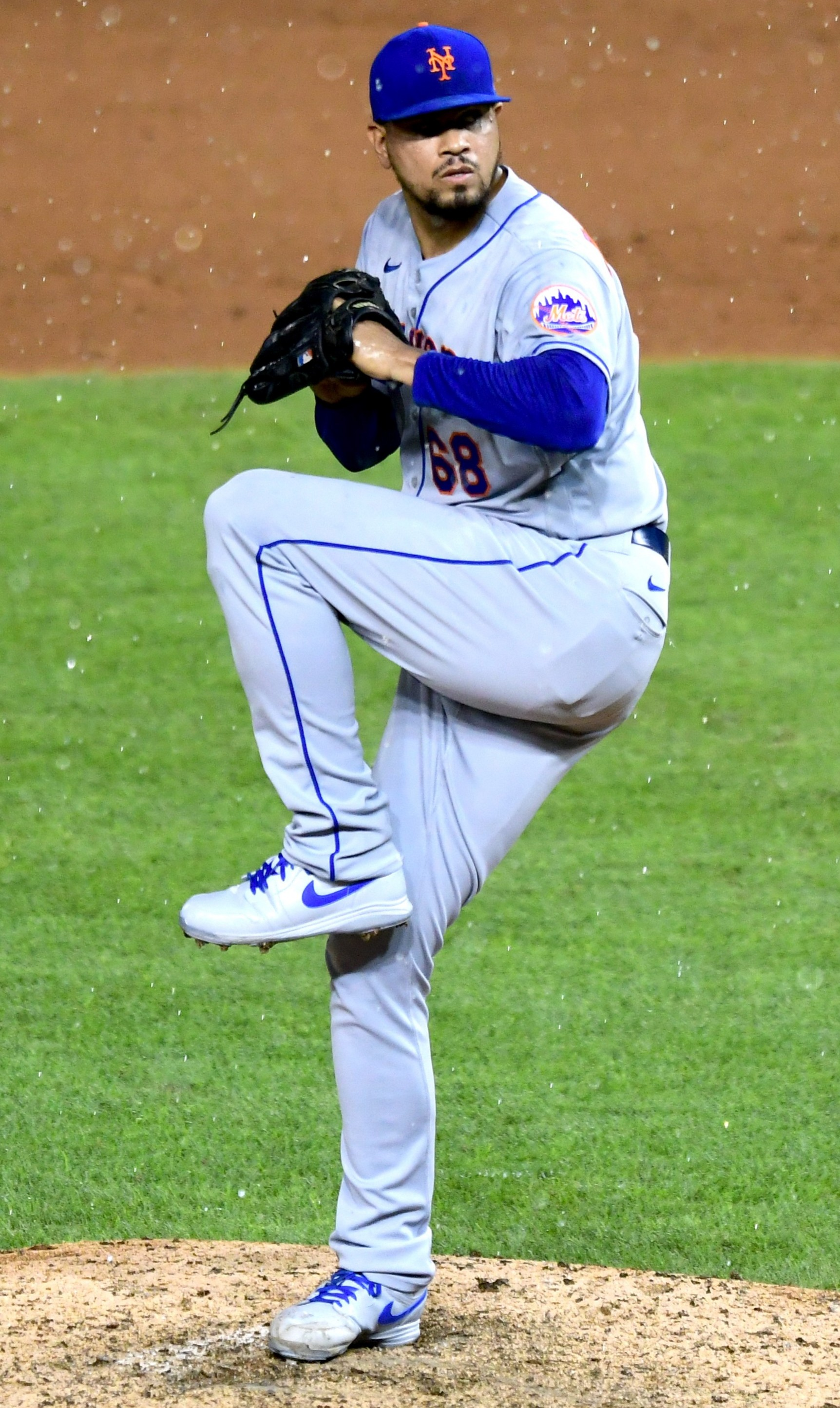
Two-time winner Betances.

Year	Pitchers	Team	Record	ERA	Saves	References
2025	Aroldis Chapman	Boston Red Sox	5–3	1,17	32	
2024	Emmanuel Clase	Cleveland Guardians	4–2	0.61	47	
2023	Félix Bautista	Baltimore Orioles	8–2	1.48	33	
2022	Emmanuel Clase	Cleveland Guardians	3–4	1.36	42	
2021	Liam Hendriks (3)	Chicago White Sox	8–1	2.54	38	
2020	Liam Hendriks (2)	Oakland Athletics	3–1	1.78	14	
2019	Liam Hendriks (1)	Oakland Athletics	4–4	1.80	25	
2018	Edwin Díaz (1)	Seattle Mariners	0–4	1.96	57	
2017	Craig Kimbrel (3)	Boston Red Sox	5–0	1.43	35	
2016	Zach Britton	Baltimore Orioles	2–1	0.54	47	
2015	Dellin Betances (2)	New York Yankees	6–4	1.50	9	
2014	Dellin Betances (1)	New York Yankees	5–0	1.40	1	
2013	Greg Holland	Kansas City Royals	2–1	1.21	47	

==== American League pitchers ====
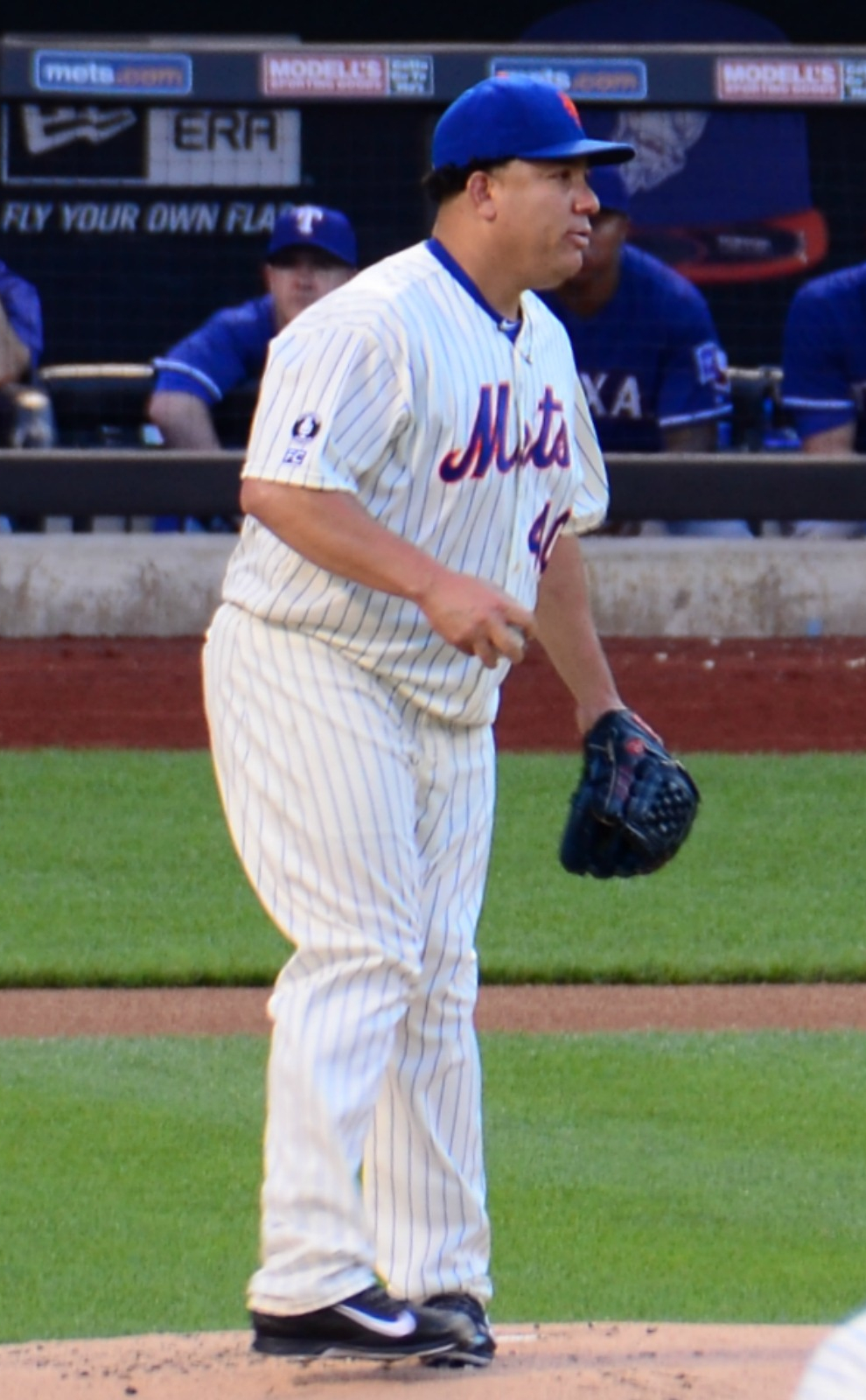
Bartolo Colón, 2005 winner, was the MLB leader in BB per 9 IP (1.11) in 2015, while pitching for the Mets.

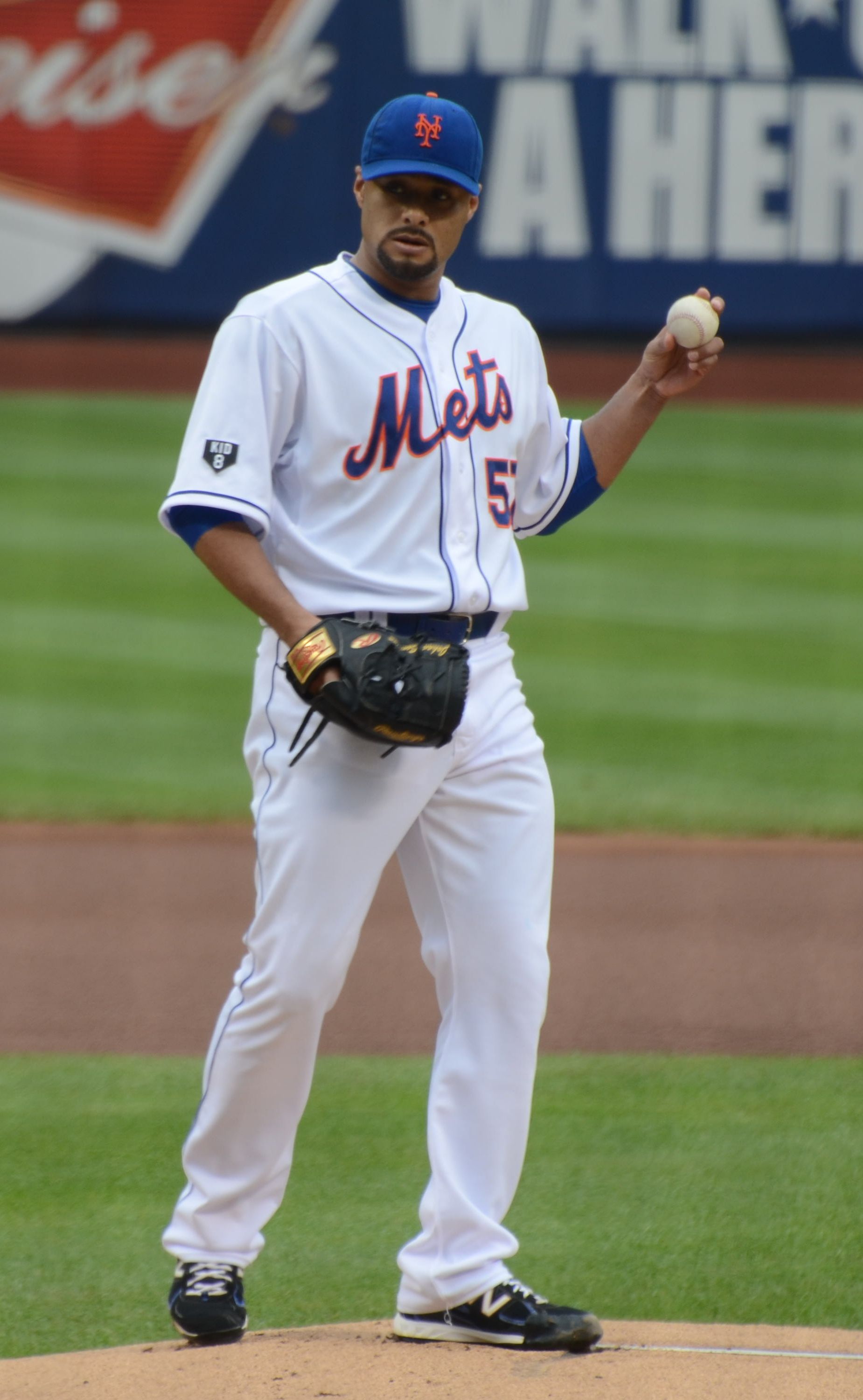
Johan Santana, two-time winner, was the MLB ERA champ in 2008, while pitching for the Mets.

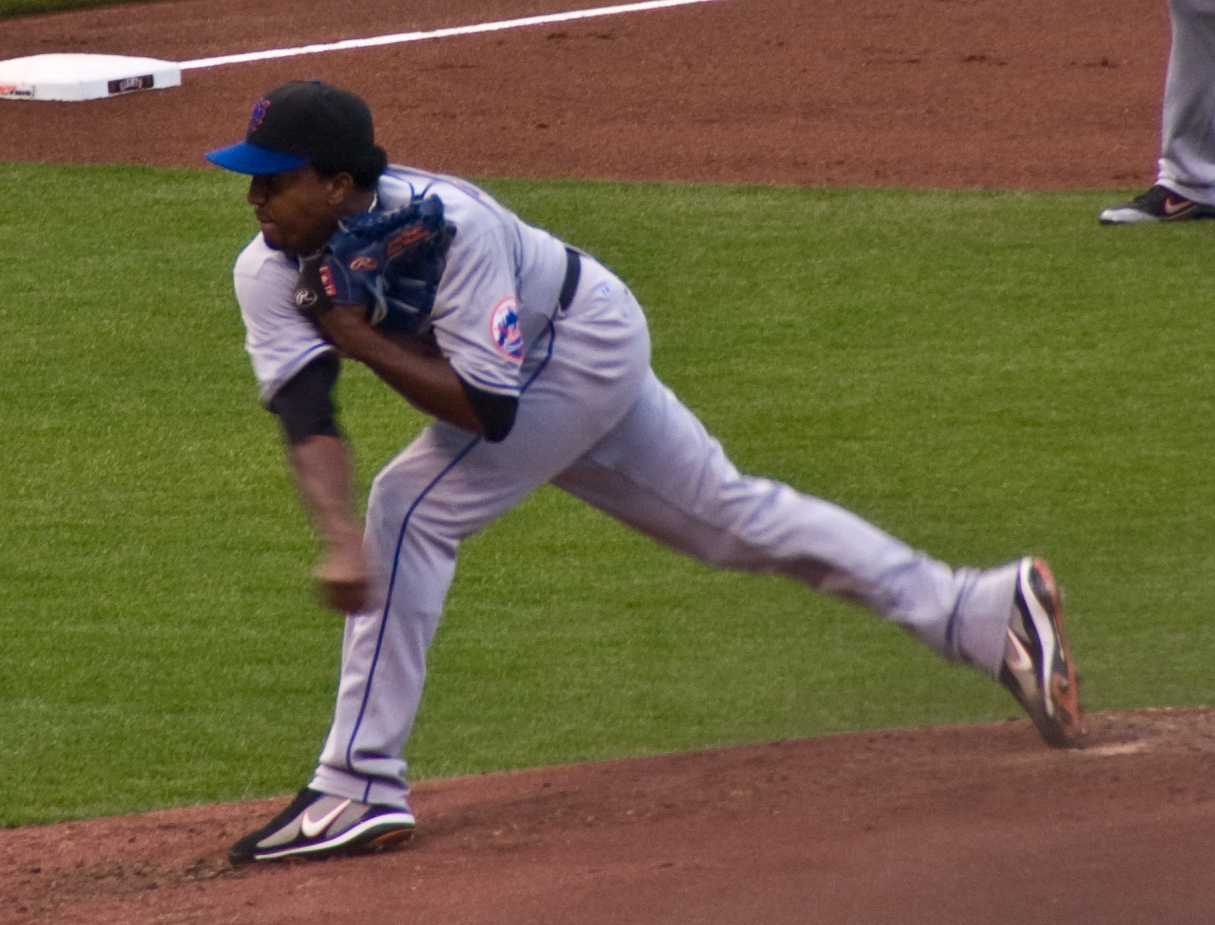
Hall of Famer Pedro Martínez, three-time winner, reached 3,000 strikeouts while pitching for the Mets.

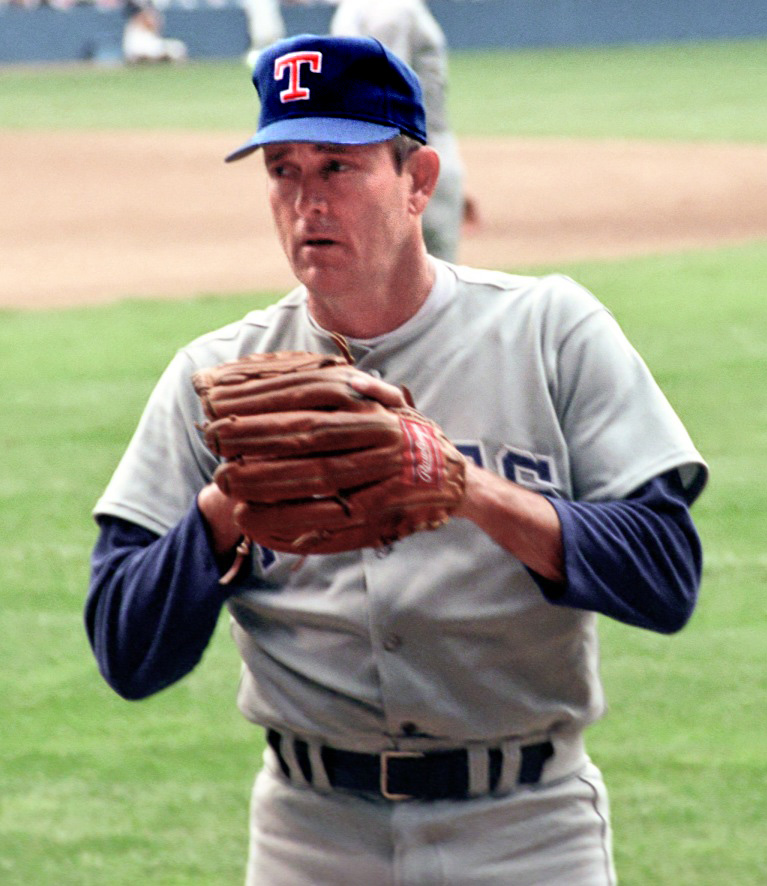
Hall of Famer Nolan Ryan, 1977 winner, won his only World Series pitching for the Mets.

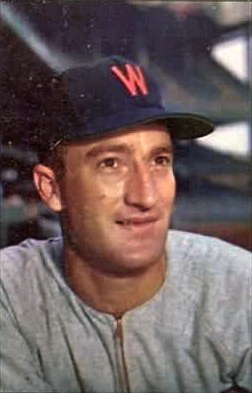
Bob Porterfield, 1953 winner.

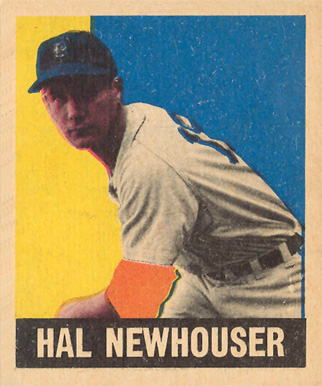
Hall of Famer Hal Newhouser, the first and youngest player to win 2 consecutive Pitcher of the Year Awards.

Year	Pitcher	Team	Record	ERA	K	References
2012	Justin Verlander (2)	Detroit Tigers	17–8	2.64	239	
2012	David Price	Tampa Bay Rays	20–5	2.56	205	
2011	Justin Verlander* (1)	Detroit Tigers	24–5	2.40	250	
2010	Félix Hernández (1)	Seattle Mariners	13–12	2.27	232	
2009	Zack Greinke (1)	Kansas City Royals	16–8	2.16	242	
2008	Cliff Lee	Cleveland Indians	22–3	2.54	170	
2007	CC Sabathia ^{†}	Cleveland Indians	19–7	3.21	209	
2006	Johan Santana ^{§}‡(2)	Minnesota Twins	19–6	2.77	245	
2005	Bartolo Colón	Los Angeles Angels of Anaheim	21–8	3.48	157	
2004	Johan Santana ‡(1)	Minnesota Twins	20–6	2.61	265	
2003	Roy Halladay ^{†} (1)	Toronto Blue Jays	22–7	3.25	204	
2002	Barry Zito	Oakland Athletics	23–5	2.75	182	
2001	Roger Clemens (5)	New York Yankees	20–3	3.51	213	
2000	Pedro Martínez ^{†} (3)	Boston Red Sox	18–6	1.74	284	
1999	Pedro Martínez ^{†} (2)	Boston Red Sox	23–4	2.07	313	
1998	Roger Clemens (4)	Toronto Blue Jays	20–6	2.65	271	
1997	Roger Clemens (3)	Toronto Blue Jays	21–7	2.05	292	
1996	Pat Hentgen	Toronto Blue Jays	20–10	3.22	177	
1995	Randy Johnson ^{†}	Seattle Mariners	18–2	2.48	294	
1994	Jimmy Key (2)	New York Yankees	17–4	2.48	177	
1993	Jack McDowell	Chicago White Sox	22–10	3.37	158	
1992	Dennis Eckersley ^{†}	Oakland Athletics	7–1	1.91	93	
1991	Roger Clemens (2)	Boston Red Sox	18–10	2.62	241	
1990	Bob Welch	Oakland Athletics	27–6	2.95	127	
1989	Bret Saberhagen (2)	Kansas City Royals	23–6	2.16	193	
1988	Frank Viola	Minnesota Twins	24–7	2.64	193	
1987	Jimmy Key (1)	Toronto Blue Jays	17–8	2.76	161	
1986	Roger Clemens* (1)	Boston Red Sox	24–4	2.48	238	
1985	Bret Saberhagen (1)	Kansas City Royals	20–6	2.87	143	
1984	Willie Hernández	Detroit Tigers	9–3	1.92	112	
1983	LaMarr Hoyt	Chicago White Sox	24–10	3.66	148	
1982	Dave Stieb	Toronto Blue Jays	17–14	3.25	138	
1981	Jack Morris ^{†}	Detroit Tigers	14–7	3.05	97	
1980	Steve Stone	Baltimore Orioles	25–7	3.23	149	
1979	Mike Flanagan	Baltimore Orioles	23–9	3.08	190	
1978	Ron Guidry*	New York Yankees	25–3	1.74	248	
1977	Nolan Ryan ^{†}	California Angels	19–16	2.77	341	
1976	Jim Palmer ^{†}(3)	Baltimore Orioles	22–13	2.51	159	
1975	Jim Palmer ^{†} (2)	Baltimore Orioles	23–11	2.09	193	
1974	Catfish Hunter ^{†}	Oakland Athletics	25–12	2.49	143	
1973	Jim Palmer ^{†}(1)	Baltimore Orioles	22–9	2.40	158	
1972	Wilbur Wood	Chicago White Sox	24–17	2.51	193	
1971	Vida Blue (1)	Oakland Athletics	24–8	1.82	301	
1970	Sam McDowell	Cleveland Indians	20–12	2.92	304	
1969	Denny McLain (2)	Detroit Tigers	24–9	2.80	181	
1968	Denny McLain* (1)	Detroit Tigers	31–6	1.96	280	
1967	Jim Lonborg	Boston Red Sox	22–9	3.16	246	
1966	Jim Kaat	Minnesota Twins	25–13	2.75	205	
1965	Mudcat Grant	Minnesota Twins	21–7	3.30	142	
1964	Dean Chance	Los Angeles Angels	20–9	1.65	207	
1963	Whitey Ford ^{†}(3)	New York Yankees	24–7	2.74	189	
1962	Dick Donovan	Cleveland Indians	20–10	3.59	94	
1961	Whitey Ford ^{†}(2)	New York Yankees	25–4	3.21	209	
1960	Chuck Estrada	Baltimore Orioles	18–11	3.58	144	
1959	Early Wynn* ^{†}	Chicago White Sox	22–10	3.17	179	
1958	Bob Turley*	New York Yankees	21–7	2.97	168	
1957	Billy Pierce (2)	Chicago White Sox	20–12	3.26	171	
1956	Billy Pierce (1)	Chicago White Sox	20–9	3.32	192	
1955	Whitey Ford ^{†}(1)	New York Yankees	18–7	2.63	137	
1954	Bob Lemon ^{†}(3)	Cleveland Indians	23–7	2.72	110	
1953	Bob Porterfield	Washington Senators	22–10	3.35	77	
1952	Bobby Shantz	Philadelphia Athletics	24–7	2.48	152	
1951	Bob Feller ^{†}	Cleveland Indians	22–8	3.50	111	
1950	Bob Lemon ^{†}(2)	Cleveland Indians	23–11	3.84	170	
1949	Ellis Kinder	Boston Red Sox	23–6	3.36	138	
1948	Bob Lemon ^{†}(1)	Cleveland Indians	20–14	2.82	147	
1945	Hal Newhouser* ^{†}^{§}(2)	Detroit Tigers	25–9	1.81	212	
1944	Hal Newhouser ^{†}(1)	Detroit Tigers	29–9	2.22	187	

=== National League ===
Listed below in reverse chronological order are the National League pitchers chosen by Sporting News as recipients of the Pitcher of the Year Award.

==== National League starting pitchers ====
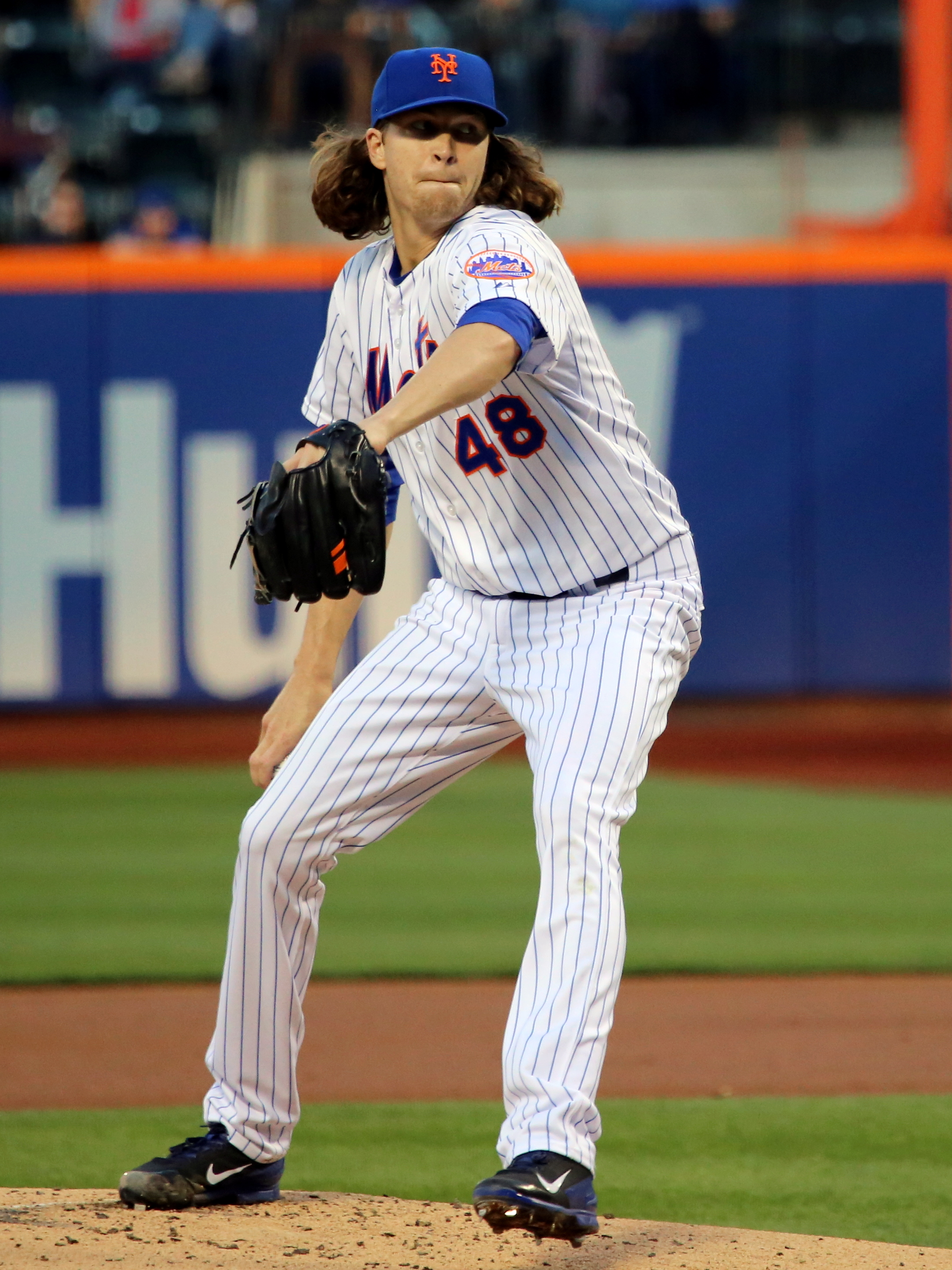
Three (3) time winner, Jacob deGrom, pitching with the Mets. Jacob led MLB with a 1.70 ERA in 2018

Year	Pitchers	Team	Record	ERA	K	References
2025	Paul Skenes	Pittsburgh Pirates	10–10	1.97	216	
2024	Chris Sale (3)	Atlanta Braves	18–3	2.38	225	
2023	Blake Snell ‡	San Diego Padres	14–9	2.25	234	
2022	Sandy Alcántara	Miami Marlins	14–9	2.28	207	
2021	Max Scherzer (4)	Washington Nationals/Los Angeles Dodgers	15–4	2.46	236	
2020	Jacob deGrom (3)	New York Mets	4–2	2.38	104	
2019	Jacob deGrom (2)	New York Mets	11–8	2.43	255	
2018	Jacob deGrom (1)	New York Mets	10–9	1.70	269	
2017	Max Scherzer (3)	Washington Nationals	16–6	2.51	268	
2016	Max Scherzer (2)	Washington Nationals	20–7	2.96	284	
2015	Zack Greinke (2)	Los Angeles Dodgers	19–3	1.66	200	
2014	Clayton Kershaw* ‡ (3)	Los Angeles Dodgers	21–3	1.77	239	
2013	Clayton Kershaw ‡ (2)	Los Angeles Dodgers	16–9	1.83	232	

==== National League relief pitchers ====
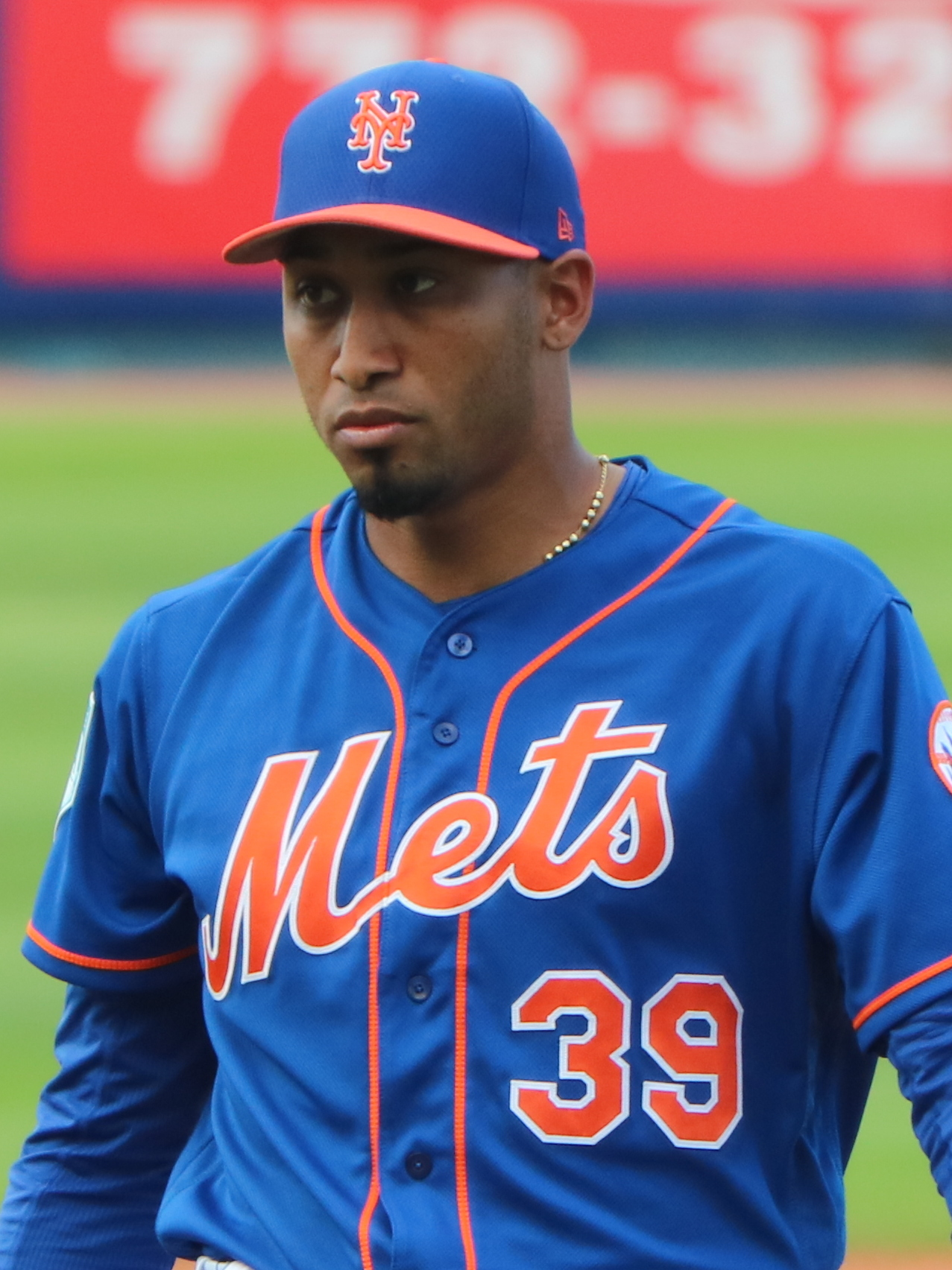
Edwin Diaz, Two (2) time winner, had a 1.31 ERA and averaged almost 2 strikeouts per inning in 2022.

Year	Pitchers	Team	Record	ERA	Saves	References
2025	Edwin Díaz (3)	New York Mets	6–3	1.63	28	
2024	Ryan Helsley	St. Louis Cardinals	7–4	2.04	49	
2024	Raisel Iglesias	Atlanta Braves	6–2	1.95	34	
2023	Devin Williams (2)	Milwaukee Brewers	8–3	1.56	36	
2022	Edwin Díaz (2)	New York Mets	3–1	1.31	32	
2021	Josh Hader (2)	Milwaukee Brewers	4–2	1.23	34	
2020	Devin Williams (1)	Milwaukee Brewers	4–1	0.33	0	
2019	Kirby Yates	San Diego Padres	0–5	1.19	41	
2018	Josh Hader (1)	Milwaukee Brewers	6–1	2.43	12	
2017	Kenley Jansen (2)	Los Angeles Dodgers	5–0	1.32	41	
2016	Kenley Jansen (1)	Los Angeles Dodgers	3–2	2.20	47	
2015	Mark Melancon	Pittsburgh Pirates	3–2	2.23	51	
2014	Craig Kimbrel (2)	Atlanta Braves	0–3	1.61	47	
2013	Craig Kimbrel (1)	Atlanta Braves	4–3	1.21	50	

==== National League pitchers ====
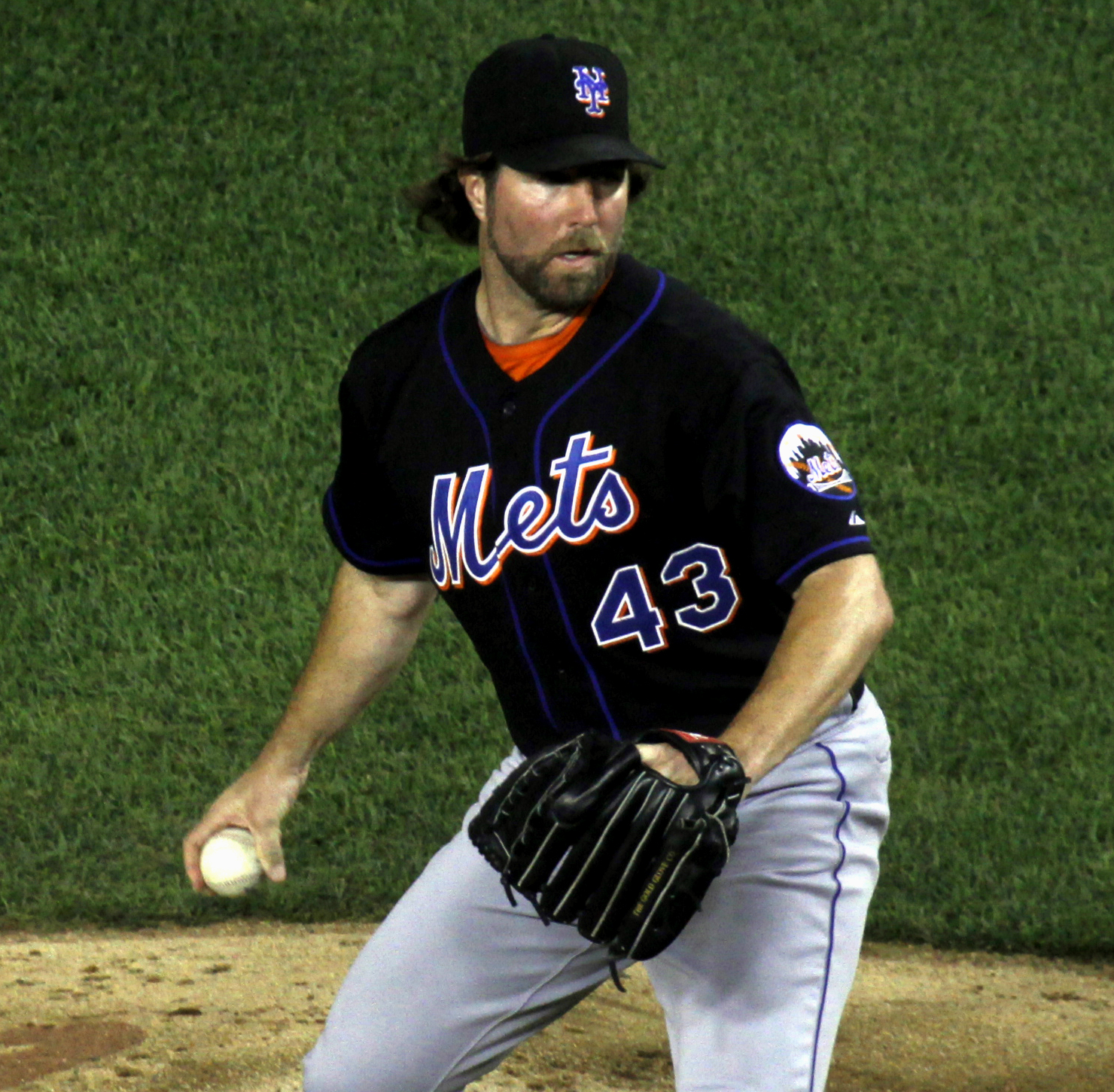
R. A. Dickey, 2012 NL winner and last knuckleballer to win award, pitching for the Mets.

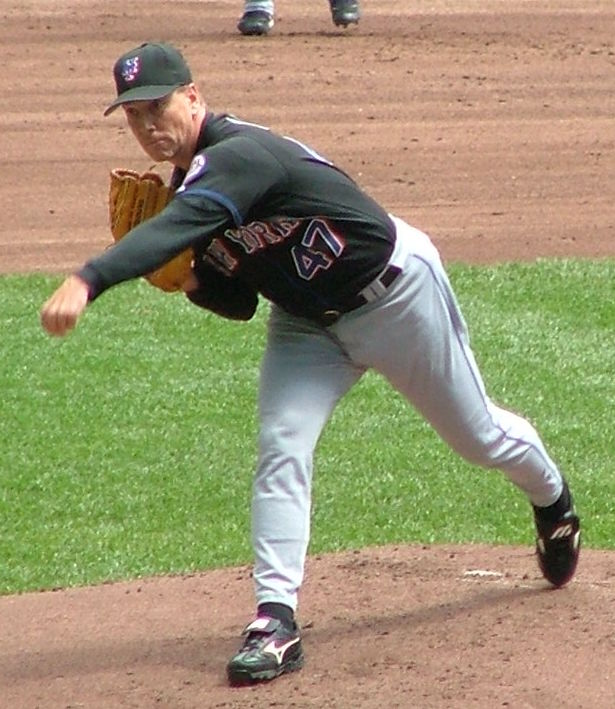
Hall of Famer Tom Glavine, two-time NL winner, won his 300th game while pitching for the Mets.

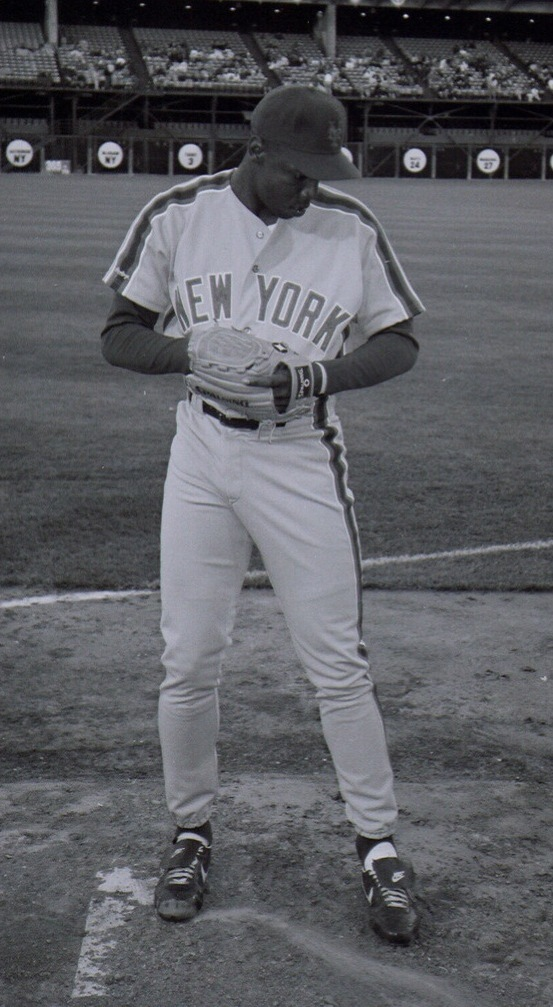
Dwight Gooden, 1985 NL winner and youngest player to win Pitcher of the Year Award, pitching for the Mets.

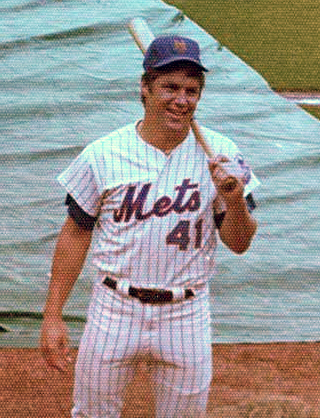
Hall of Famer Tom Seaver, two-time NL winner at Shea Stadium, 1974. Tom is one of two players to have 300 wins, 3,000Ks and a sub 3.00 career ERA.

Year	National League Pitchers	Team	Record	ERA	K	References
2012	R. A. Dickey	New York Mets	20–6	2.73	230	
2011	Clayton Kershaw ‡(1)	Los Angeles Dodgers	21–5	2.28	248	
2010	Roy Halladay ^{†} (2)	Philadelphia Phillies	21–10	2.44	219	
2009	Tim Lincecum (2)	San Francisco Giants	15–7	2.48	261	
2008	Tim Lincecum (1)	San Francisco Giants	18–5	2.62	265	
2007	Jake Peavy	San Diego Padres	19–6	2.54	240	
2006	Chris Carpenter (2)	St. Louis Cardinals	15–8	3.09	184	
2005	Chris Carpenter (1)	St. Louis Cardinals	21–5	2.83	213	
2004	Jason Schmidt	San Francisco Giants	18–7	3.49	206	
2003	Éric Gagné	Los Angeles Dodgers	2–3	1.20	137	
2002	Curt Schilling (2)	Arizona Diamondbacks	23–7	3.23	316	
2001	Curt Schilling (1)	Arizona Diamondbacks	22–6	2.98	293	
2000	Tom Glavine ^{†}(2)	Atlanta Braves	21–9	3.40	152	
1999	Mike Hampton	Houston Astros	22–4	2.90	177	
1998	Kevin Brown	San Diego Padres	18–7	2.38	257	
1997	Pedro Martínez ^{†} (1)	Montreal Expos	17–8	1.90	305	
1996	John Smoltz ^{†}	Atlanta Braves	24–8	2.94	276	
1995	Greg Maddux ^{†}(4)	Atlanta Braves	19–2	1.63	181	
1994	Greg Maddux ^{†}(3)	Atlanta Braves	16–6	1.56	156	
1993	Greg Maddux ^{†}(2)	Atlanta Braves	20–10	2.36	197	
1992	Greg Maddux ^{†}(1)	Chicago Cubs	20–11	2.18	199	
1991	Tom Glavine ^{†}(1)	Atlanta Braves	20–11	2.55	192	
1990	Doug Drabek	Pittsburgh Pirates	22–6	2.76	131	
1989	Mark Davis	San Diego Padres	4–3	1.85	92	
1988	Orel Hershiser*	Los Angeles Dodgers	23–8	2.26	213	
1987	Rick Sutcliffe (2)	Chicago Cubs	18–10	3.68	174	
1986	Mike Scott	Houston Astros	18–10	2.22	306	
1985	Dwight Gooden ^{§}	New York Mets	24–4	1.53	268	
1984	Rick Sutcliffe ^{a} (1)	Chicago Cubs	16–1	2.69	155	
1983	John Denny	Philadelphia Phillies	19–6	2.37	139	
1982	Steve Carlton ^{†}(4)	Philadelphia Phillies	23–11	3.10	286	
1981	Fernando Valenzuela* **	Los Angeles Dodgers	13–7	2.48	180	
1980	Steve Carlton ^{†}(3)	Philadelphia Phillies	24–9	2.34	286	
1979	Joe Niekro	Houston Astros	21–11	3.00	119	
1978	Vida Blue (2)	San Francisco Giants	18–10	2.79	171	
1977	Steve Carlton ^{†}(2)	Philadelphia Phillies	23–10	2.64	198	
1976	Randy Jones	San Diego Padres	22–14	2.74	93	
1975	Tom Seaver ^{†} (2)	New York Mets	22–9	2.38	243	
1974	Mike Marshall	Los Angeles Dodgers	15–12	2.42	143	
1973	Ron Bryant	San Francisco Giants	24–12	3.53	143	
1972	Steve Carlton ^{†}(1)	Philadelphia Phillies	27–10	1.97	310	
1971	Ferguson Jenkins ^{†}	Chicago Cubs	24–13	2.77	263	
1970	Bob Gibson ^{†}(2)	St. Louis Cardinals	23–7	3.12	274	
1969	Tom Seaver ^{†}(1)	New York Mets	25–7	2.21	208	
1968	Bob Gibson ^{†}(1)	St. Louis Cardinals	22–9	1.12	268	
1967	Mike McCormick	San Francisco Giants	22–10	2.85	150	
1966	Sandy Koufax ^{†}^{§}(4)	Los Angeles Dodgers	27–9	1.73	317	
1965	Sandy Koufax* ^{†}^{§} (3)	Los Angeles Dodgers	26–8	2.04	382	
1964	Sandy Koufax ^{†}(2)	Los Angeles Dodgers	19–5	1.74	223	
1963	Sandy Koufax* ^{†}^{§}(1)	Los Angeles Dodgers	25–5	1.88	306	
1962	Don Drysdale* ^{†}	Los Angeles Dodgers	25–9	2.83	232	
1961	Warren Spahn ^{†}(4)	Milwaukee Braves	21–13	3.02	115	
1960	Vern Law	Pittsburgh Pirates	20–9	3.08	120	
1959	Sam Jones	San Francisco Giants	21–15	2.83	209	
1958	Warren Spahn ^{†}(3)	Milwaukee Braves	22–11	3.07	150	
1957	Warren Spahn ^{†}(2)	Milwaukee Braves	21–11	2.69	111	
1956	Don Newcombe	Brooklyn Dodgers	27–7	3.06	139	
1955	Robin Roberts ^{†}(2)	Philadelphia Phillies	23–14	3.28	160	
1954	Johnny Antonelli	New York Giants	21–7	2.30	152	
1953	Warren Spahn ^{†}(1)	Milwaukee Braves	23–7	2.10	148	
1952	Robin Roberts* ^{†}(1)	Philadelphia Phillies	28–7	2.59	148	
1951	Preacher Roe	Brooklyn Dodgers	22–3	2.93	146	
1950	Jim Konstanty	Philadelphia Phillies	16–7	2.66	56	
1949	Howie Pollet	St. Louis Cardinals	20–9	2.77	108	
1948	Johnny Sain	Boston Braves	24–15	2.60	137	
1945	Hank Borowy	Chicago Cubs	11–2	2.12	47	
1944	Bill Voiselle	New York Giants	21–16	3.02	161	

== Players ==
=== Multiple wins ===
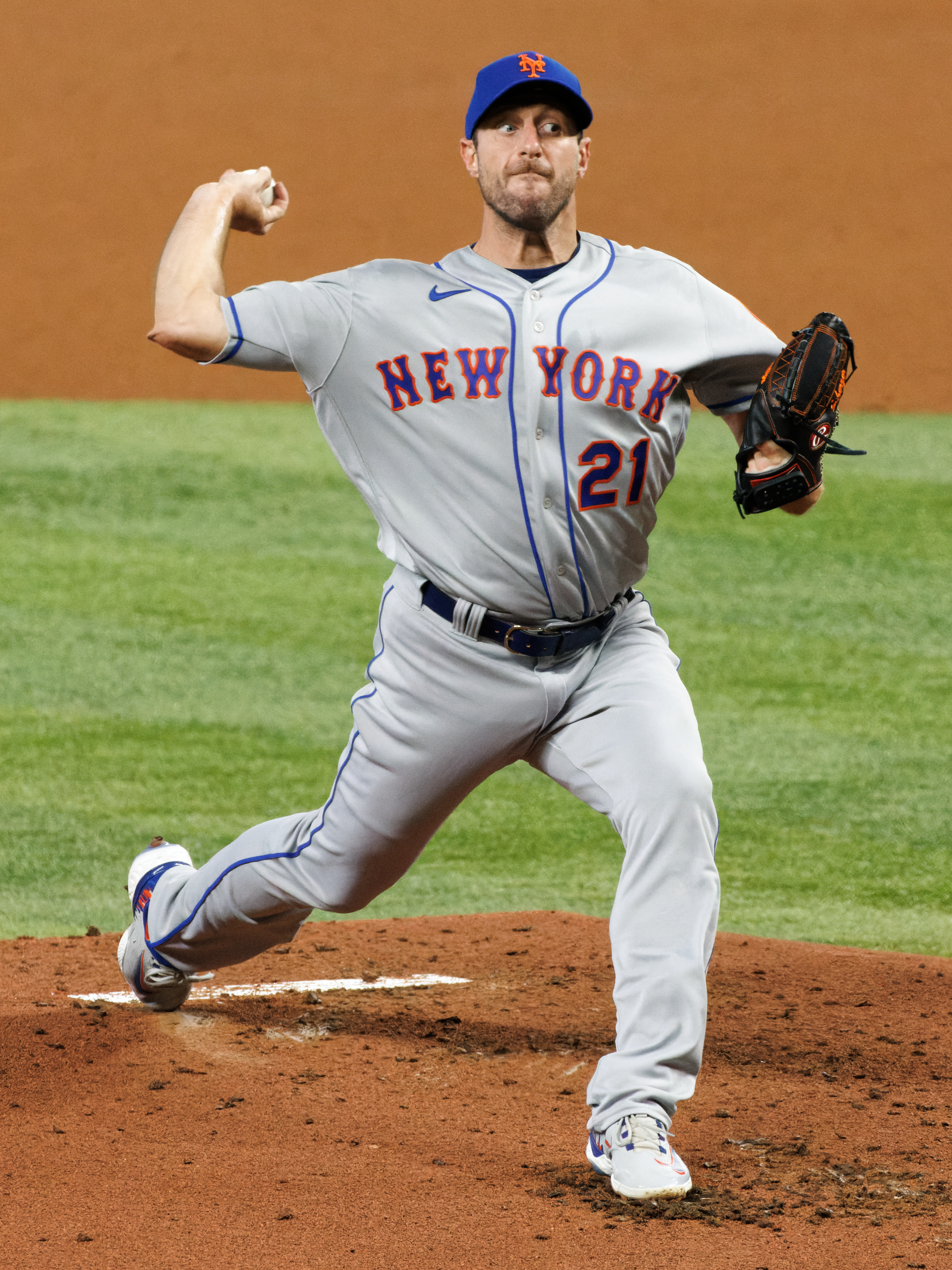
Four (4) time winner Max Scherzer with the Mets in 2023. Scherzer led MLB with a 0.864 WHIP in 2021

Several players have won the Pitcher of the Year Award more than once:

- Bob Lemon was the first player to win the award 3 times.
- Warren Spahn was the first to win the award 4 times and won his last award at the age of 40.
- Roger Clemens was the first to win the award 5 times.
- Sandy Koufax (1963–1966) and Greg Maddux (1992–1995) won the award 4 consecutive years.
- Pedro Martínez, Roy Halladay, Vida Blue, Zack Greinke, and Edwin Díaz won the award in the National League and American League.
- Max Scherzer won the award 4 times, once in AL and three times in NL.

Rank	Pitcher	# of Awards	Years
1	Roger Clemens	5	1986, 1991, 1997, 1998, 2001
2	Steve Carlton ^{†}	4	1972, 1977, 1980, 1982
2	Sandy Koufax ^{†}	4	1963, 1964, 1965, 1966
2	Greg Maddux ^{†}	4	1993, 1994, 1995, 1996
2	Warren Spahn ^{†}	4	1953, 1957, 1958, 1961
2	Max Scherzer	4	2013, 2016, 2017, 2021
7	Whitey Ford ^{†}	3	1955, 1961, 1963
7	Bob Lemon ^{†}	3	1948, 1950, 1954
7	Pedro Martínez ^{†}	3	1997, 1999, 2000
7	Jim Palmer ^{†}	3	1973, 1975, 1976
7	Gerrit Cole	3	2019, 2021, 2023
7	Jacob deGrom	3	2018, 2019, 2020
7	Edwin Díaz	3	2019, 2022, 2025
7	Liam Hendriks	3	2019, 2020, 2021
7	Clayton Kershaw	3	2011, 2013, 2014
7	Craig Kimbrel	3	2013, 2014, 2017
7	Chris Sale	3	2017, 2018, 2024
7	Justin Verlander	3	2011, 2012, 2022
19	Bob Gibson ^{†}	2	1968, 1970
19	Tom Glavine ^{†}	2	1991, 2000
19	Roy Halladay ^{†}	2	2003, 2010
19	Hal Newhouser ^{†}	2	1944, 1945
19	Robin Roberts ^{†}	2	1952, 1953
19	Tom Seaver ^{†}	2	1969, 1975
19	Vida Blue	2	1971, 1978
19	Chris Carpenter	2	2005, 2006
19	Zack Greinke	2	2009, 2015
19	Jimmy Key	2	1987, 1994
19	Denny McLain	2	1968, 1969
19	Billy Pierce	2	1956, 1957
19	Bret Saberhagen	2	1985, 1989
19	Johan Santana	2	2004, 2006
19	Curt Schilling	2	2001, 2002
19	Rick Sutcliffe	2	1984, 1987
19	Tim Lincecum	2	2008, 2009
19	Dellin Betances	2	2014, 2015
19	Josh Hader	2	2018, 2021
19	Félix Hernández	2	2010, 2014
19	Kenley Jansen	2	2016, 2017
19	Tarik Skubal	2	2024, 2025
19	Devin Williams	2	2019, 2023

=== MLB Triple Crown ===
Hall of Famer Sandy Koufax, 4-time consecutive NL winner (1963-1966), only pitcher to have won three Major League pitching Triple Crowns (1963, 1965–1966)

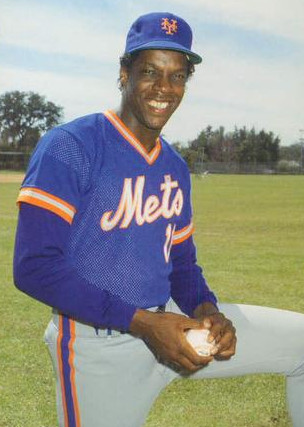
Dwight Gooden 1985 Major League Triple Crown winner with an era of 1.53. Last triple crown winner to have a lower era was Walter Johnson in 1918.

Only five Pitcher of the Year Award winners have led the major leagues in wins, ERA and strikeouts which is commonly called the Pitching Triple Crown. Below is a complete list including individuals before the award was created.

- Sandy Koufax is the only player to achieve it more than once. Koufax achieved it three times in a four-year period.
- Hal Newhouser, age 24 and Dwight Gooden, age 20 were the youngest individuals.
- Shane Bieber, age 26 was the last player to achieve this feat.
- Johan Santana, age 27, is the fifth individual.
- Walter Johnson and Lefty Grove achieved it twice before the award began.

Year	Player	Team	League	ERA	W	K	Rating	Ref(s)
1913	Walter Johnson^{†}(1)	Washington Senators	AL	1.14*	36*	243*	12.71	
1915	Grover Cleveland Alexander^{†}	Philadelphia Phillies	NL	1.22*	31*	241*	12.62	
1918	Walter Johnson^{†} (2)	Washington Senators	AL	1.27*	23*	162*	10.00	
1924	Dazzy Vance^{†}	Brooklyn Robins	NL	2.16*	28*	262*	9.80	
1930	Lefty Grove^{†} (1)	Philadelphia Athletics	AL	2.54*	28*	209*	8.47	
1931	Lefty Grove^{†} (2)	Philadelphia Athletics	AL	2.06*	31*	175*	9.09	
1945	Hal Newhouser^{†}	Detroit Tigers	AL	1.81*	25*	212*	9.62	
1963	Sandy Koufax^{†} (1)	Los Angeles Dodgers	NL	1.88*	25*	306*	10.41	
1965	Sandy Koufax^{†} (2)	Los Angeles Dodgers	NL	2.04*	26*	382*	11.39	
1966	Sandy Koufax^{†} (3)	Los Angeles Dodgers	NL	1.73*	27*	317*	11.15	
1985	Dwight Gooden	New York Mets	NL	1.53*	24*	268*	9.88	
2006	Johan Santana	Minnesota Twins	AL	2.77*	19*	245*	6.96	
2020	Shane Bieber	Cleveland Indians	AL	1.63*	8*	122*	3.32	

=== MLB Hall of Fame predictor ===
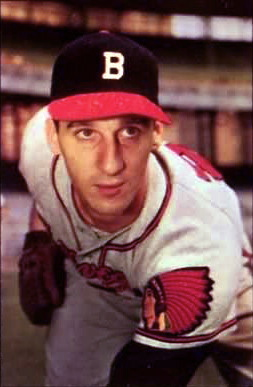
Hall of Famer Warren Spahn, 4-time NL winner, holds the major league record for wins (363) by a left-handed pitcher

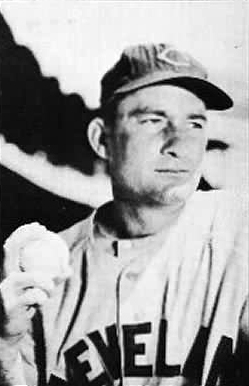
Hall of Famer Bob Lemon, three-time AL winner

Winning three or more Pitcher or Starting Pitcher of the Year Awards has been seen as a strong indicator of future admission to the Major League Baseball Hall of Fame (as active players are not eligible for the Hall of Fame). All of the eligible pitchers with three or more awards have been elected to the Hall of Fame, with one exception: Roger Clemens has the most (five) Pitcher of the Year Awards, is in the top ten for all-time wins and strikeouts, and is considered to be one of the best pitchers of all time. Clemens' alleged use of performance-enhancing drugs is the major stumbling block to be elected to the Hall of Fame.

Starting pitchers that have won three or more Pitcher of the Year Awards and the year they were inducted into Major League Baseball Hall of Fame. Active player statistics are through the 2026 season.

Pitcher	# of Awards	Years	HOF Year	Wins	ERA	Ks	References
Steve Carlton ^{†}	4	1972, 1977, 1980, 1982	1994	329	3.22	4,136	
Sandy Koufax ^{†}	4	1963, 1964, 1965, 1966	1972	165	2.76	2,396	
Greg Maddux ^{†}	4	1993, 1994, 1995, 1996	2014	355	3.16	3,371	
Warren Spahn ^{†}	4	1953, 1957, 1958, 1961	1973	363	3.09	2,583	
Max Scherzer	4	2013, 2016, 2017, 2021	Active-Not Eligible	225	3.29	3,557	
Whitey Ford ^{†}	3	1955, 1961, 1963	1974	236	2.75	1,956	
Bob Lemon ^{†}	3	1948, 1950, 1954	1976	207	3.23	1,277	
Pedro Martínez ^{†}	3	1997, 1999, 2000	2015	219	2.93	3,154	
Jim Palmer ^{†}	3	1973, 1975, 1976	1990	268	2.86	2,212	
Gerrit Cole	3	2019, 2021, 2023	Active-Not Eligible	163	3.20	2,382	
Jacob deGrom	3	2018, 2019, 2020	Active-Not Eligible	107	2.73	2,052	
Chris Sale	3	2017, 2018, 2024	Active-Not Eligible	159	2.95	2,779	
Clayton Kershaw	3	2011, 2013, 2014	Active-Not Eligible	223	2.53	3,052	
Justin Verlander	3	2011, 2012, 2022	Not Eligible	266	3.33	3,560	
Roger Clemens	5	1986, 1991, 1997, 1998, 2001	–	354	3.12	4,672	

=== MLB Hall of Famers ===
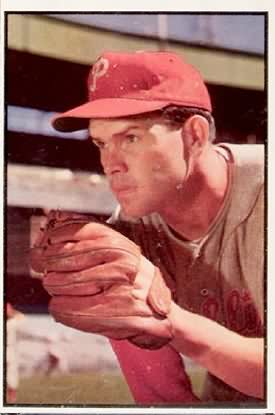
Hall of Famer Robin Roberts won the award in 1952 and 1953.

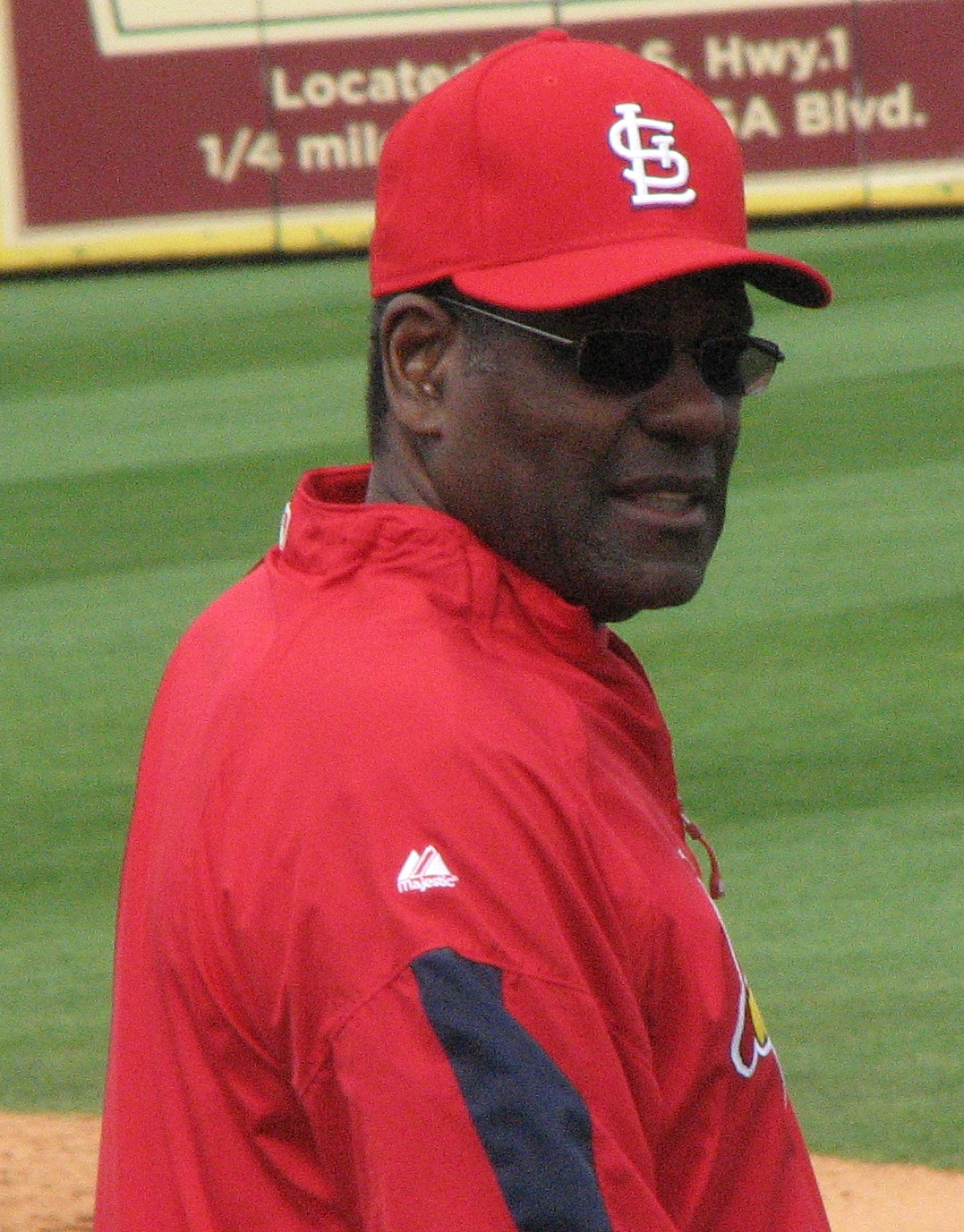
Hall of Famer Bob Gibson won the award in 1968 and 1970.

MLB Hall of Famers that won the SN Pitchers of the Year award.

Pitcher	# of Awards	Years	References
Steve Carlton ^{†}	4	1972, 1977, 1980, 1982	
Sandy Koufax ^{†}	4	1963, 1964, 1965, 1966	
Greg Maddux ^{†}	4	1993, 1994, 1995, 1996	
Warren Spahn ^{†}	4	1953, 1957, 1958, 1961	
Whitey Ford ^{†}	3	1955, 1961, 1963	
Bob Lemon ^{†}	3	1948, 1950, 1954	
Pedro Martínez ^{†}	3	1997, 1999, 2000	
Jim Palmer ^{†}	3	1973, 1975, 1976	
Bob Gibson ^{†}	2	1968, 1970	
Tom Glavine ^{†}	2	1991, 2000	
Roy Halladay ^{†}	2	2003, 2010	
Hal Newhouser ^{†}	2	1944, 1945	
Robin Roberts ^{†}	2	1952, 1953	
Tom Seaver ^{†}	2	1969, 1975	
Don Drysdale ^{†}	1	1992	
Dennis Eckersley ^{†}	1	1962	
Bob Feller ^{†}	1	1951	
Catfish Hunter ^{†}	1	1974	
Ferguson Jenkins ^{†}	1	1971	
Randy Johnson ^{†}	1	1995	
Jack Morris ^{†}	1	1981	
Nolan Ryan ^{†}	1	1977	
CC Sabathia ^{†}	1	2007	
John Smoltz ^{†}	1	1996	
Early Wynn ^{†}	1	1959	

=== 300 and 3,000 club members ===
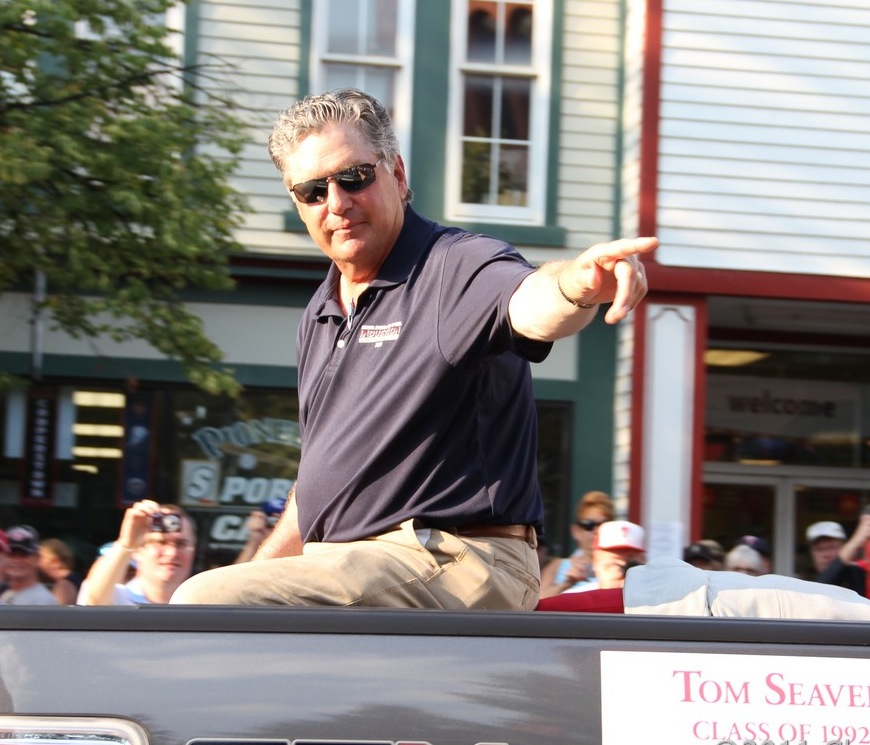
Tom Seaver at his 2011 Hall of Fame induction parade. Tom is one of two players to have 300 wins, 3,000Ks and a career ERA below 3.00.

Ten pitchers have recorded 300 wins and 3,000 strikeouts. A list of these elite pitchers with the years they won the Pitcher of the Year Award is below. Only two pitchers, Walter Johnson and Tom Seaver, have a career ERA below 3.00. Four pitchers have more than 4,000 career strikeouts. Walter Johnson is the best in wins, complete games, shutouts, ERA and WHIP. Nolan Ryan has the most strikeouts.

Pitcher	SN Pitcher of the Years	Wins	ERA	Ks	WHIP	CG	SHO	War for Pitchers	War per Year	Career Rating	Rating per Year	T	Ref(s)
Steve Carlton ^{†}	1972, 1977, 1980, 1982	329	3.22	4,136	1.247	254	55	84.13	3.501	120.70	5.029	L	
Roger Clemens	1986, 1991, 1997, 1998, 2001	354	3.12	4,672	1.173	100	38	138.7	5.78	128.34	5.35	R	
Randy Johnson ^{†}	1995	303	3.29	4,875	1.171	100	37	103.53	4.71	114.41	5.20	L	
Walter Johnson ^{†}	-	417	2.17	3,508	1.061	531	110	152.36	7.26	160.48	7.64	R	
Greg Maddux ^{†}	1993, 1994, 1995, 1996	355	3.16	3,371	1.143	109	35	104.78	4.56	115.29	5.01	R	
Phil Niekro ^{†}	-	318	3.35	3,342	1.268	245	45	96.97	4.04	109.81	4.58	R	
Gaylord Perry ^{†}	-	314	3.11	3,534	1.181	303	53	93.03	4.29	117.30	5.33	R	
Nolan Ryan ^{†}	1977	324	3.19	5,714	1.247	222	61	83.6	3.10	138.29	5.12	R	
Tom Seaver ^{†}	1969, 1975	311	2.86	3,640	1.121	231	61	106.07	5.31	118.68	5.93	R	
Don Sutton ^{†}	-	324	3.26	3,574	1.142	178	58	68.28	2.97	114.10	4.96	R	

=== Battle of Pitchers of the Year ===
It is a rare occurrence when reigning Pitcher of the Year winners face off against each other.

- A pitching duel occurred on August 28, 1989, when Frank Viola (WP: 10–15, 9IP, 5K, 3H, 0BB, 0R) of New York Mets pitched a complete-game shutout defeating Orel Hershiser (LP:14-10, 8IP, 4K, 8H, 1BB, 1ER) of the Dodgers 1–0.
- On May 9, 2013, Toronto's R. A. Dickey (6IP, 5K, 5H, 5BB, 2ER) pitched against David Price (8IP, 8K, 7H, 1BB, 2ER) of the Tampa Bay Rays. The Rays won in 10 innings, 5–4, and neither starting pitcher got a decision.
- Arizona's Zach Greinke (WP:7-3, 11K, 7IP, 4H, 0BB, 0R) bested (3–0) Houston's Dallas Keuchel (LP:3-7, 6IP, 6K, 6H, 1BB, 3 ER) on June 2, 2016.

=== The lost years ===
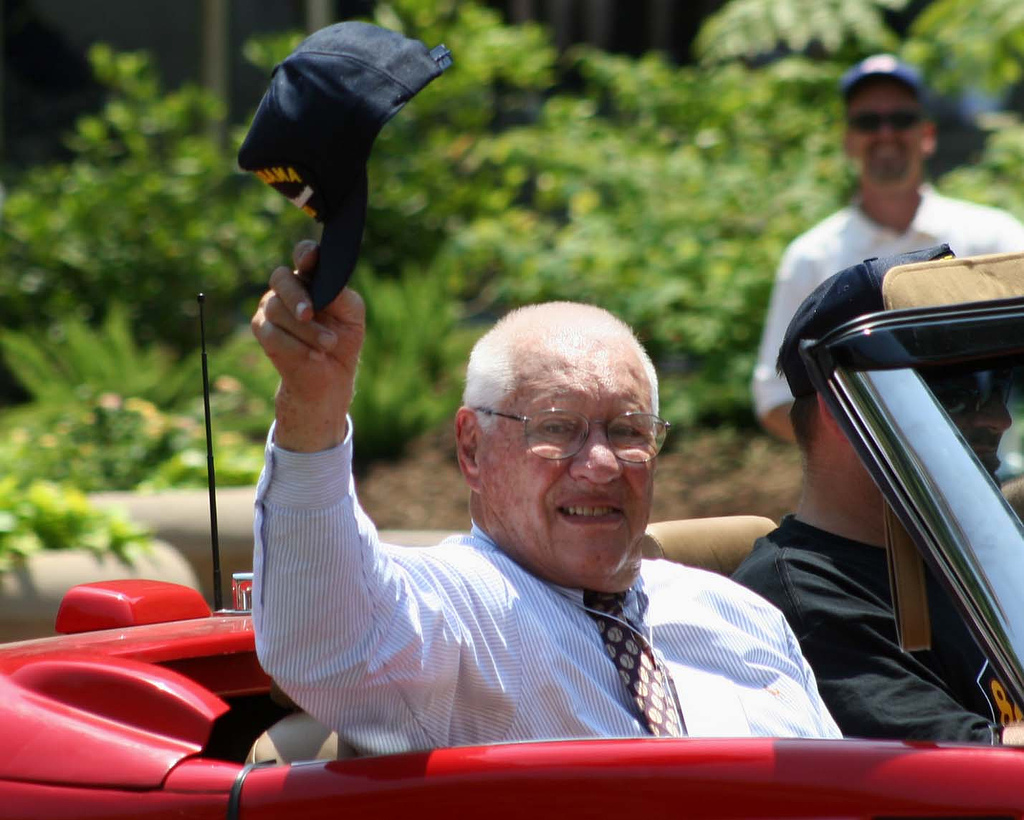
Hall of Famer "Bullet Bob" Feller, 1951 winner, could have won in 1946 and 1947.

The award was suspended for 1946–1947. A list of the lost year's top two pitchers in each league based on a pitcher rating composed of wins, ERA and strikeouts is below. A pitcher rating of 6.0 is considered very good. A rating of 9.00 (1.5*6) is rare. Bob Feller and Hal Newhouser in 1946 AL had a rating above 9.

Year	League	Pitcher	Team	Record	ERA	K	WHIP	Rating	Ref(s)
1947	AL	Bob Feller ^{†}	Cleveland Indians	20–11	2.68	196	1.194	7.43	
1947	AL	Phil Marchildon	Philadelphia Athletics	19–9	3.22	128	1.334	5.65	
1946	AL	Bob Feller ^{†}	Cleveland Indians	26–15	2.18	348	1.158	11.32	
1946	AL	Hal Newhouser ^{†}	Detroit Tigers	26–9	1.94	275	1.069	9.83	
1947	NL	Ewell Blackwell	Cincinnati Reds	22–8	2.47	193	1.179	7.59	
1947	NL	Warren Spahn ^{†}	Boston Braves	21–10	2.33	123	1.136	7.20	
1946	NL	Howie Pollet	St. Louis Cardinals	21–10	2.10	107	1.180	7.03	
1946	NL	Johnny Sain	Boston Braves	20–14	2.21	129	1.177	6.99	

== Organizations ==
The Los Angeles Dodgers are the only organization whose pitchers have won the Pitcher of the Year Award in 5 consecutive years: 1962–1966 (Don Drysdale and Sandy Koufax) and 2013–2017 (Kershaw, Greinke and Jansen). Los Angeles (Brooklyn) Dodgers pitchers have won the award 18 times ^{b}; Atlanta (Boston and Milwaukee) Braves pitchers have won the award 13 times. The following three (3) organizations have never had a pitcher win the award: Cincinnati Reds, Colorado Rockies, and Texas Rangers.

The Detroit Tigers have three pitchers who have won consecutive awards — Hal Newhouser (1944–1945), Denny McLain (1968–1969) and Justin Verlander (2011–2012). Each was also Player of the Year and AL MVP at least once while being Pitcher of the Year.

The Atlanta (Boston and Milwaukee) Braves also have three pitchers who have won consecutive awards — Warren Spahn (1957–1958), Greg Maddux (1992–1995) and Craig Kimbrel (2013–2014).

Rank	Team	# of Awards	Years
1	Los Angeles/Brooklyn Dodgers	18	1951, 1956, 1962–1966, 1974, 1981, 1988, 2003, 2011, 2013–2017, 2021
2	Atlanta/Milwaukee/Boston Braves	15	1948, 1953, 1957–1958, 1961, 1991, 1993–1996, 2000, 2013–2014, 2024(2)
3	Cleveland Indians/Guardians	12	1948, 1950–1951, 1954, 1962, 1970, 2007–2008, 2016, 2020, 2022, 2024
4	Detroit Tigers	11	1944–1945, 1968–1969, 1981, 1984, 2011–2013, 2024-2025
4	New York Yankees	11	1955, 1958, 1961, 1963, 1978, 1994, 2001, 2014–2015, 2021, 2023
6	Boston Red Sox	10	1949, 1967, 1986, 1991, 1999, 2000, 2017(2), 2018, 2025
7	New York Mets	9	1969, 1975, 1985, 2012, 2018–2020, 2022, 2025
7	Philadelphia Phillies	9	1950, 1952, 1955, 1972, 1977, 1980, 1982–1983, 2010
7	San Francisco/New York Giants	9	1944, 1954, 1959, 1967, 1973, 1978, 2004, 2008–2009
10	Baltimore Orioles	9	1960, 1973, 1975–1976, 1979–1980, 2016, 2023
10	Oakland/Philadelphia Athletics	9	1952, 1971, 1974, 1990, 1992, 2002, 2019–2020
12	Chicago White Sox	7	1956–1957, 1959, 1972, 1983, 1993, 2021
13	Houston Astros	6	1979, 1986, 1999, 2015, 2019, 2022
13	Minnesota Twins/Washington Senators	6	1953, 1965–1966, 1988, 2004, 2006
13	San Diego Padres	6	1976, 1989, 1998, 2007, 2019, 2023
13	St. Louis Cardinals	6	1949, 1968, 1970, 2005–2006, 2024
13	Toronto Blue Jays	6	1982, 1987, 1996–1998, 2003
17	Chicago Cubs	5	1945, 1971, 1984, 1987, 1992
19	Kansas City Royals	4	1985, 1989, 2009, 2013
19	Milwaukee Brewers	4	2018, 2020, 2021, 2023
19	Washington Nationals/Montreal Expos	4	1997, 2016, 2017, 2021
19	Pittsburgh Pirates	4	1960, 1990, 2015, 2025
19	Seattle Mariners	4	1995, 2010, 2014, 2018
24	Los Angeles (California) Angels (of Anaheim)	3	1964, 1977, 2005
25	Arizona Diamondbacks	2	2001–2002
26	Miami Marlins	1	2022
26	Tampa Bay Rays	1	2012
28	Cincinnati Reds	0	none
28	Colorado Rockies	0	none
28	Texas Rangers	0	none

== See also ==
- Baseball Writers' Association of America Relief Pitcher of the Year Award
- List of Major League Baseball awards
- The Sporting News MLB Player of the Year Award
- The Sporting News Most Valuable Player Award
- The Sporting News Rookie of the Year Award
- The Sporting News Comeback Player of the Year Award
- Sporting News Reliever of the Year Award (discontinued)
- The Sporting News Manager of the Year Award
- The Sporting News Executive of the Year Award
- Baseball awards

== Notes ==
^{a} Sutfliffe statistics are for the NL only. His AL win–loss: 4–5, era: 5.15 and 58 strikeouts are not included.
^{b} Max Scherzer was traded in July 2021 from Washington National to Los Angeles Dodgers. His award is credited to both teams.
