= The Sporting News Most Valuable Player Award =

American baseball award (1929–1946)

The Sporting News established The Sporting News Most Valuable Player Award in 1929. The award was given annually to the player, who TSN baseball experts judged as the most valuable player in each league. The awards were discontinued in 1946.

== Key ==
*	Also named TSN Player of the Year
^{†}	Member of the National Baseball Hall of Fame and Museum

== Awardees ==
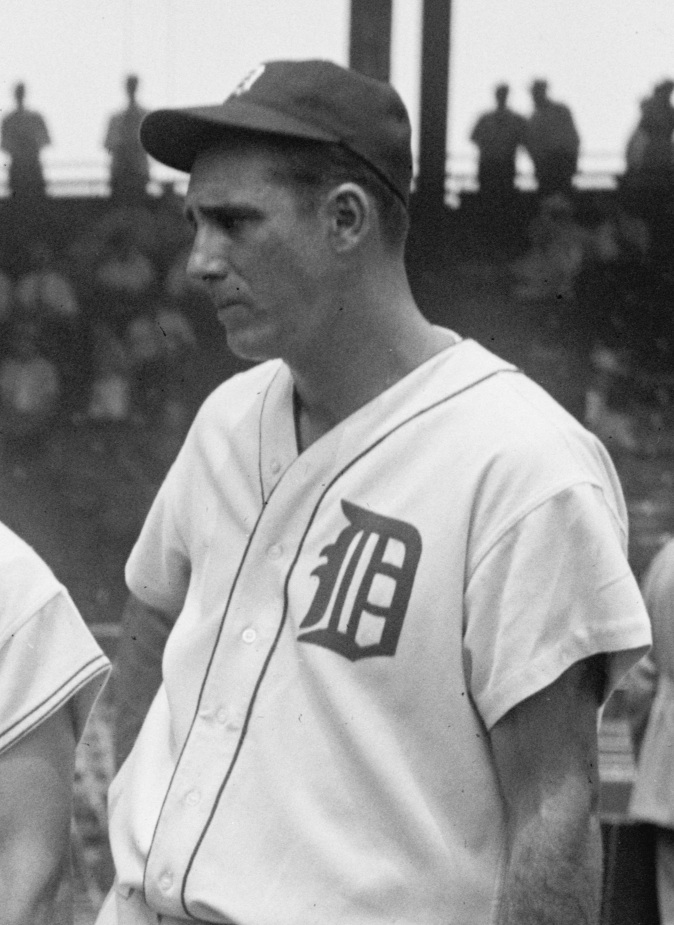
Hank Greenberg, Hall of Famer and 2-time MVP

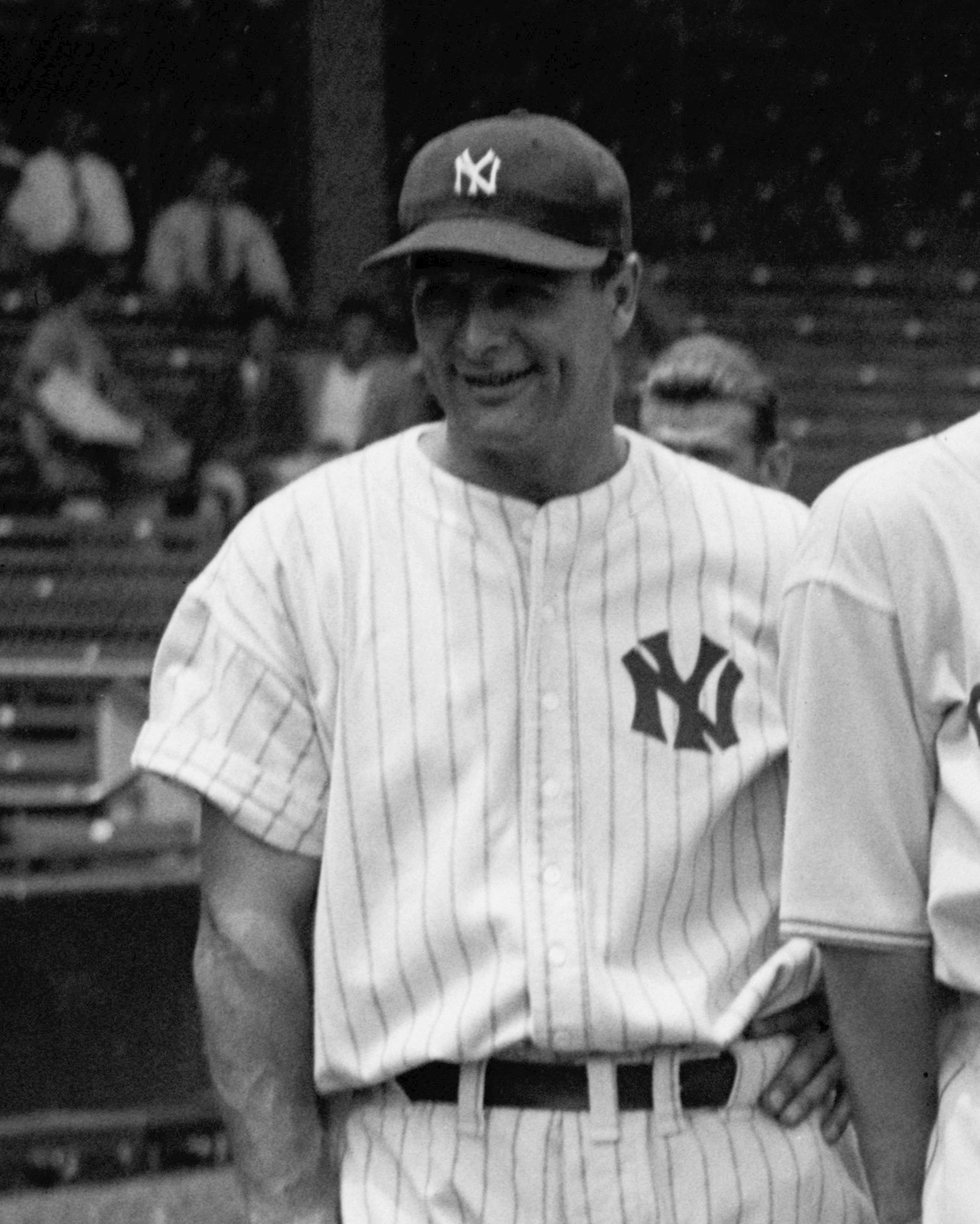
Lou Gehrig, Hall of Famer and 3-time MVP

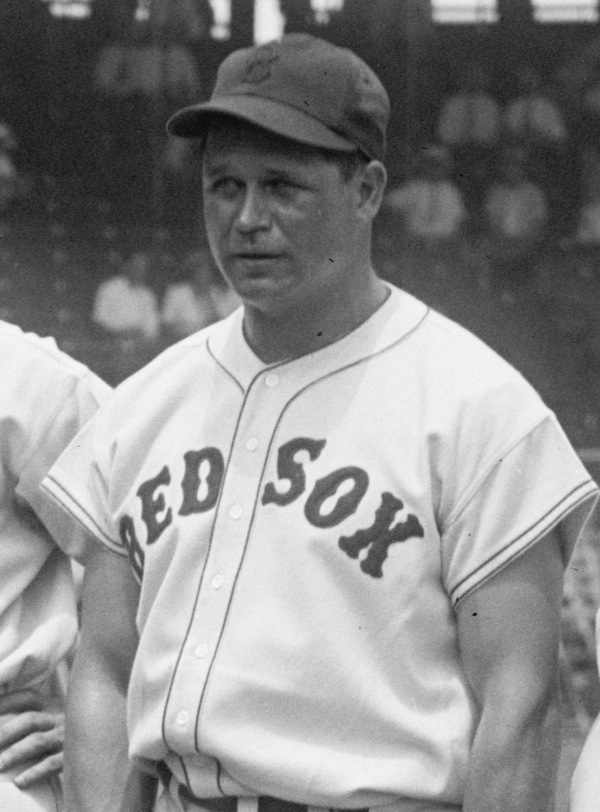
Jimmie Foxx, Hall of Famer and 3-time MVP

Year	American League	Club	National League	Club
1929	Al Simmons^{†}	Philadelphia Athletics	None	N/A
1930	Joe Cronin^{†}	Washington Senators	Bill Terry^{†}	New York Giants
1931	Lou Gehrig^{†(1)}	New York Yankees	Chuck Klein^{†(1)}	Philadelphia Phillies
1932	Jimmie Foxx^{†(1)}	Philadelphia Athletics	Chuck Klein^{†(2)}	Philadelphia Phillies
1933	Jimmie Foxx^{†(2)}	Philadelphia Athletics	Carl Hubbell^{†(1)}	New York Giants
1934	Lou Gehrig^{†(2)}	New York Yankees	Dizzy Dean^{†}	St. Louis Cardinals
1935	Hank Greenberg^{†(1)}	Detroit Tigers	Arky Vaughan^{†}	Pittsburgh Pirates
1936	Lou Gehrig^{†(3)}	New York Yankees	Carl Hubbell^{†(2)} *	New York Giants
1937	Charlie Gehringer^{†}	Detroit Tigers	Joe Medwick^{†}	St. Louis Cardinals
1938	Jimmie Foxx^{†(3)}	Boston Red Sox	Ernie Lombardi^{†}	Cincinnati Reds
1939	Joe DiMaggio^{†(1)} *	New York Yankees	Bucky Walters	Cincinnati Reds
1940	Hank Greenberg^{†(2)}	Detroit Tigers	Frank McCormick	Cincinnati Reds
1941	Joe DiMaggio^{†(2)}	New York Yankees	Dolph Camilli	Brooklyn Dodgers
1942	Joe Gordon^{†}	New York Yankees	Mort Cooper	St. Louis Cardinals
1943	Spud Chandler *	New York Yankees	Stan Musial^{†}	St. Louis Cardinals
1944	Bobby Doerr^{†}	Boston Red Sox	Marty Marion *	St. Louis Cardinals
1945	Eddie Mayo	Detroit Tigers	Tommy Holmes	Boston Braves

== Multiple Wins ==
Lou Gehrig and Jimmie Foxx have won the award three times. Every player who won the award more than once are member of the National Baseball Hall of Fame and Museum

Pitcher	# of Awards	Years
Lou Gehrig ^{†}	3	1931, 1934, 1936
Jimmie Foxx ^{†}	3	1932, 1933, 1938
Chuck Klein ^{†}	2	1931, 1932
Carl Hubbell ^{†}	2	1933, 1936
Hank Greenberg ^{†}	2	1935, 1940
Joe DiMaggio ^{†}	2	1939, 1941

== See also ==
- Sporting News Player of the Year Award
- TSN Pitcher of the Year
- TSN Rookie of the Year
- SN Reliever of the Year
- TSN Comeback Player of the Year
- TSN Manager of the Year
- TSN Executive of the Year
- Baseball awards § United States

== External links and references ==
- Baseball-Almanac.com
