= MTCC =

MTCC may refer to:

- Metro Toronto Convention Centre
- McCormick Tribune Campus Center, Chicago
- Maldives Transport and Contracting Company, a public company operating public bus and ferry services in the Maldives
