= Illinois Institute of Technology Academic Campus =

University campus in Chicago, Illinois

- U.S. National Register of Historic Places
- U.S. Historic district
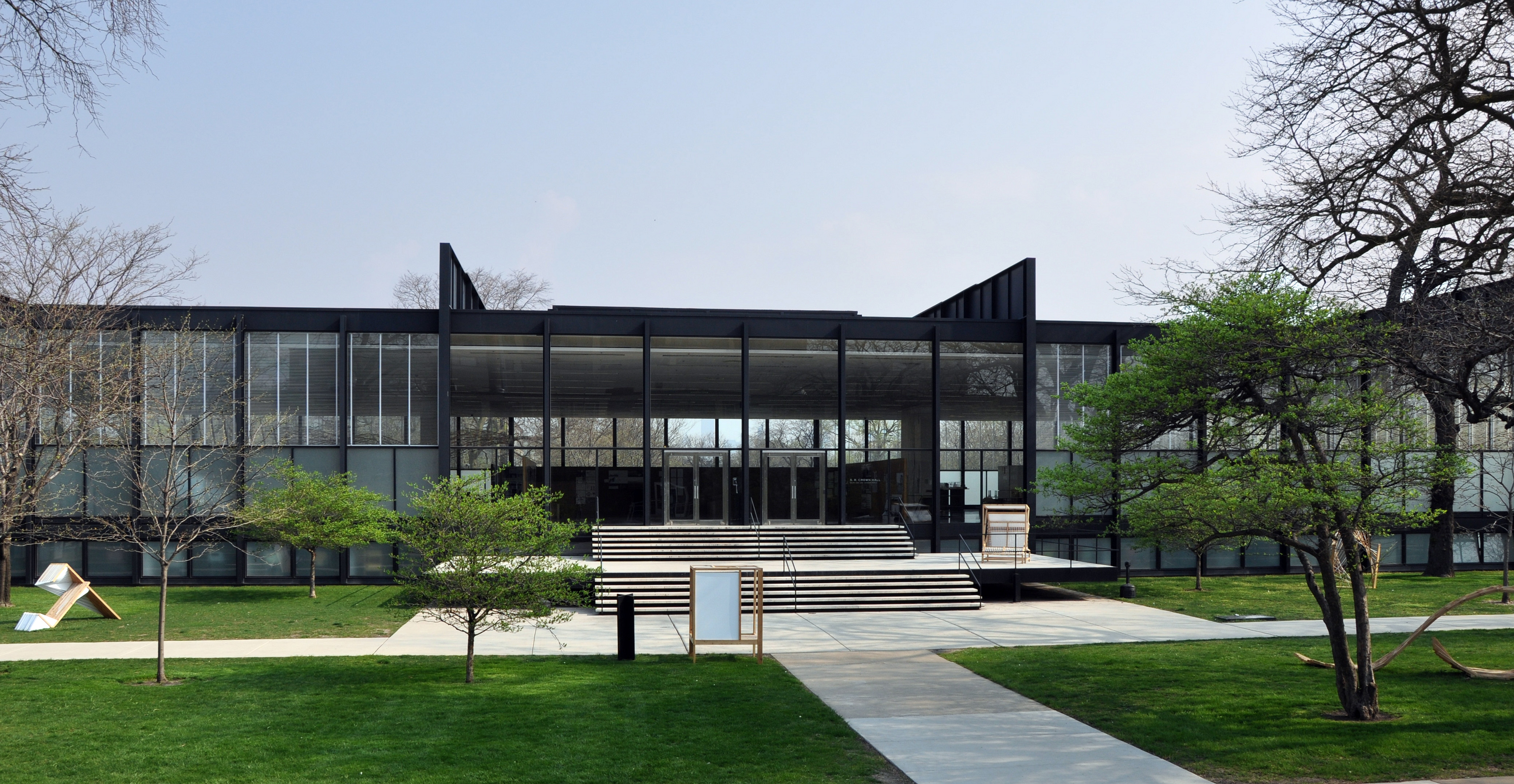
- S. R. Crown Hall, one of the buildings on the campus

- Location within Chicago metropolitan area Location within Illinois Location within the United States
- Location: Roughly bounded by 31st St., State St., 35th St. and the Dan Ryan Expressway, Chicago, Illinois
- Coordinates: 41°50′06″N 87°37′42″W
- Area: 60 acres (24 ha)
- Built: 1893, 1902, 1943–1971 (NRHP-listed buildings)
- Architect: Patten & Fisher; Ludwig Mies van der Rohe; Skidmore, Owings, & Merrill; Schmidt, Garden & Erikson
- Architectural style: Romanesque, Miesian
- NRHP reference No.: 05000871
- Added to NRHP: August 12, 2005

The Illinois Institute of Technology Academic Campus (or Main Campus) is one of the five campuses of the Illinois Institute of Technology (IIT), located in Bronzeville on the South Side of Chicago, Illinois, United States. It is roughly bounded by 30th Street, Michigan Avenue, 35th Street, and the Rock Island District railroad line. Parts of the campus, comprising 26 buildings between 31st, State, and 35th streets and the Rock Island railroad, are designated as a National Register of Historic Places (NRHP) historic district. The campus includes buildings constructed both by IIT and one of its predecessors, the Armour Institute, which was established in the neighborhood in 1890. Its layout is derived from a master plan devised in the 1940s by Ludwig Mies van der Rohe, the director of IIT's architecture school from 1938 to 1958.

The Armour Institute included five buildings; three of the remaining structures are part of the NRHP district. These buildings were all designed by Patton & Fisher (later Patton, Fisher & Miller) in the Romanesque style, with red brick and stone facades. When the Armour Institute merged with the Lewis Institute in 1940, Mies was hired to design a master plan for IIT's campus. The first building under his master plan was completed in 1943, and Mies continued to oversee the design until his resignation in 1958. Mies's designs are generally low-rise structures with concrete or steel exterior frames and brick-and-glass facades, although some designs, such as S. R. Crown Hall, deviated from this trend.

After Mies's resignation, Walter Netsch and Myron Goldsmith of Skidmore, Owings, & Merrill (SOM) each designed multiple buildings for the campus, largely adhering to Mies's designs. The local firm of Schmidt, Garden & Erikson designed additional buildings for the IIT Research Institute (IITRI). SOM and another firm, Mittelbusher & Tourtelot, designed additional buildings such as dormitories and fraternity houses, which are not included in the NRHP district. After Mies's master plan was completed in 1971, no significant construction occurred for more than two decades. Rem Koolhaas's McCormick Tribune Campus Center and Helmut Jahn's State Street Village were both completed in 2003, and a technology building by John Ronan Architects opened in 2018.

== Site ==
The main campus of the Illinois Institute of Technology (IIT) is located in Bronzeville, on the South Side of Chicago, Illinois, United States. It is one of five IIT campuses, the others being in the Chicago Loop, the Fulton Market in central Chicago, and the suburbs of Bedford Park and Wheaton. The main campus covers 22 blocks roughly bounded by 30th Street to the north, Michigan Avenue to the east, 35th Street to the south, and the Chicago, Rock Island and Pacific Railroad (now Metra's Rock Island District) tracks to the west. Federal Street, Dearborn Street, State Street, and Wabash Avenue (from west to east) run north–south through the campus. Additionally, 32nd, 33rd, and 34th streets run west–east through the campus. The Chicago "L" has two stations at the campus: the 35th–Bronzeville–IIT station on the Green Line and the Sox–35th station on the Red Line. The Rock Island District's 35th Street station also serves the campus.

The main campus includes buildings constructed both by IIT and one of its predecessors, the Armour Institute. The Armour Institute buildings were designed by Patton & Fisher in the late 19th and early 20th centuries, while many of IIT's original buildings were designed by Ludwig Mies van der Rohe in the 1940s and 1950s. Walter Netsch and Myron Goldsmith of Skidmore, Owings, & Merrill (SOM) took over in the 1960s, each designing multiple buildings, and the local firm of Schmidt, Garden & Erikson designed additional buildings for the IIT Research Institute (IITRI). Several associated architects were involved in the design, including Holabird & Root, Alschuler & Sincere, and Pace Architects.

The landscaping was done by Alfred Caldwell, a close collaborator of Mies. Caldwell's plan reinforced the design with "landscaping planted in a free-flowing manner, which in its interaction with the pristine qualities of the architecture, introduce[d] a poetic aspect." At 33rd and State streets is a symmetrical fountain designed by Goldsmith, marking the campus's main entrance. There is also a painted rock near Hermann Hall, which was donated to Armour Institute in 1893; it is often used for displaying messages. George Segal's 1986 sculpture Man on a Bench, built for Mies's 100th birthday, stands near Hermann and Perlstein halls.

== History ==
=== Initial development ===
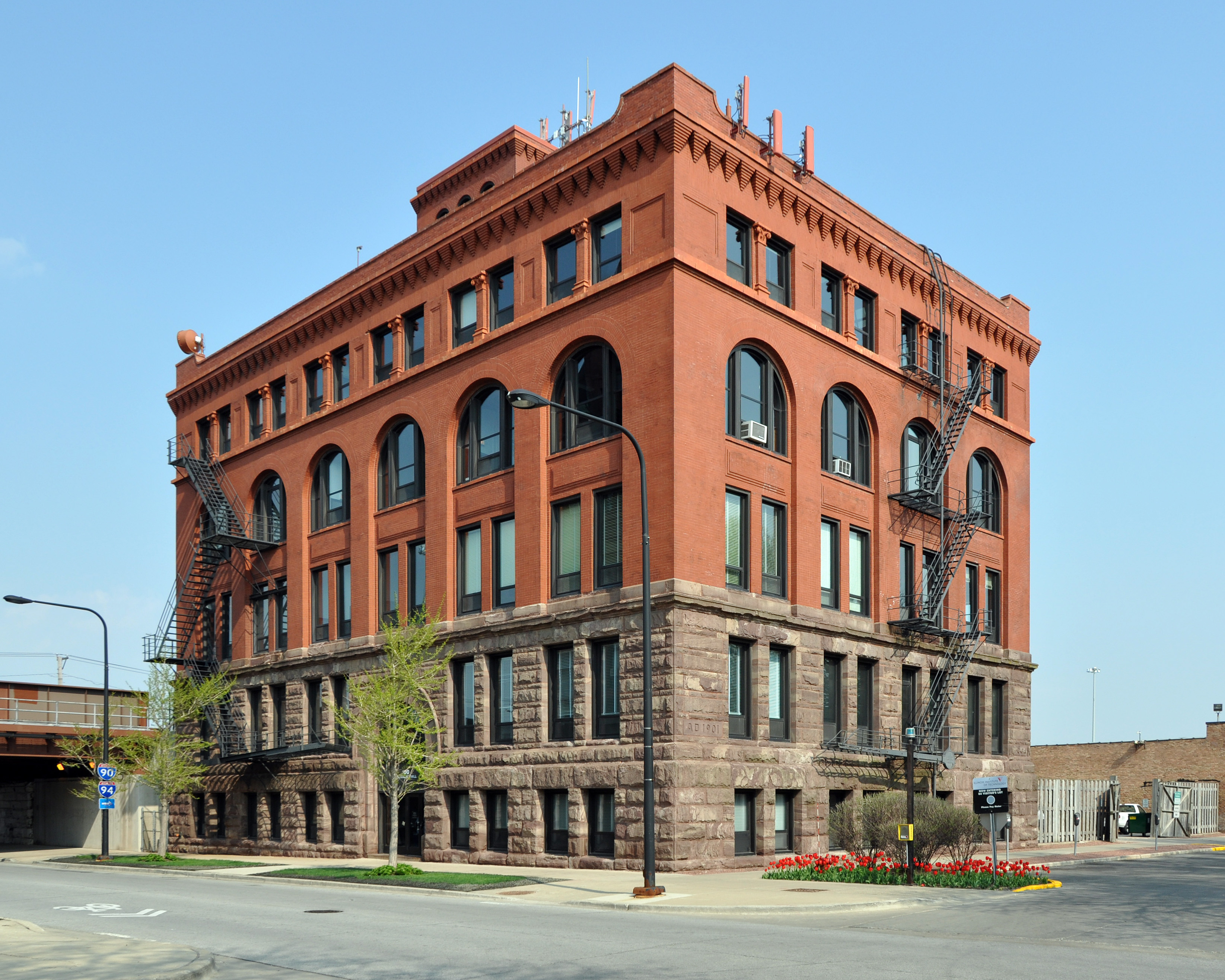
IIT Machinery Hall, one of the oldest extant buildings on the campus

The oldest buildings were built for the Armour Institute, a technology school established in 1890 by Philip Danforth Armour and originally headed by Frank W. Gunsaulus. The campus originally consisted of five structures and was centered around Armour Avenue (now Federal Street) and 33rd Street on the South Side of Chicago, near the Plymouth Mission School, which P. D. Armour had helped found. It initially spanned 7 acres (2.8 ha).

The college first used some space in the Armour Flats, which P. D. Armour donated to the college in 1892. It also had space in the Armour Mission Building, built in 1886 at the southeast corner of Federal and 33rd streets. The Armour Institute then constructed its Main Building, financed by a $1.5 million gift from Armour. The college began holding classes in 1893, when the Main Building opened. This building was expanded to the south c. 1900. Plans for an additional building were announced in 1901, following a gift from Armour's wife; this became Machinery Hall, completed in 1902. The Armour Flats were largely razed in 1918, but parts of that building survived another half-century.

=== IIT formation and Mies era ===
By the 1930s, the Armour Institute wished to relocate due to deteriorating quality of life in the neighborhood. The Armour Institute bought land on Lake Michigan, between Ontario and Erie streets in the Streeterville neighborhood of the Near North Side, in 1935. The college planned to spend $2 million on new structures there, while the old South Side campus would have been sold and repurposed. Ultimately, college officials decided to expand the existing campus rather than relocate. The Armour Institute began buying up property around its campus in the late 1930s; they eventually acquired 30 acres (12 ha), covering more than 3,000 land lots. The old Armour Mission building was renovated into a student union building in 1938. The Armour Institute agreed in 1939 to merge with another polytechnic college, the Lewis Institute, and IIT was formed the next year when the merger was completed. IIT continued its predecessor's efforts to redevelop and expand the Armour Institute campus.

==== Design ====
Holabird & Root, whose employees included Armour Institute professor John Augur Holabird, started devising plans for the new campus in 1937. Alfred S. Alschuler, a trustee of Armour Institute and later IIT, had been tasked with preparing an alternate plan; although IIT's president Henry Townley Heald did not like the plan, he also did not want to publicly disclose his opinion. Heald privately requested another set of plans from the architect Ludwig Mies van der Rohe, who had been hired in 1938 to lead Armour's (and later IIT's) school of architecture. After Alschuler died in 1940, Mies was commissioned to design the campus. Heald later said that Mies's selection had been "an act of God", given that the IIT trustees were unaware of Mies's proposal until Alschuler's death. Mies, whose entire career portfolio to date had consisted of 17 buildings, would become responsible for designing about 20 more at IIT alone. (Note: Mies is variously cited as having designed 18, 19, 20, 21, or 22 buildings for the Illinois Tech campus.) Mies originally worked on the plans with his administrative assistant John Barney Rodgers and his draftsman George Danforth, and he also collaborated with Ludwig Hilberseimer, a coworker he knew from the Bauhaus art school in Germany. The landscape architect Alfred Caldwell began working on the plans as well in 1944.

The design of the IIT campus was a large undertaking, comparable to Thomas Jefferson's University of Virginia campus plan, and doubled as a slum clearance project for the area. The new campus's development required clearing several blocks between 32nd and 34th streets, forcing hundreds of families to be relocated. Mies contemplated several alternative campus layouts, including one with curved pathways, before deciding to build his campus on the existing Chicago street grid. Mies's drawings envisioned closing off Dearborn and Federal streets, which ran north–south through the site. The street closures would create superblocks, permitting greater flexibility in the arrangement of these buildings. Most of the structures would have been built on a grid of 24-by-24-by-12-foot (7.3 by 7.3 by 3.7 m) half-cubes, but the library and administration buildings would have used even larger modules.

The plans originally called for two groups of buildings arranged symmetrically along 33rd Street, with several buildings to be raised on stilts. The drawings were modified after the city refused to allow Dearborn Street to be closed. After several revisions, Mies decided upon a campus of low-rise, flat-roofed buildings, all with steel frames. Mies removed the stilts from the plans to save money, and he decided against including features such as protruding auditoriums and staircases. The final plans called for a group of structures that appeared to be "sliding" past each other, as seen from above. The buildings were to be surrounded by large amounts of green space, as Mies wanted IIT to be a "campus in a park". Though the arrangement of buildings would be asymmetric, the structures themselves would be symmetrical.

==== 1940s construction ====
In 1941, IIT announced plans to spend $12 million on the new campus. Of the first six structures, two would be administration or humanities buildings, and the other four would be engineering buildings; all would have steel superstructures, glass and brick facades, and open plan interiors. IIT initially sought to raise $3 million. The same year, IIT announced plans for several other buildings serving the institute. The Materials & Minerals Building began construction in 1941 and was completed two years later, becoming both the new campus's first structure and Mies's first U.S. design. The next building, for engineering research, began construction in late 1943 and was finished two years later, being the only other IIT building completed during World War II. The construction of buildings unrelated to the war effort was deprioritized, forcing development of the rest of the campus to be postponed. Wartime steel shortages also prompted changes in several buildings' designs, such as the use of concrete superstructures and custom steel windows. IIT temporarily occupied space at 23 locations across Chicago during the war.

IIT's trustees approved a $13.2 million expansion plan in April 1945, which included 16 new buildings on campus. That May, Heald announced that the buildings would be constructed when funding became available. The first building developed under this plan, the Navy Building (now Alumni Memorial Hall), started construction in July 1945 and was finished by the next year. After the war, many World War II veterans took advantage of the G.I. Bill to enroll in IIT, and the college began constructing two buildings per year to accommodate demand. Heald announced in March 1947 that five dormitory buildings would be built first, to meet the high demand for student housing, and he announced plans for additional housing that November. By the end of the year, four or five structures were under construction, with three additional structures having been completed. In addition, the university finished a temporary athletics building that year.

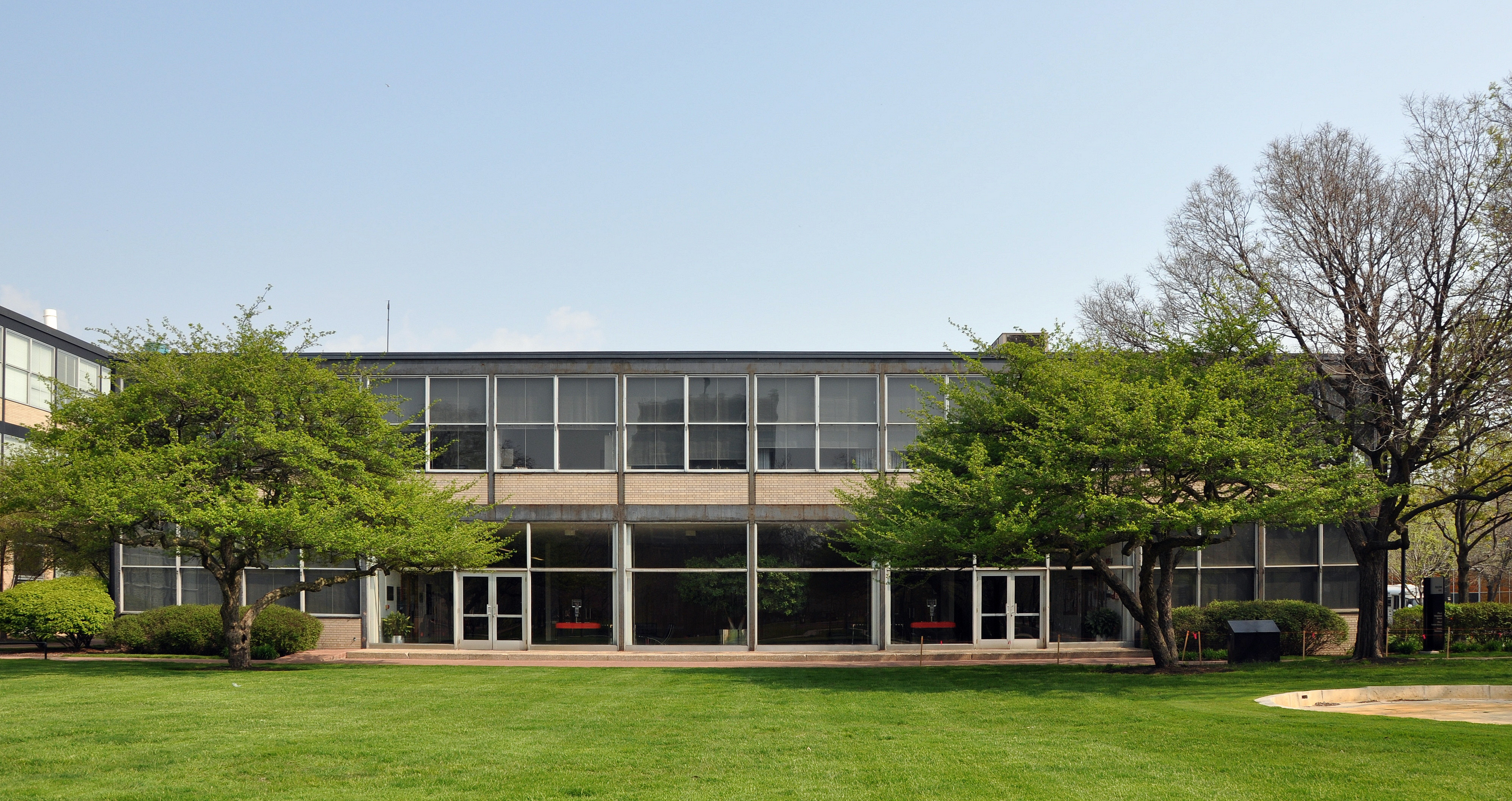
Perlstein Hall, one of the earlier buildings on the IIT campus

Initially, most of the new buildings (such as the boiler building and Alumni Memorial, Wishnick, and Perlstein halls) were built north of 33rd Street due to the presence of Mecca Flats south of that point. IIT had acquired Mecca Flats in 1941 with the intention of clearing the site to make way for the new campus. Renters' court judge Samuel Heller had prevented the tenants' eviction in 1943, and local tenants' groups and legislators also opposed Mecca Flats' destruction, citing the wartime housing shortage. The first modern-style laboratory building, Wishnick Hall (the Chemistry Building), was completed in February 1948, and Skidmore, Owings, & Merrill (SOM) completed the campus's first dormitories, Farr and Fowler halls, that year. The Association of American Railroads (AAR) announced plans the same year to construct a research facility on the IIT campus. The AAR facility, between 31st and 32nd streets next to the Rock Island railroad tracks, was to include three buildings. Work on the first AAR building began in 1949, as did construction on a building for the Institute of Gas Technology. The AAR laboratory opened in March 1950. By then, ten buildings had been developed as part of the new campus, including seven by Mies.

==== 1950s construction ====
After enough of Mecca Flats' residents had moved away, IIT announced plans to clear that site again in 1950 and razed it two years later. IIT simultaneously acquired several land lots and razed 29 structures in 1952. John Rettaliata became IIT's administrator that year; during the next three years, the college acquired 72 additional lots and began constructing nine more buildings. The VanderCook College of Music and Chicago College of Optometry both moved to the IIT campus in 1953. The College of Optometry built its structure at Michigan Avenue, just outside the campus, while VanderCook built its structure within the IIT campus on Federal Street, hiring Mies to design its building. Other structures were under development during the early 1950s, such as the Carr Memorial Chapel and the Life Sciences Research Building. Also during that time, four dormitory buildings were built near the north end of campus, on 31st Street, and a student commons building was erected.

To fund the completion of the new campus, IIT sought to raise $20 million in the 1950s, in addition to the $10 million it already had. IIT focused particularly heavily on developing dormitories for its students. By 1954, the college had developed or was developing nearly 20 buildings under Mies's master plan. Among the structures under development were a second building for the AAR, as well as architecture–design and physics–engineering buildings. At the time, IIT owned 90 acres (36 ha) and was planning to obtain another 20 acres (8.1 ha). The city's land-clearance commission announced in 1955 that it would help IIT obtain the remaining land for the campus.

The architecture–design building, S. R. Crown Hall, opened in 1956. Other projects carried out during the mid-1950s included a northward expansion of the Materials & Metals Building, the Institute of Gas Technology's Physics and Electrical Engineering Research Building, a third AAR building, and the Bailey Hall and Cunningham Hall dormitories. By 1957, IIT had acquired 1,100 land lots for the new campus and anticipated buying 150 more lots. Mies resigned from his positions as IIT's campus architect and architecture director in 1958; by then, he was 72 years old and was busy with his own architectural practice. He had designed up to 22 buildings on the campus. Mies also designed a library–administration building with a large mezzanine and interior courtyard, which was not completed.

=== Post-Mies era ===
==== Completion of Mies plan ====
After Mies resigned, SOM and Schmidt, Garden & Erikson took over as the campus architects, designing several Mies–inspired structures. Many of the later structures adhered to his original plan. In 1959, IIT announced plans for a library building near the south end of campus, and the AAR announced plans for a fourth building. In addition, IIT began developing buildings for fraternities and sororities along Michigan Avenue between 33rd and 34th streets; work on these buildings began in September 1959. The Chicago City Council voted the same year to rezone the IIT campus to accommodate the college's expansion over the next decade and a half. By 1960, the new campus was two-thirds finished, with forty of the campus's sixty planned buildings either under construction or completed. IIT anticipated closing portions of Wabash Avenue, 32nd Street, and 34th Street to create superblocks for the development of the final buildings.

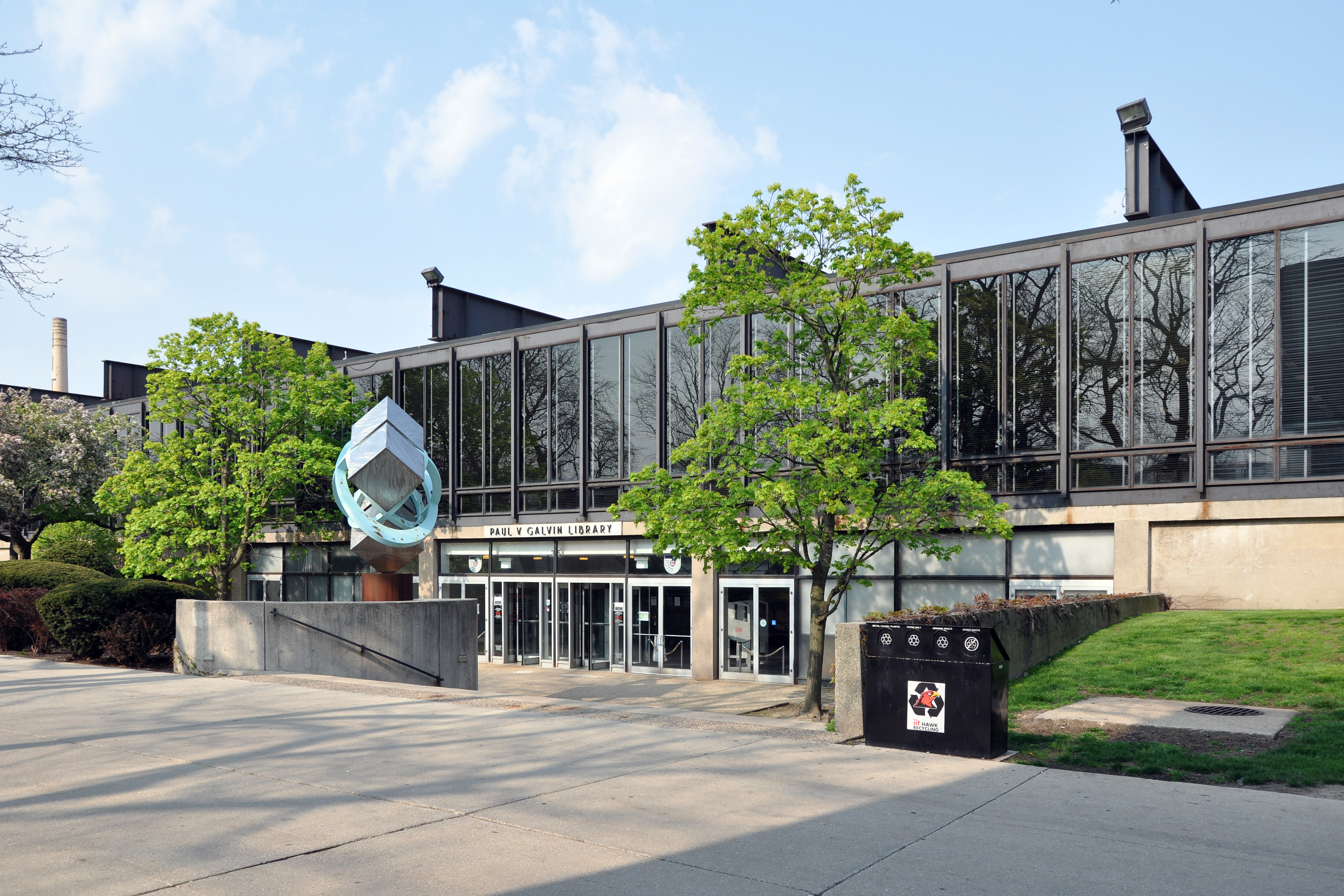
The Galvin Library, completed in 1962

IIT announced plans in late 1961 to spend $50 million developing a research complex just south of the campus. Around the same time, IIT demolished the original Armour Mission to make way for Hermann Hall, and the John Crerar Library agreed to relocate to a new building (later the Galvin Library) shared with IIT's library. Hermann Hall and the library both opened in 1962. Other structures announced during the early 1960s included a new building for the Institute of Gas Technology on State Street; a tower for the IIT Research Institute, which would become the tallest building on campus; and two additional dormitories at Michigan Avenue and 33rd Street.

In May 1965, IIT began raising $25 million to construct six buildings. These included a gymnasium, more dormitories, a dining hall, a life-science building, and two engineering buildings. The college raised $9 million within six months and had reached half its fundraising goal in less than a year. Work on the life-science building began in 1965, followed by the gymnasium (known as Keating Hall) and the first of the engineering buildings in 1966. By that May, IIT had raised all $25 million for the campus expansion, and four of the buildings had been finished. The completion of the life-science building permitted the biology department to move out of the Armour Flats, which were razed in 1967. The Engineering I Building was finished in 1968, followed by the other engineering building, Stuart Hall, in 1971. When the master plan was finished, the campus had 50 structures. IIT obtained several structures east of State Street and demolished them. Since the Chicago "L"'s South Side Elevated (used by the Green Line) ran directly behind the destroyed buildings, this created noise pollution throughout the rest of the campus.

==== Late 20th century ====
After finishing Mies's master plan in 1971, IIT did not build any additional structures for more than two decades. Lewis Collens, a later president of IIT, said that Mies's master plan had "allowed for renovations rather than replacements", making it unnecessary to construct new structures. The college made plans to repair four of the buildings in 1978, and it renovated the library in 1985. During the early 1980s, IIT acquired a neighboring church on Michigan Avenue with plans to convert it into a parking lot. The college contemplated expanding its campus again but canceled these plans due to local opposition. Ultimately, IIT acquired a satellite campus in Wheaton, Illinois, and it built more campuses in Bedford Park and in the Chicago Loop. The Robert R. McCormick Trust provided $8 million in 1989 for the renovation of several buildings. During the early 1990s, the IITRI Tower was renovated, and IIT built a cogeneration plant. IIT had also acquired dozens of tracts east of the campus, in an area known as "the Gap", which contained houses in varying states of repair. The Institute of Gas Technology moved out of the IIT campus in 1993, and the AAR moved away in 1995.

The college created a commission in 1993 to review the campus and devise a master plan; the commission's report, published the next year, predicted that it would cost $50 million to renovate the buildings. Since the surrounding neighborhood's social decline had negatively impacted enrollment, IIT considered closing the South Side campus and relocating to the suburbs. Several large developments nearby, such as a new police headquarters, the new Rate Field, and the expanded McCormick Place convention center, convinced IIT to stay. Lohan Associates, led by Mies's grandson Dirk Lohan, was hired to design the master plan, presenting plans to IIT's trustees in 1995 or 1996. The proposal included $70 million in renovations, which was expected to help revitalize the neighborhood. IIT sought to raise $250 million or $270 million for the master plan. In late 1996, Bob Galvin and Robert Pritzker each offered $60 million in matching funds, some of which would be used for the campus renovation.

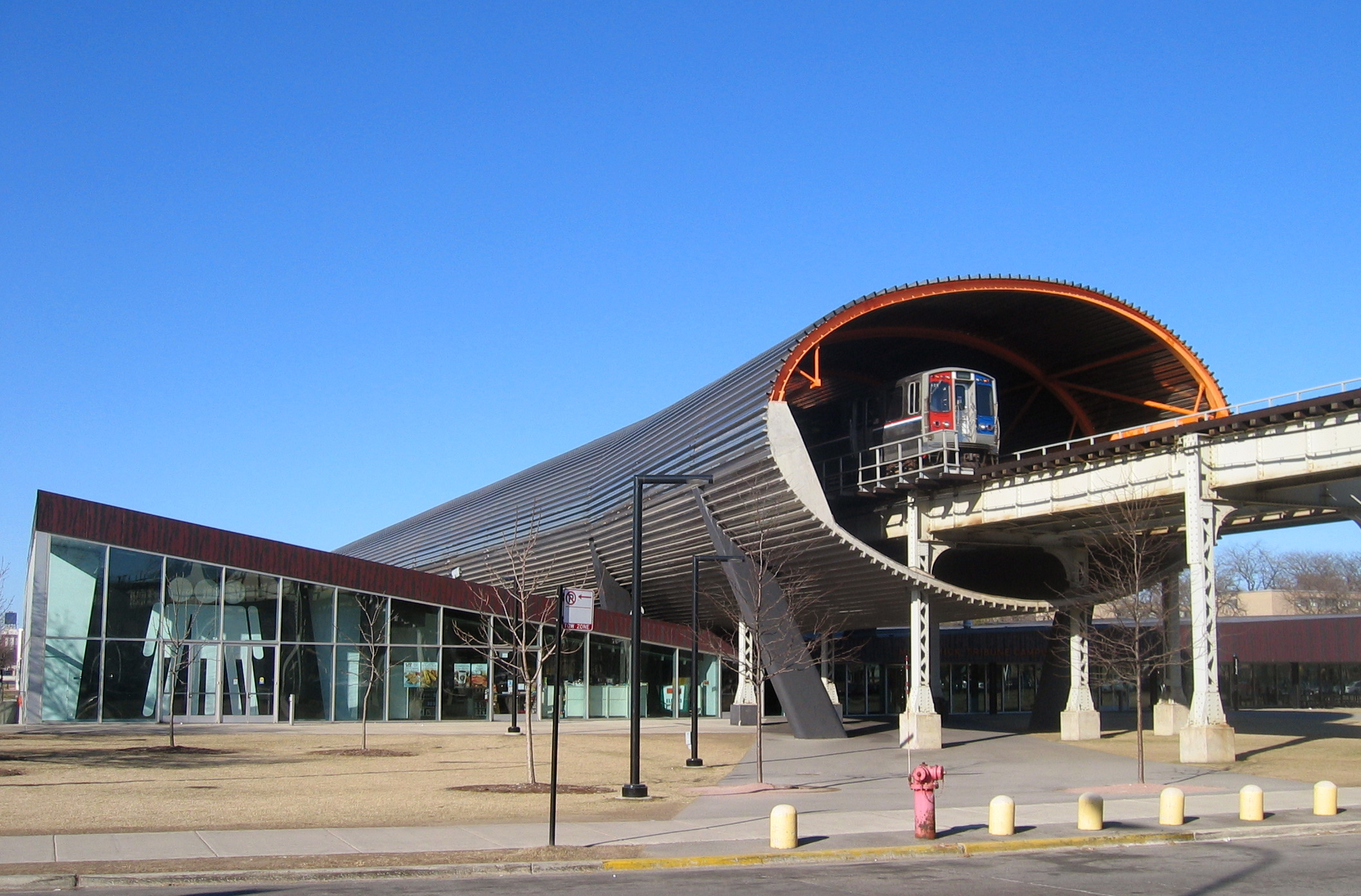
The McCormick Tribune Campus Center, built as part of the 1990s master plan

The main component of the master plan was a new student center, which was necessitated because the existing student center at Hermann Hall was too far from the east side of campus. IIT already owned the land for the building, which was named the McCormick Tribune Campus Center after the McCormick family donated $10 million for its construction. IIT invited 56 architects to an architectural design competition for the student center, selecting five finalist designs. (Note: Namely, Helmut Jahn, Peter Eisenman, Zaha Hadid, Rem Koolhaas, and the partnership of Kazuyo Sejima and Ryue Nishizawa) Rem Koolhaas won the competition in February 1998; at the time, the student center was supposed to be completed in 2000. IIT also received a grant to construct a noise-dampening tube around the portion of the South Side Elevated that ran above the building's site. This tube had to be constructed before work on the campus center could start. As part of the master plan, Peter Lindsay Schaudt was hired to re-landscape parts of the campus as well.

==== Early 21st century ====
Work on the campus center was delayed due to a dispute over whether it should be set back from the adjacent Commons building. Helmut Jahn, one of the runner-ups for the campus center design, won a subsequent competition for the State Street Village dormitory buildings at State and 33rd streets, beating out seven competitors. Work on Jahn's dormitories, just south of the campus center, began in May 2002, and they were completed in July 2003. This was followed in September by Koolhaas's new campus center, which was Koolhaas's first design to be completed in the U.S. The dormitories and campus center were the campus's first major new structures in several decades and were intended to complement Mies's original designs. Crain's Chicago Business described the new buildings as "both a sign of what has occurred and a catalyst for further change", referring to how IIT's enrollment, grant funding, and research activity had all increased over the previous decade.

A microgrid, or small power grid, was installed at the campus in the late 2000s to protect the buildings from sudden power outages. Around that time, IIT president John Anderson sought to construct a technology research building to attract researchers and students. IIT announced in 2012 that it would spend $30 million to construct a five-story technological innovation building. The structure was the first academic building on campus since Stuart Hall in 1971 (Note: The only other non-service structures built during this period, the McCormick Tribune Campus Center and State Street Village, had not been academic buildings.) and was named for Ed Kaplan, an IIT alumnus who donated $11 million to help found the innovation center. Work on the Kaplan Institute building began in 2016, and it was completed in October 2018. IIT sold the Armour Institute Main Building to a developer in 2017, and several of the dormitories were renovated in the 2020s. IIT students relandscaped a 1.2-acre (0.49 ha) area between Hermann Hall and Galvin Library in 2025, converting it into a prairie.

== Landmarked buildings ==
Twenty-six of the buildings are listed on the National Register of Historic Places (NRHP) as part of the Illinois Institute of Technology Academic Campus historic district. These include three of Armour's original buildings from the 1890s and 1900s; fourteen buildings designed by the modernist architect Ludwig Mies van der Rohe in the 1940s and 1950s; and nine buildings constructed afterward. The historic district covers a narrower area bounded by 31st, State, and 35th streets and the Rock Island railroad tracks.

=== Original buildings ===
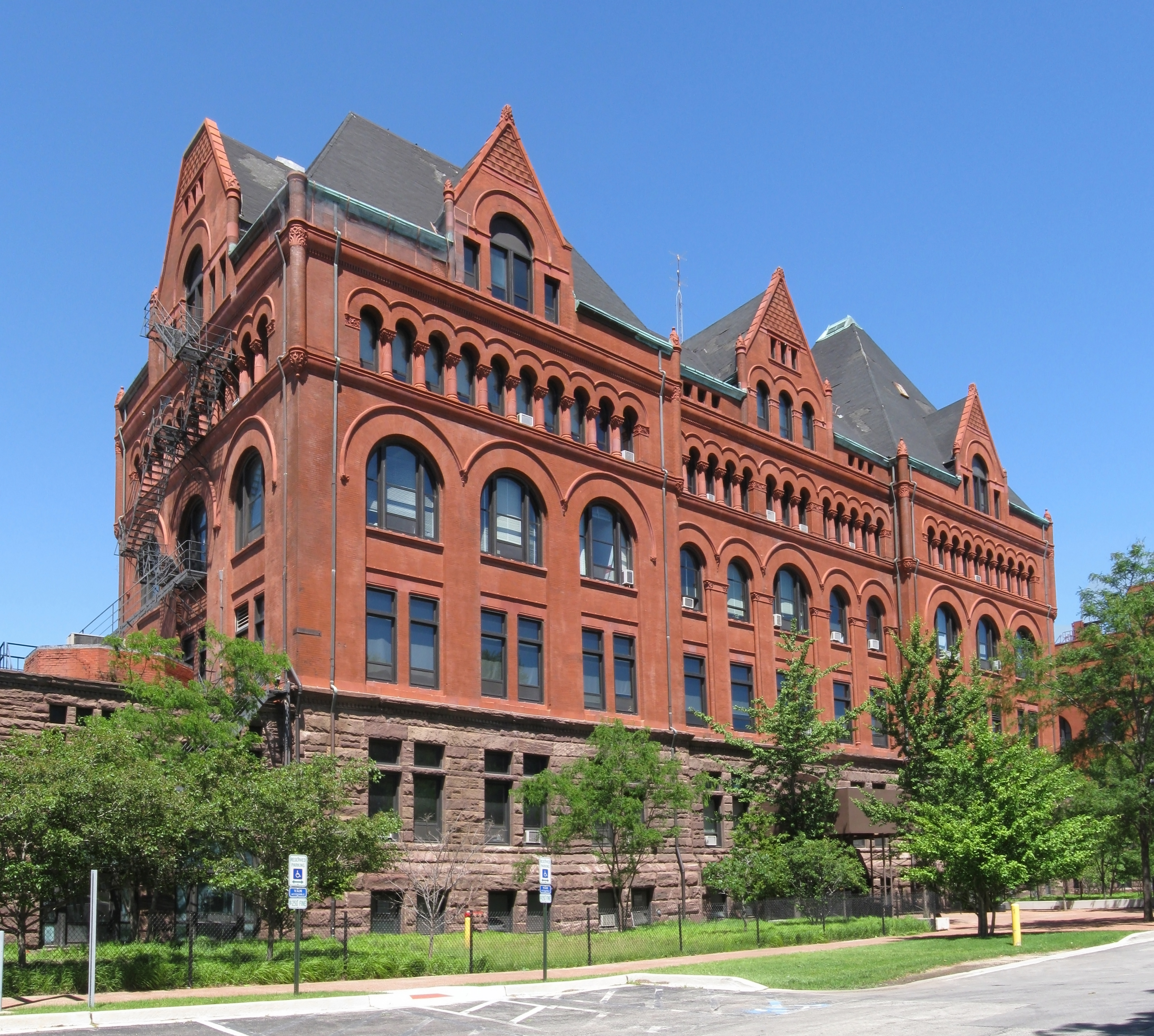
Main Building

The Main Building, Machinery Hall, and the Laboratory (now a garage called the Auto Lab) are the only remaining structures from the original Armour campus. The structures sit on the west side of the campus, adjacent to the Dan Ryan Expressway and the Chicago "L"'s Dan Ryan branch (carrying the Red Line), northeast of the location of the former Comiskey Park. They were all designed by Patton & Fisher (later Patton, Fisher & Miller) in the Romanesque style. The garage/laboratory has similar materials but a simpler design than the other two buildings. A writer for the Chicago Tribune said in 1991 that the style "represented the new might of Chicago industry and commerce" of the time.

The Main Building is a five-story structure at 3300 South Federal Street. The ground story is clad in rough, dark-red sandstone with rectangular windows, while the upper stories are made of red brick and have round-arched and rectangular windows. The structure is divided into three sections, each with hip roofs with gables. A similarly styled annex at the southern end of the building, measuring two stories high, was originally the heating plant. A tower on the roof was removed after a fire in the late 1940s, and the south end of the building tilts slightly as a result of the fire. The main stair has a stained-glass window by Edwin P. Sperry; it is dedicated to Philip D. Armour Jr., the son of the Armour Institute's founder. There are additional stained glass windows on the first and fifth stories. As built, the first story had a library, reception room, woodworking workshops, and offices. The second through fourth stories were used for various educational departments, and the fifth story had a gymnasium, dressing rooms, and a gallery. The interior retains many of its original decorations, such as bronze wainscoting and cast-iron railings.

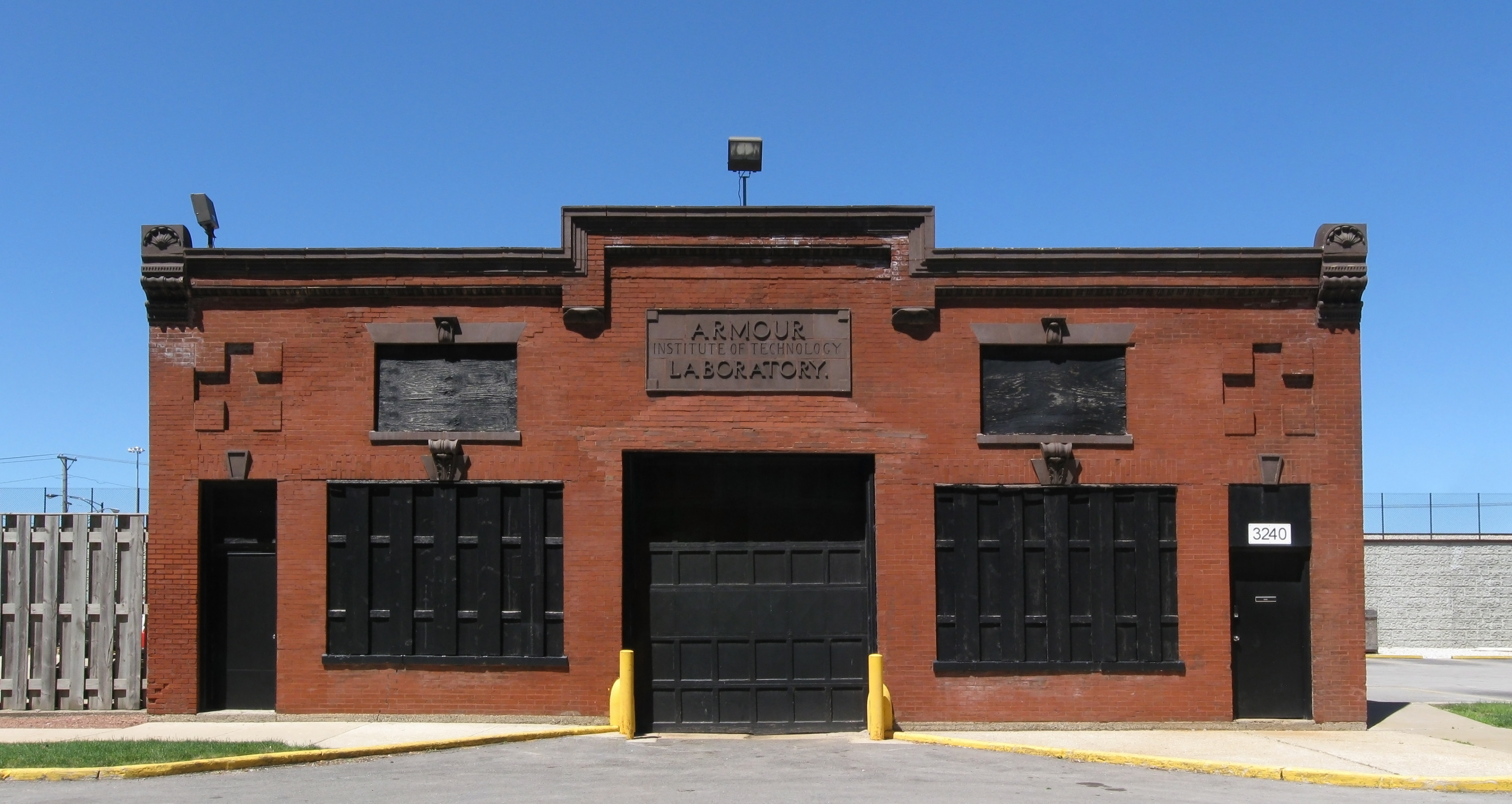
The garage/laboratory building

Machinery Hall, at 100 West 33rd Street (just north of the main building), is a four-story rectangular structure, designed with similar design details as the Main Building. The basement and first story are mostly clad with sandstone, while the northern elevation and the upper stories are covered in brick. The windows are rectangular and round-arched, with pilasters flanking the fourth floor windows. There is a parapet surrounding the roof and a brick penthouse behind it. The building has an ornamental iron staircase, and originally had a laboratory in the basement, as well as workshops and lecture halls on the upper floors. Further north is the garage/laboratory building at 3240 South Federal Street. The one-story garage has a plain red-brick facade, with a central garage opening flanked by doors and windows, as well as a terracotta plaque above the garage door and a parapet on the roof.

=== Mies buildings ===
The Mies campus has one of the largest concentrations of his buildings in the world. During his two decades as IIT's architecture director and campus architect, Mies designed around 20 buildings on the campus. Mies's IIT buildings tended to be up to four stories high, with corners made of I-beams. The buildings generally have a steel or reinforced concrete frame and a facade with buff brick and glass; these materials were inspired by the factories and warehouses of Chicago's South Side. In some of the buildings, the corners are serrated to visually distinguish the non-structural curtain wall from the structural frame.

In general, the structures' floor plans consist of modules measuring 24 by 24 feet (7.3 by 7.3 m) across and 12 feet (3.7 m) high. According to the writer Franz Schulze, the modular grid may have been an outgrowth of Mies's "belief in a rational order in architecture as a sign of higher truth", a notion he endorsed more strongly after moving to the United States. The grid also allowed IIT to save money by using modular elements of similar size, and they allowed the interiors to be more flexible. Conversely, the writer Charles Willard Moore said the gridlike design was not readily apparent even from ground level and that it excluded any permutations of designs that did not involve a rectangular module.

Mies and his partners created hundreds of architectural drawings during World War II, experimenting with exterior details and clear spans. There are slight variations in the buildings' architectural details. The columns in Mies's very first building, the IIT Research Institute's (IIRTI) Engineering Research Building, are concealed behind the facade rather than being exposed. Reinforced concrete is used in all of the IIRTI buildings for consistency with the Engineering Research Building, which could not use steel due to World War II material shortages. The oldest buildings had continuous brick facades, which tended to crack; buildings constructed after the war were divided vertically into bays to reduce cracking. Additionally, some structures' facades have purely-decorative steel beams to conceal their concrete frames.

==== North of 33rd Street ====
The Association of American Railroads (AAR) built three buildings next to the Rock Island railroad tracks, as well as a test track for trains. All three buildings are two stories high, with steel frames and brick walls; only the longer elevations of each building have windows, which on the first floor are placed high up. At 3140 South Federal Street is the AAR's Chicago Technical Center, later used by the VanderCook College of Music. It is a two-story rectangular building accessed through a raised porch, with stainless-steel entrance doors in a glass-and-steel entryway. Inside are various laboratories, offices, and a conference room. The AAR's two-story Mechanical Engineering Building, at 3100 South Federal Street, has a similar design to the Chicago Technical Center, with a door for railroad cars. Across Federal Street to the east is the AAR's Laboratory Building at 3120 South Dearborn Street. North of the Laboratory Building, Friedman, Alschuler and Sincere designed a one-story annex and standalone tower, both of which have brick facades, steel frames, and windows.

At 3201 South Dearborn Street is Alumni Memorial Hall, a rectangular building with a flat roof and a steel frame encased in fireproofing materials. The fireproofing is concealed behind non-structural steel decorations, which signify the frame. The facade itself consists of brick-and-glass panels, and the corners are serrated. Alumni Memorial Hall originally consisted of two stories, though a third story was inserted within the existing structure in 1972; it includes classrooms and an auditorium. Adjoining it is Perlstein Hall at 10 West 33rd Street, which abuts a courtyard. A two-story rectangular structure, it has similar exterior features to Alumni Memorial Hall, with classrooms, an auditorium, and an open-plan laboratory inside. At 3255 South Dearborn Street, west of Perlstein Hall and south of Alumni Memorial Hall, is Wishnick Hall. The three-story building's exterior is similar to those of Perlstein and Alumni Memorial halls, while inside are an auditorium and classrooms. All three buildings' main entrances are through stainless-steel doors inside glass-and-steel entryways. Each of Alumni Memorial Hall's windows consist of two smaller panes topped by a large pane, while Perlstein and Wishnick halls' windows consist of four panes of the same size.

==== 33rd to 34th Street ====
Siegel Hall, at 3301 South Dearborn Street, is the campus's physics and electrical engineering building. The building is three stories high and is nearly identical in design to Wishnick Hall, with a rectangular footprint, steel frame, flat roof, brick facade, steel window frames, and serrated corners. Inside Siegel Hall are multiple laboratories, classrooms, offices, and an auditorium. The Minerals & Metals Research Building, at 3350 South Federal Street, is also three stories high with a brick foundation, glazed facade, steel mullions, and some laboratories; the columns are concealed behind the facade. Abutting the Minerals & Metals building to the north is an annex designed by Mies, with a brick facade interspersed with horizontal strips of windows, as well as additional laboratories. Before the annex was constructed, the Minerals & Metal building's northern elevation had a partially exposed steel frame, corresponding to the floor levels inside.

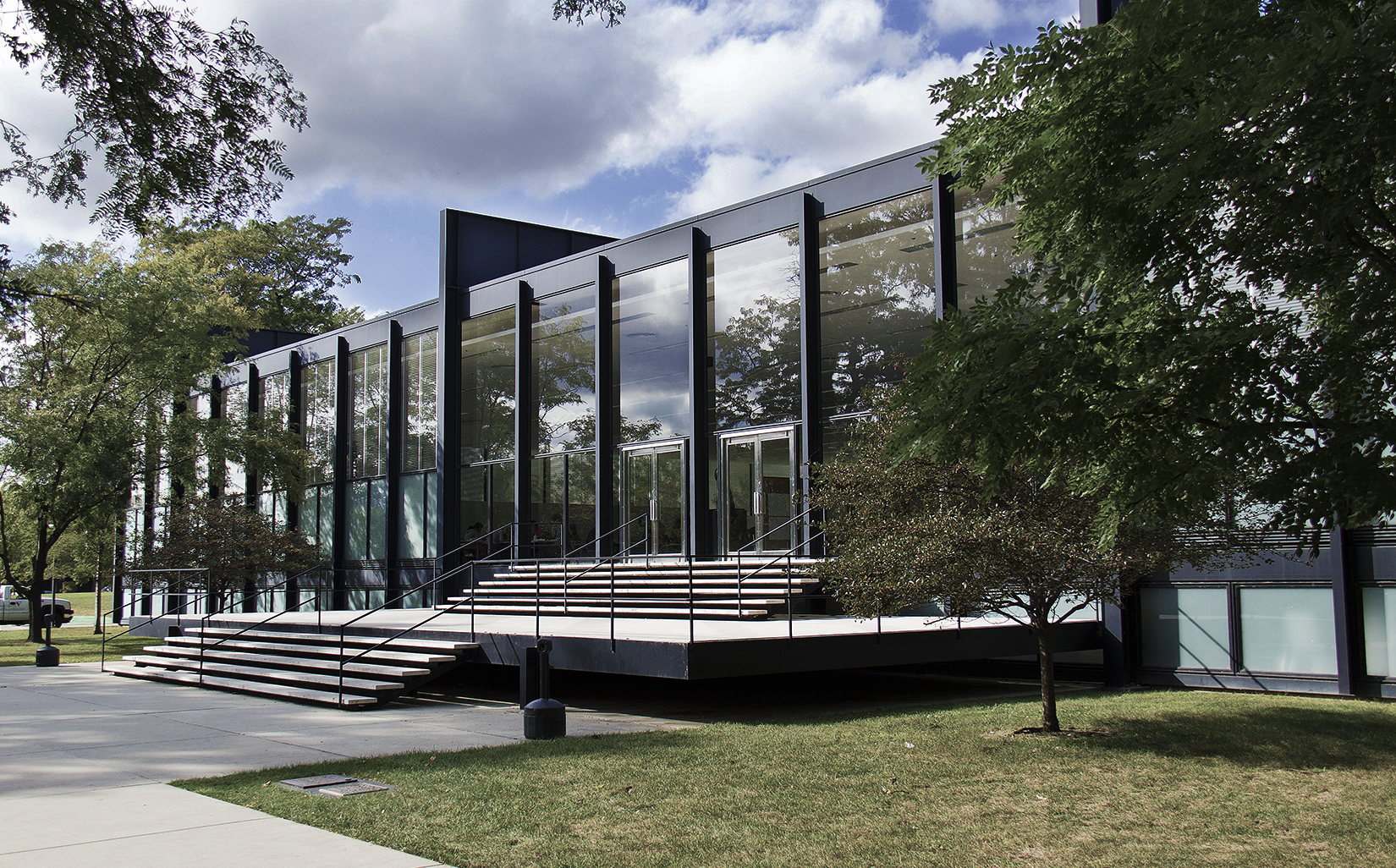
Entrance to Crown Hall

S. R. Crown Hall at 3360 South State Street, which housed IIT's school of architecture, was one of Mies's favorite designs; he described it as "the clearest structure we have done, the best to express our philosophy". Unlike Mies's other buildings, Crown Hall is built on a grid of squares measuring 10 feet (3.0 m) on each side. Crown Hall also differs from the other IIT buildings in that its superstructure consists entirely of exterior columns that hold up roof girders, allowing the interior to be a column-free open plan space. Yet another difference is in the facade, which includes both transparent and translucent panels of glass. Other decorative details include a travertine porch on the building's southern elevation and stairs on both the north and south elevations.

==== South of 34th Street ====
The Boiler & Steam Generating Plant is a rectangular structure at 3430 South Federal Street. It was built in two phases: The five northern bays date from 1950, while the six southern bays date from 1964 after Mies's death. It has a flat roof, steel frame, and glass-and-brick facade, but there are windows only at the top of the facade. Inside are gas-burning equipment (which replaced the original coal hopper) and a boiler.

The Engineering Research Building, at 3441 South Federal Street, is a two-story rectangular building with a reinforced concrete superstructure and a brick facade. The upper portions of the western and eastern elevations have windows with wood mullions. Immediately to the east, at 35 West 34th Street, is the Life Sciences Research Building. It is a two-story rectangular building with a concrete frame, brick and glass facade, and stainless-steel entrance doors within a glass-and-steel entryway. Mies designed the original section to the south in 1956, while the annex to the north was designed in 1961 by Schmidt, Garden & Erickson in an identical style. Both of these structures connect to the Chemistry Research Building to the south.

Two buildings of IIT's Institute of Gas Technology (now University Technology Park) on State Street are listed on the NRHP. The North Building, at 3410 South State Street, (Note: National Park Service 2005, pp. 12–13, erroneously cites the North and South buildings as having the same address, 3424 South State Street.) is a two-story rectangular building with a reinforced-concrete frame, brick facade panels, windows at the top of each story, and a flat roof. The North Building's first floor is slightly raised. The South Building, at 3440 South State Street, has similar decorative details to the North Building, except that it is four stories high. This building has soundproof rooms for acoustic testing.

=== Post-Mies buildings ===
==== Schmidt, Garden and Erikson structures ====
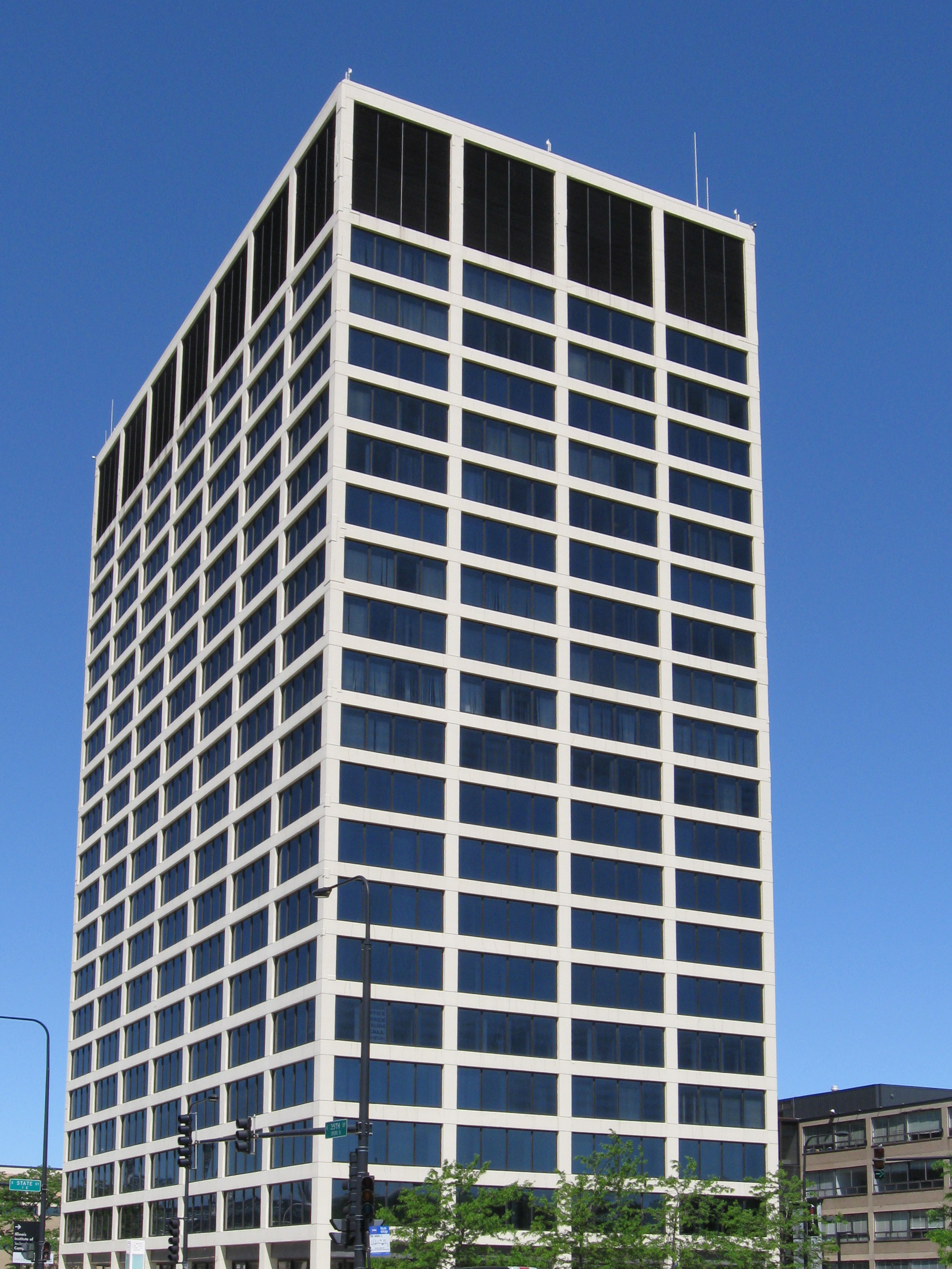
The IIRTI Tower, one of Schmidt, Garden and Erikson's buildings

In addition to an expansion of the Mechanical Engineering and Research Building, Schmidt, Garden and Erikson designed four buildings of their own, all of which are on the NRHP. The Chemistry Research Building (later Technology Business Center) at 3440 South Dearborn Street was completed in 1960. The main building is a three-story rectangular structure with a concrete frame, brick and glass facade, and stainless-steel entrance doors within a glass-and-steel entryway. Two wings to the north, set back from Federal Street to the west and Dearborn Street to the east, connect respectively to the Engineering Research and Life Sciences Research buildings.

Their other three buildings are part of the University Technology Park. The Central Building is at 3424 South State Street; it connects Mies's North and South buildings on either side. The Central Building is a four-story rectangular building with a slightly raised first story, a reinforced-concrete frame, brick facade panels, windows at the top of each story, and a flat roof. Next to the Central Building is a reinforced-concrete power plant with windows at ground level and a pair of smoke stacks above; the power plant adjoins a structure known as the "crossover", designed by the same firm. To the south of the North, Central, and South buildings (at 10 West 35th Street) is the campus's tallest building, the IIT Research Institute's (IIRTI) Galvin Tower, which is variously cited as being 19, 20, or 21 stories high. The IIRTI Tower is a rectangular, reinforced-concrete structure with a recessed facade at ground level and glazed windows in each bay; it is internally connected to several other buildings nearby.

==== SOM structures ====
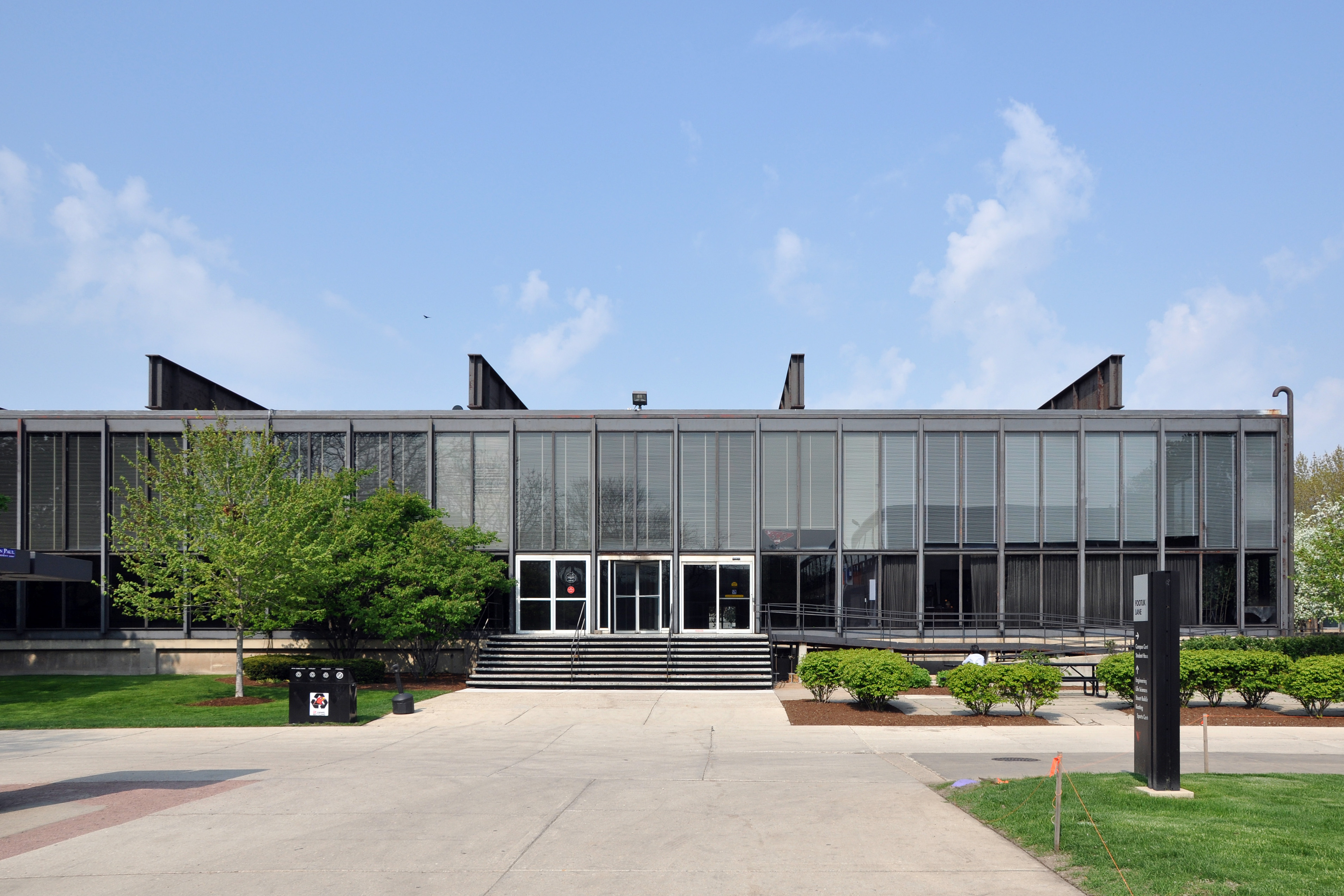
Hermann Hall, one of two buildings designed by Netsch

Walter Netsch of SOM designed two buildings on the campus, both on the NRHP. The first is Hermann Hall at 3241 South Federal Street, north of 33rd Street. Hermann Hall, a single-story rectangular building, uses design features modeled after those of Crown Hall, including a raised entrance, flat roof, and black metal frame; unlike Crown Hall, there are interior columns. Hermann Hall originally contained an auditorium, dining spaces, a bowling alley, and a ballroom, though these were converted to conference spaces after the McCormick Tribune Campus Center was built. The other is the Galvin Library at 35 West 33rd Street, south of 33rd Street. The structure, originally known as the James S. Kemper Library, can fit 400 people, with special collections on the lower level, and study rooms and stacks on the upper level. It is similar in design to Hermann Hall, including in its use of interior columns, except that the building is at-grade instead of slightly elevated. The library building has been named after Motorola founder Paul V. Galvin since 1985.

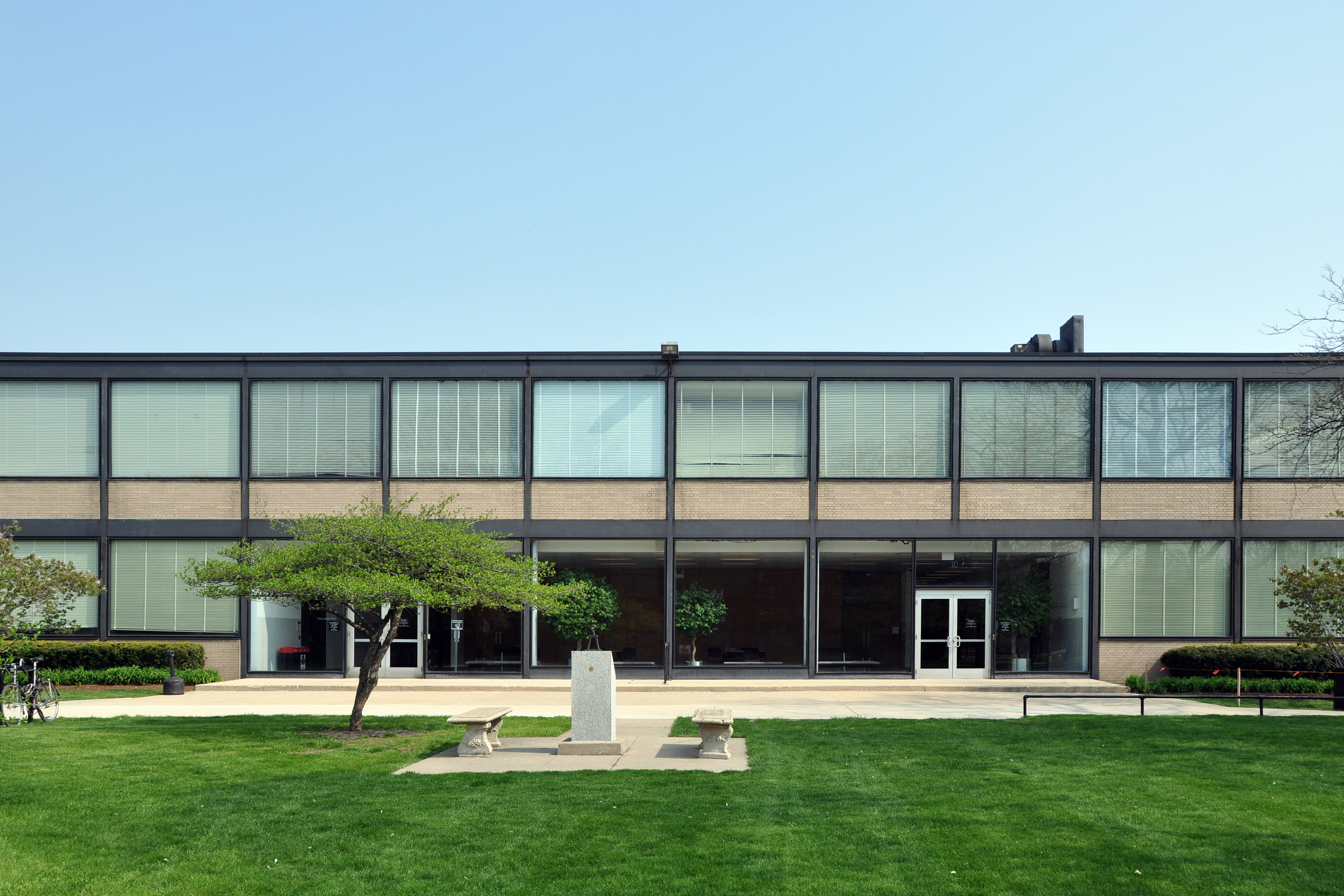
The Engineering I Building, one of four designed by Goldsmith

Myron Goldsmith, also of SOM, designed four buildings, of which three are part of the NRHP designation. These are the Life Sciences Building (now Pritzker Science Center) at 3105 South Dearborn Avenue, the Engineering I Building (now Rettaliata Engineering Center) at 10 West 32nd Street, and Stuart Hall at 10 West 31st Street. All three buildings are rectangular; the Life Sciences Building is three stories tall, while the others are two stories. Since Goldsmith had studied under Mies, his buildings bear greater similarities to Mies's designs than the other architects' buildings do. The buildings' features include black steel frames, steel-plate corners, brick-and-glass facade panels, a flat roof, and stainless-steel entrance doors within a glass-and-steel entryway. Unlike the Mies designs, none of the Goldsmith buildings have mullions. The Life Sciences Building has a multi-use auditorium and classrooms, as does the Engineering I Building.

== Other structures ==
=== Dormitories ===
The campus also includes other structures that are not part of the NRHP designation. The first four residential halls (Carman, Gunsaulus, Cunningham, and Kacek halls), on 31st Street between Michigan and Wabash avenues, were built in the 1950s and are at the northeast corner of the campus. Three of these were designed by Mies, while Gunsaulus Hall was designed by SOM. Each of these structures contain between 56 and 116 units; the four buildings have a combined 356 apartments, each with between two and six rooms. These original dormitories shared features with Mies's academic buildings, including steel frames and buff brick-and-glass facades. The Mies buildings also have concrete frames, similarly to his Promontory Apartments design, in addition to recessed lobbies with glazed facades. Over the years, the buildings have been rearranged, with different layouts in each residence hall.

On Michigan Avenue near 33rd Street is the McCormick Student Village, which consists of Farr, Fowler, North, South, East, Graduate, and Lewis halls. Most of these were designed by Mittelbusher & Tourtelot in the 1960s, except for Farr and Fowler Halls, which date from 1948 and were designed by SOM. The dormitories are four stories high and are connected to the McCormick Lounge and dining hall. They generally have buff-brick facades and flat roofs.

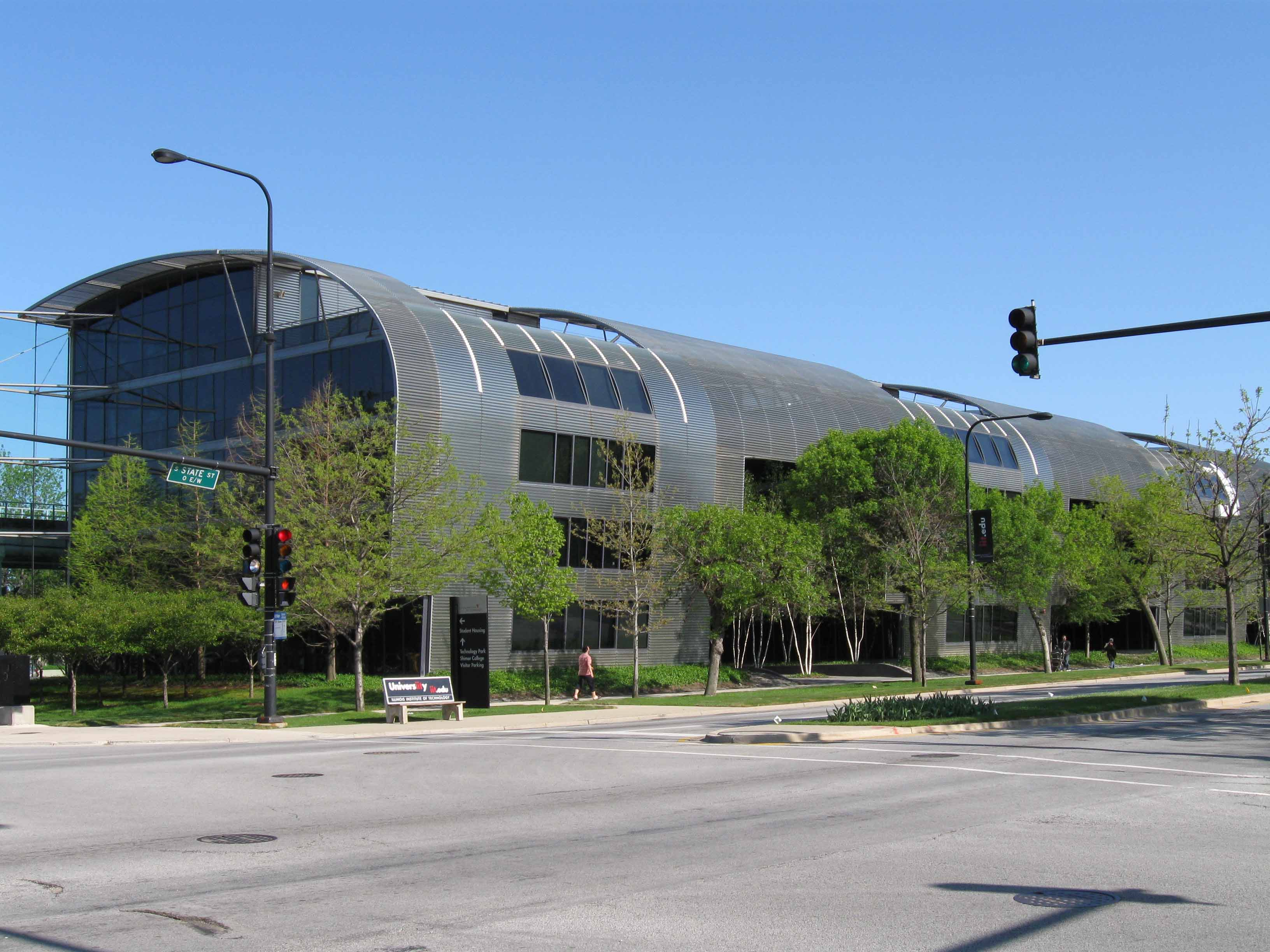
State Street Village

The State Street Village complex, designed by Helmut Jahn, consists of three five-story dormitories abutting the State Street Elevated. The buildings have reinforced-concrete frames with stainless-steel and tinted-glass facades. The roofs and facades of the buildings are all connected, with openings to let in sunlight; the eastern elevations of each building have polycarbonate and insulated-glass barriers to reduce noise from passing trains. Each building includes a courtyard, which provides access to two wings (one on either side). Inside are 98 rooms that can fit a combined 367 students. The interiors have concrete surfaces, stainless-steel restroom hardware, and minimalist furniture. Each dormitory has a roof terrace, and there are also communal study areas on the eastern side of each building.

=== Other buildings ===
Mies designed the Commons, a one-story rectangular structure with a steel frame and a brick-and-glass facade, located southwest of the former intersection of Wabash Avenue and 32nd Street. The Commons originally had various stores and recreational facilities, but it has been used as a dining hall since the McCormick Tribune Campus Center opened in 2003. The Commons' interior superstructure is completely visible, with 16-foot-tall (4.9 m) concrete ceilings supported on steel columns. The Commons' western and southern facades link to the campus center, with a courtyard separating them on one side. The campus center is also one story high and has a glassy facade, with a double-laminated, orange-tinted western elevation facing State Street. It includes several diagonal passageways, which follow the old desire paths that students had taken through the site before the building's construction; these are flanked by facilities such as meeting rooms, student offices, stores, and recreational spaces. The South Side Elevated tracks pass through the building in a concrete-and-steel tube measuring about 530 feet (160 m) long. Together, the Commons and campus center occupy a rectangular plot.

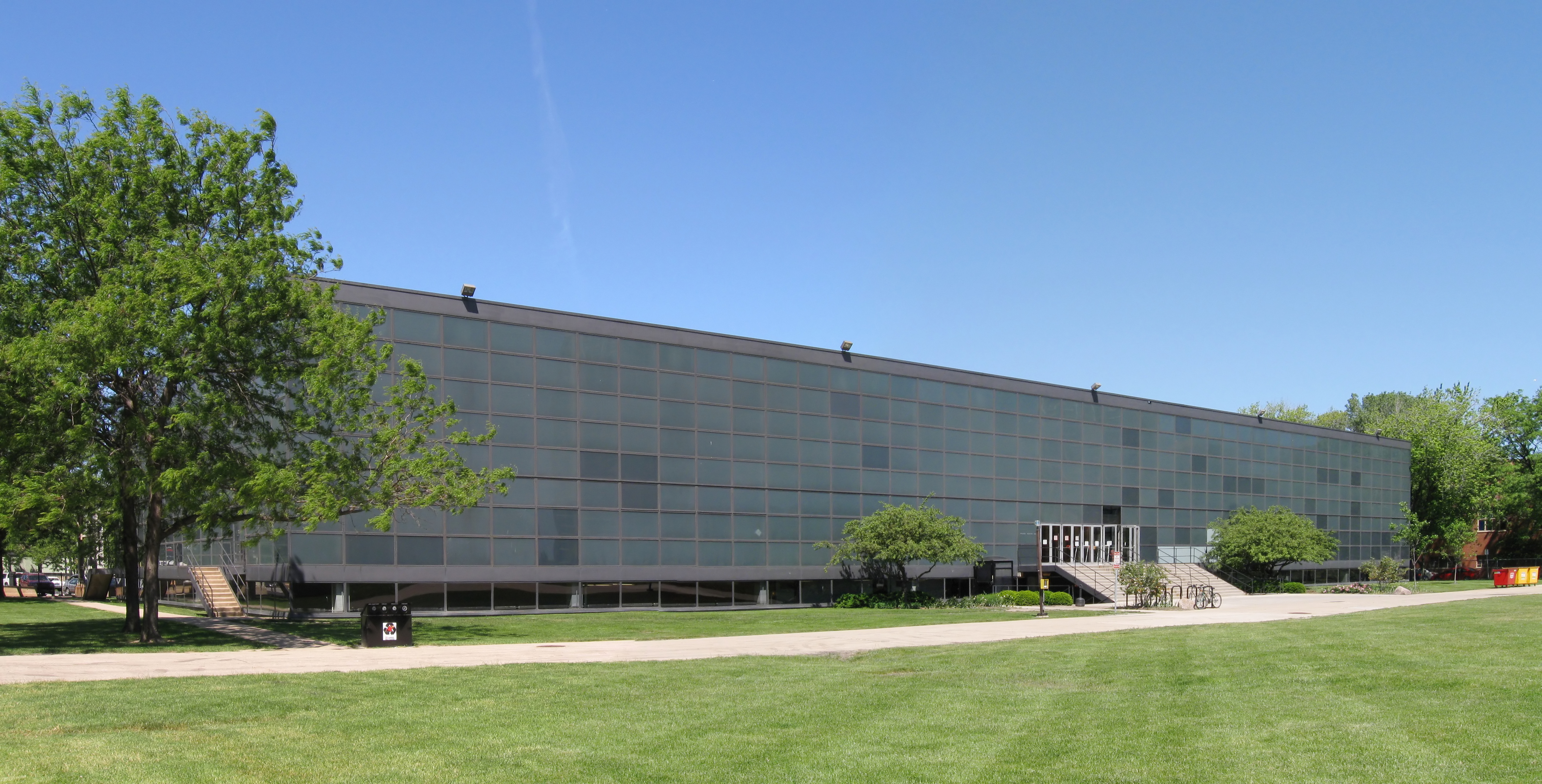
Keating Hall

At the north end of campus is Keating Hall, the athletic building, which is located at 3040 South Wabash Avenue and was designed by Goldsmith. The building spans three stories, two of which are underground; because of its function, Keating Hall has a different design from IIT's other buildings, with a glass facade and a roof resting on large plate girders. Inside are a gymnasium, swimming pool, team sports facilities, classrooms, offices, and fitness rooms.

The eastern portion of the campus has nine fraternity and sorority halls, which are owned by IIT and leased to various fraternal organizations. Five of these buildings are almost identical, with three stories each. These structures have a lobby, a resident adviser's apartment, and communal rooms on the first floor, as well as study rooms and bedrooms on the upper stories. The fraternity and sorority buildings were designed by multiple architects between 1958 and 1960, surrounding a campus quad. Also on the east side of campus, next to Carman Hall, is the Carr Memorial Chapel, a rectangular structure measuring one story high. It has a concrete-and-steel frame, a brick-and-glass facade, and a travertine altar; the interior superstructure, including the roof's superstructure, is completely visible inside.

At the campus's western end, there is a cogeneration plant designed by National Energy Systems next to the boiler building; it has a capacity of 8,000 kilowatts (11,000 hp). The western portion of the campus also includes the Ed Kaplan Family Institute for Innovation and Tech Entrepreneurship, designed by John Ronan Architects. The Kaplan Institute building has a 24-by-24-foot (7.3 by 7.3 m) square floor grid and a rectangular massing, similar to many of Mies's earlier buildings. The upper portion of the Kaplan Institute building has an ethylene tetrafluoroethylene facade, making it the first building in Chicago to use that material. The second story is cantilevered, protruding above the ground floor. The Kaplan Institute building contains open-plan study areas and two outdoor courtyards.

=== Demolished and unbuilt structures ===
Although Mies had proposed replacing the original Armour Institute buildings as part of his IIT master plan, this never happened. The Armour Institute structures originally complemented two now-demolished buildings, designed in a similar style. In front of the Main Building is a stone salvaged from the Armour Mission building (1886–1962), designed by Burnham & Root. The other was Patton & Fisher's Armour Flats (1886–1967), a set of three- and four-story apartment buildings with sandstone and brick facades and a combined 194 units.

Mies's original plan called for two modernist structures around 33rd Street. The Lewis Building site, occupied by Siegel Hall, would have housed the Lewis Institute, but this was canceled after IIT decided to prioritize other projects. The plot south of Perlstein Hall would have become the Mechanical Engineering Building, which was canceled due to a lack of funds. As such, the southwestern corner of State and 33rd streets remained vacant in the 21st century. Mies also prepared plans for an unbuilt library and administration building, which would have used 64-foot-wide (20 m) modules, with a large interior court and cantilevered mezzanine. When the Galvin Library was eventually built, it was not constructed to Mies's plans.

== List of buildings ==
Building name (Note: Buildings in brackets are part of a larger complex.)	Location	Building type	Date completed, expanded	Architects	Notes (Note: Buildings marked as "NRHP" are part of the National Register of Historic Places district, and buildings marked as "CL" are additionally designated as Chicago Landmarks.)
Main Building	3300 South Federal Street 41.8343°N 87.6293°W	Student services	1891, 1900	Patton & Fisher	NRHP, CL
Auto Lab / Garage / Laboratory	3240 South Federal Street 41.8352°N 87.6293°W	Student services	1901 or 1917 (Note: The National Park Service and Franz Schulze both give a date of 1901, while IIT's website gives a much later date of 1917, citing internal bulletins.)	Patton & Fisher	NRHP
Machinery Hall	100 West 33rd Street 41.8348°N 87.6293°W	Facilities services	1901	Patton & Fisher	NRHP, CL
Materials & Metals Building / Minerals & Materials Building / IIT Storage	3350 South Federal Street 41.8333°N 87.6293°W	Rental property	1943, 1958	Ludwig Mies van der Rohe	NRHP
Alumni Memorial Hall / Navy Building	3201 South Dearborn Street 41.8362°N 87.6273°W	Academic building	1946	Ludwig Mies van der Rohe	NRHP
Engineering Research Building	3441 South Federal Street 41.8317°N 87.6287°W	University Technology Park at Illinois Tech	1946	Ludwig Mies van der Rohe	NRHP
Perlstein Hall / Metallurgy & Chemical Engineering Building	10 West 33rd Street 41.8355°N 87.6271°W	Academic building	1946	Ludwig Mies van der Rohe	NRHP
Wishnick Hall / Chemistry Building	3255 South Dearborn Street 41.8350°N 87.6276°W	Academic building	1946	Ludwig Mies van der Rohe	NRHP
Farr Hall	3300 South Michigan Avenue 41.8343°N 87.6237°W	Student services	1948	Skidmore, Owings & Merrill	
Fowler Hall [McCormick Student Village]	3241 South Wabash Avenue 41.8360°N 87.6238°W	Student services	1948	Skidmore, Owings & Merrill	
Gunsaulus Hall	3140 South Michigan Avenue 41.8371°N 87.6240°W	Residence hall	1950	Skidmore, Owings & Merrill	
Heating Plant / Boiler Plant & Steam Generating Plant	3430 South Federal Street 41.8320°N 87.6293°W	Facilities services	1950, 1964	Ludwig Mies van der Rohe (original), Sargent & Lundy (expansion)	NRHP
North Building, Institute of Gas Technology	3410 South State Street 41.8325°N 87.6272°W	University Technology Park at Illinois Tech	1950	Ludwig Mies van der Rohe	NRHP
VanderCook College of Music / Chicago Technical Center–Administration [AAR Complex]	3140 South Federal Street 41.8367°N 87.6292°W	Rental property	1950	Ludwig Mies van der Rohe	NRHP
Carr Chapel	65 East 32nd Street 41.8366°N 87.6241°W	Student services	1952	Ludwig Mies van der Rohe	
IITRI Life Sciences Research Building / Mechanical Engineering Research Building	35 West 34th Street 41.8317°N 87.6283°W	University Technology Park at Illinois Tech	1952, 1961	Ludwig Mies van der Rohe (original), Schmidt, Garden & Erikson (expansion)	NRHP
Carman Hall	60 East 32nd Street 41.8367°N 87.6246°W	Residence hall	1953	Ludwig Mies van der Rohe	
Facilities Building / Mechanical Engineering Building [AAR Complex]	3100 South Federal Street 41.8379°N 87.6292°W	Other	1953	Ludwig Mies van der Rohe	NRHP
Commons Building	3200 South Wabash Avenue 41.8361°N 87.6255°W	Student services	1954	Ludwig Mies van der Rohe	
Cunningham Hall	3100 South Michigan Avenue 41.8377°N 87.6240°W	Residence hall	1955	Ludwig Mies van der Rohe	
Kacek Hall (Bailey Hall)	3101 South Wabash Avenue 41.8379°N 87.6246°W	Residence hall	1955	Ludwig Mies van der Rohe	
South Building, Institute of Gas Technology / Physics and Electrical Engineering Research Building	3440 South State Street41.8317°N 87.6272°W	University Technology Park at Illinois Tech	1955 or 1956	Ludwig Mies van der Rohe	NRHP
S.R. Crown Hall	3360 South State Street 41.8332°N 87.6272°W	Academic building	1956	Ludwig Mies van der Rohe	NRHP, CL
Laboratory Building / VanderCook College of Music Building [AAR Complex]	3120 South Dearborn Street 41.8377°N 87.6283°W	Other	1956, 1960	Ludwig Mies van der Rohe	NRHP
Siegel Hall / Lewis Building	3301 South Dearborn Street 41.8342°N 87.6276°W	Academic building	1957	Ludwig Mies van der Rohe	NRHP
Phi Kappa Sigma	3366 South Michigan Avenue 41.8330°N 87.6242°W	Fraternity or sorority	1958	Karl M. Schmidt	
North Hall [McCormick Student Village]	71 East 32nd Street 41.8360°N 87.6246°W	Residence hall	1959	Mittelbusher & Tourtelot	
South Hall [McCormick Student Village]	71 East 32nd Street 41.8357°N 87.6246°W	Residence hall	1959	Mittelbusher & Tourtelot	
Triangle	3360 South Michigan Avenue 41.8330°N 87.6237°W	Fraternity or sorority	1959	Ekroth, Martorano & Ekroth	
Alpha Sigma Alpha	3340 South Michigan Avenue 41.8336°N 87.6237°W	Fraternity or sorority	1960	Mittelbusher & Tourtelot	
Alpha Sigma Phi	3361 South Wabash Avenue 41.8330°N 87.6246°W	Fraternity or sorority	1960	Harry Weese	
Delta Tau Delta	3349 South Wabash Avenue 41.8333°N 87.6246°W	Fraternity or sorority	1960	Alfred L. Mell	
Kappa Phi Delta	3330 South Michigan Avenue 41.8339°N 87.6237°W	Fraternity or sorority	1960	Mittelbusher & Tourtelot	
Pi Kappa Phi	3333 South Wabash Avenue 41.8339°N 87.6246°W	Fraternity or sorority	1960	Mittelbusher & Tourtelot	
Sigma Phi Epsilon	3341 South Wabash Avenue 41.8336°N 87.6246°W	Fraternity or sorority	1960	Mittelbusher & Tourtelot	
Technology Business Center and Incubator / Chemistry Research Building	3440 South Dearborn Street 41.8314°N 87.6284°W	University Technology Park at Illinois Tech	1960	Schmidt, Garden & Erikson	NRHP
Galvin Library	3241 South Federal Street 41.8337°N 87.6283°W	Student services	1962	Walter Netsch	NRHP
Hermann Hall	35 West 33rd Street 41.8357°N 87.6283°W	Student services	1962	Walter Netsch	NRHP
East Hall [McCormick Student Village]	71 East 32nd Street 41.8357°N 87.6238°W	Residence hall	1963	Mittelbusher & Tourtelot	
Michael Paul Galvin Tower / IIT Tower	10 West 35th Street 41.8314°N 87.6272°W	University Technology Park at Illinois Tech	1964	Schmidt, Garden & Erikson	NRHP
Power Plant	3424 South State Street 41.8317°N 87.6278°W	University Technology Park at Illinois Tech	1964	Schmidt, Garden & Erikson	NRHP
Central Building	3424 South State Street 41.8321°N 87.6272°W	University Technology Park at Illinois Tech	1965 or 1966	Schmidt, Garden & Erikson	NRHP
Graduate Hall [McCormick Student Village]	70 East 33rd Street 41.8352°N 87.6238°W	Residence hall	1966	Mittelbusher & Tourtelot	
Lewis Hall [McCormick Student Village]	70 East 33rd Street 41.8349°N 87.6238°W	Residence hall	1966	Mittelbusher & Tourtelot	
Keating Hall	3040 South Wabash Avenue 41.8389°N 87.6256°W	Athletics building	1966	Myron Goldsmith	
Robert A. Pritzker Science Center / Life Sciences Building	3105 South Dearborn Street 41.8379°N 87.6274°W	Academic building	1966	Myron Goldsmith	NRHP
John T. Rettaliata Engineering Center / Engineering I Building	10 West 32nd Street 41.8371°N 87.6272°W	Academic building	1968	Myron Goldsmith	NRHP
Stuart Hall	10 West 31st Street 41.8387°N 87.6274°W	Academic building	1971	Myron Goldsmith	NRHP
Cogeneration Plant	3400 South Federal Street 41.8326°N 87.6293°W	Facilities services	1991	National Energy Systems	
McCormick Tribune Campus Center	3201 South State Street 41.8356°N 87.6259°W	Student services	2003	Rem Koolhaas	
Jeanne and John Rowe Village / State Street Village	3301 South State Street 41.8337°N 87.6262°W	Residence hall	2003	Helmut Jahn	
Ed Kaplan Family Institute for Innovation and Tech Entrepreneurship	3137 South Federal Street 41.8368°N 87.6283°W	Academic building	2018	John Ronan	

== Impact ==
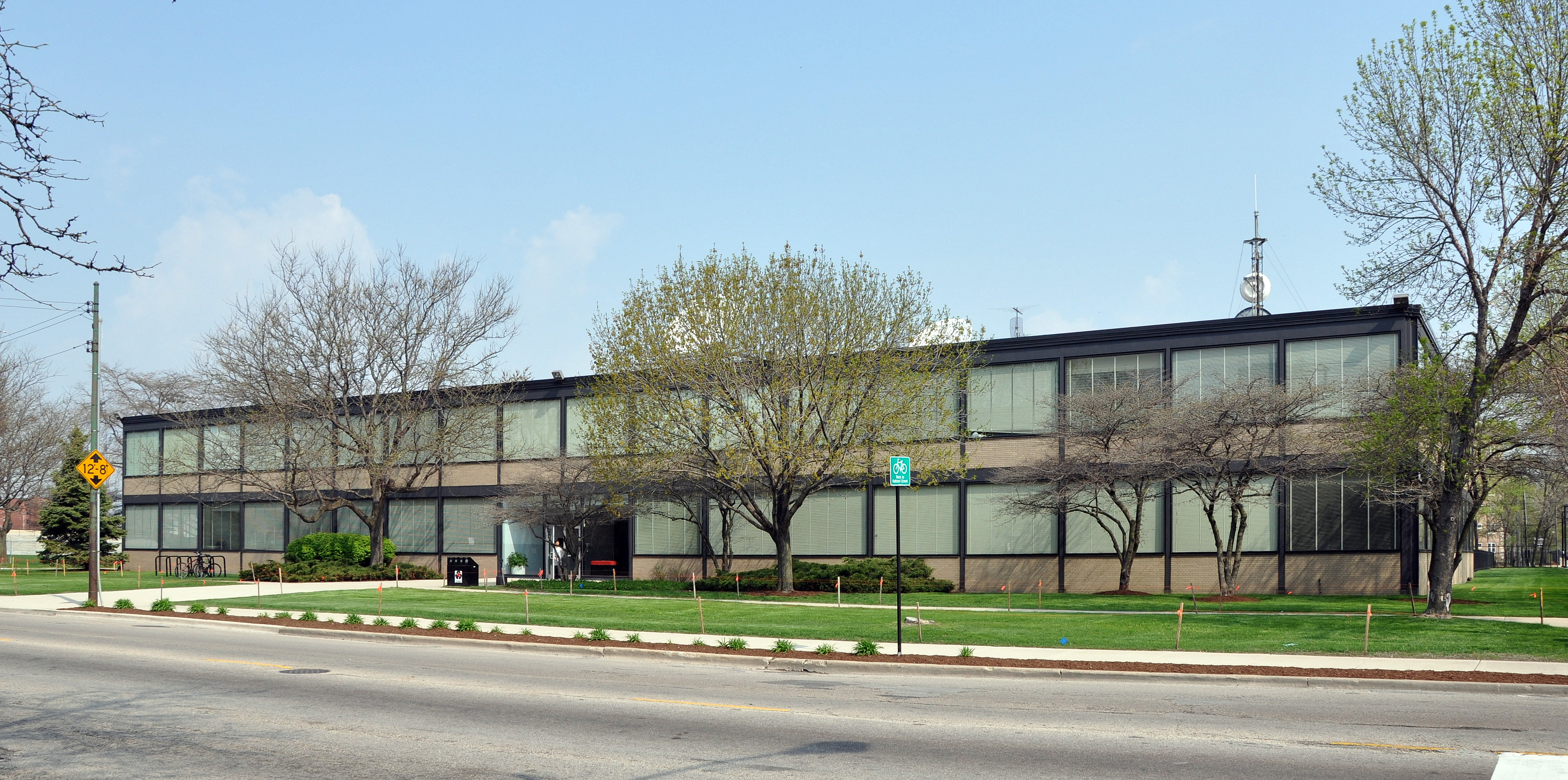
Stuart Hall, one of the later buildings on campus, was influenced by Mies's architecture.

The Mies buildings' designs were stark and unornamented, in contrast to the elaborate structures of earlier campuses. The design and layout of the IIT campus (particularly Mies's buildings) influenced those of other modernist college campuses across the United States, such as the University of St. Thomas, Air Force Academy, and University of Illinois Chicago. Previous colleges had had more traditional designs or were laid out around a quadrangle. Even Frank Lloyd Wright's Florida Southern College campus—"Child of the Sun", designed around the same time that Mies was hired—had differed greatly from the IIT campus. The architect Eero Saarinen cited the IIT Academic Campus's layout as having influenced his own design for the General Motors Technical Center in Warren, Michigan.

In 1976, the American Institute of Architects named the IIT campus one of the 200 most significant works of architecture in the United States. It was less well-regarded among American college students, who, in the late 1990s, ranked it as the country's "least beautiful campus". Reflecting the disparity in opinions between architects and students, a 2002 guidebook by The Princeton Review wrote that the campus was ranked in Travel + Leisure magazine as a top travel destination for architecture fans, but that it was still unattractive.

The IIT campus was added to the National Register of Historic Places in 2005. Several buildings also have local landmark designation. Crown Hall was named a Chicago Landmark in 1997, and it was individually added to the NRHP as a National Historic Landmark in 2001 because of its architectural significance. The Main Building and Machinery Hall were also designated as Chicago Landmarks in 2004. Also on the campus is the Armour Research Foundation Reactor, an experimental reactor that was designated as a Nuclear Historic Landmark in 2025.

== See also ==
- List of Chicago Landmarks
- National Register of Historic Places listings in South Side Chicago
