= Carr Memorial Chapel =

Chapel by Ludwig Mies van der Rohe

Coordinates: 41°50′11″N 87°37′28″W

Robert F. Carr Memorial Chapel of St. Savior
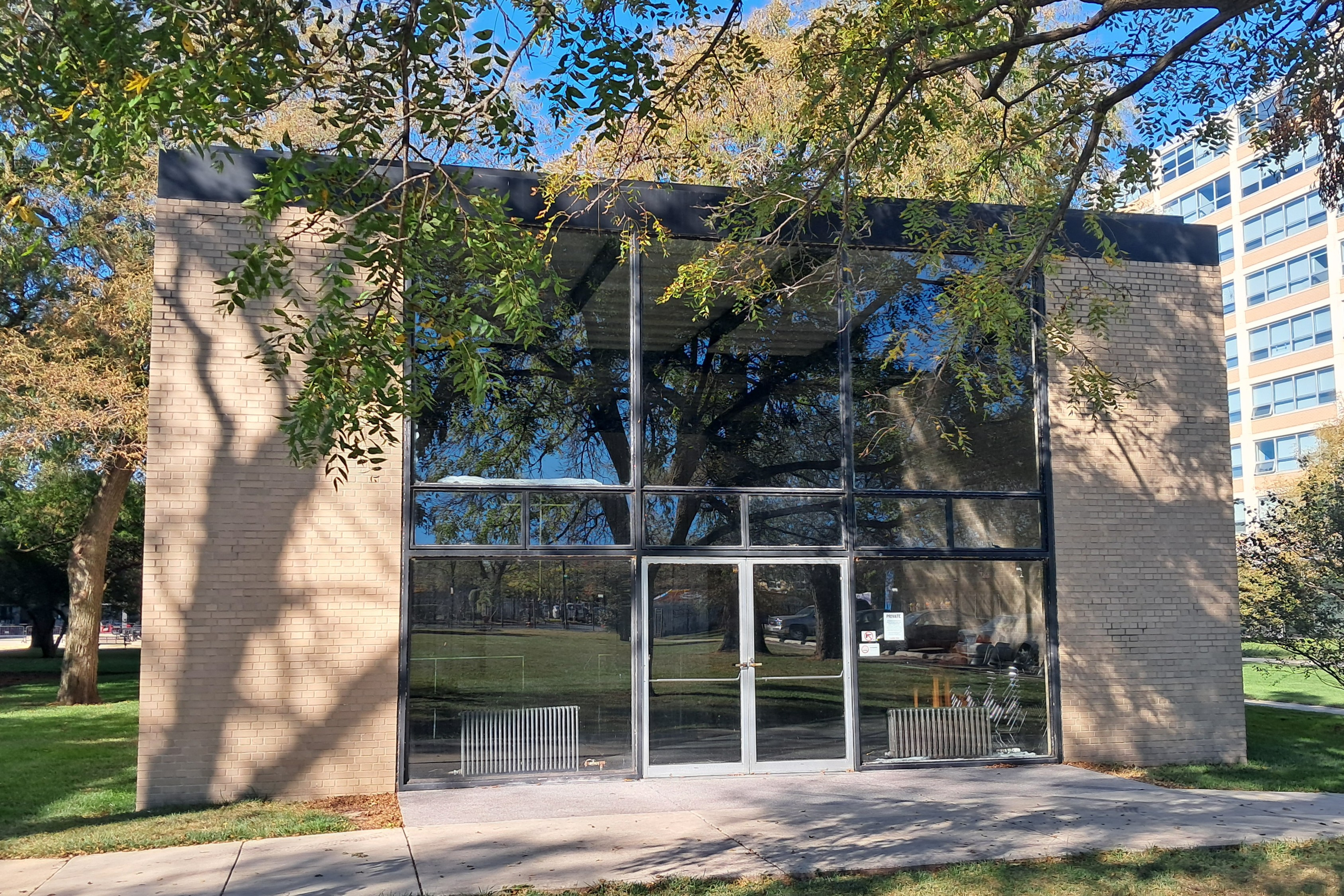
- Front view of Carr Memorial Chapel
- Robert F. Carr Memorial Chapel of St. Savior
- Location: 65 E. 32nd Street, Chicago, Illinois, United States

Architecture
- Architect: Ludwig Mies van der Rohe
- Architectural type: Minimalism, Modernism
- Years built: 1949–1952

Robert F. Carr Memorial Chapel of St. Savior, colloquially known as the "God Box", is a one-story brick building near the intersection of Michigan Avenue and 32nd Street on the Illinois Institute of Technology's (IIT) campus in Chicago, Illinois, United States. It is the only religious structure designed by German-American modern architect Ludwig Mies van der Rohe, who at the time was the director of the School of Architecture.

Bishop Wallace Conkling of the Episcopal Diocese of Chicago proposed the construction of the chapel in the late 1940s with the notion that it would be a "great educational project of the atomic age." IIT's religious and spiritual organizations currently use the "God Box" as a "center of campus spiritual life" for meditation, weekly services, and other meetings.

== History ==
=== Proposal ===
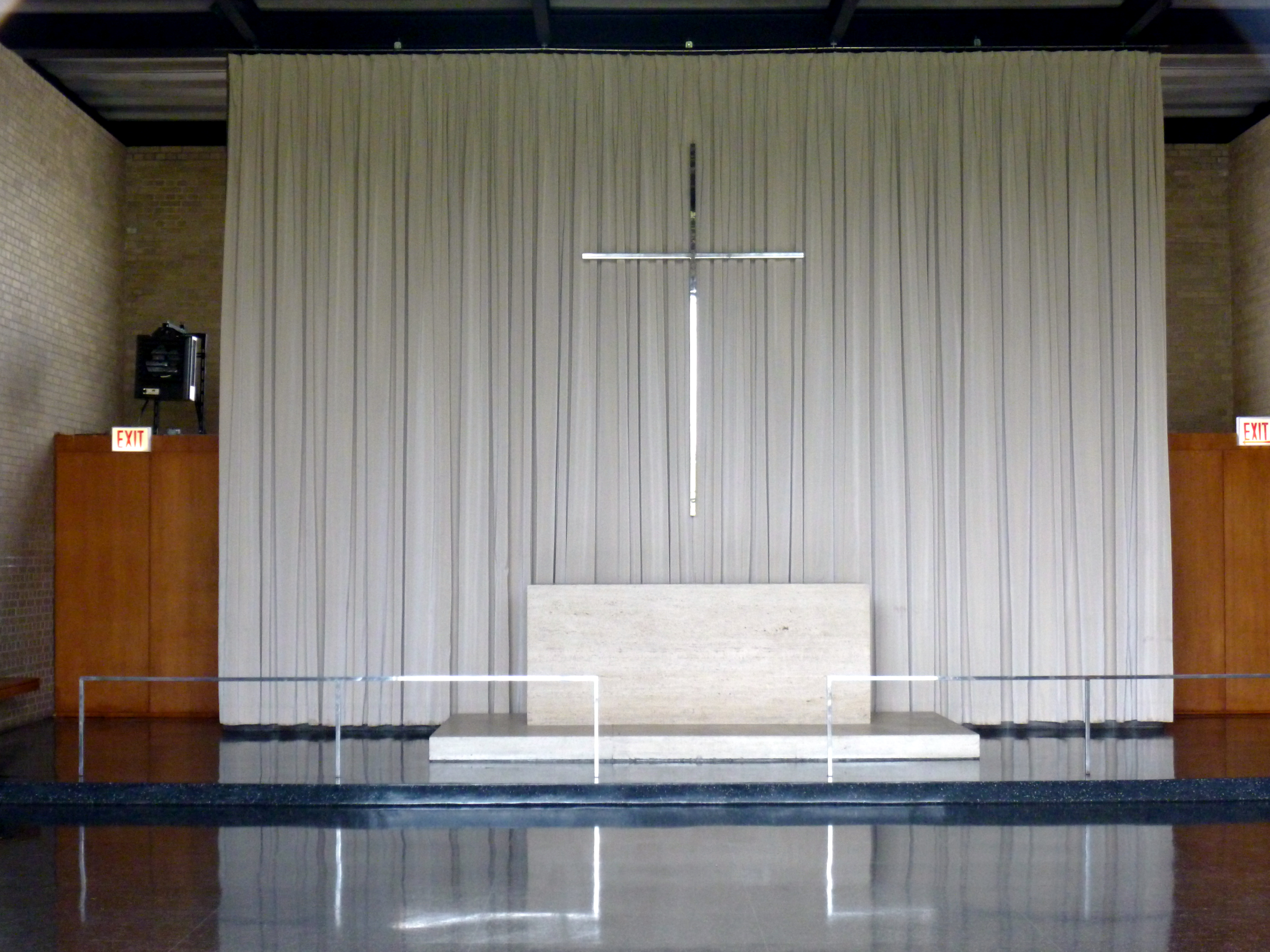
Chapel Interior: Steel Cross and Altar

Bishop Conkling presented his proposal to fund and build a chapel complex with a meeting hall and parish house at IIT to bridge the gap between education and religion after World War II. He believed the location of the chapel would spur students to "search for virtue while becoming proficient in the search for things."

=== Design and construction ===
IIT's administrators selected influential modernist architect Mies van der Rohe to design the chapel. Before the chapel, Mies had already designed other IIT buildings, whose designs often had to be modified to accommodate university budget cuts. The original proposal in 1949 consisted of two buildings: a chapel and a parish house. Mies' initial designs consisted of a 3,000 sq ft (280 m^{2}) chapel and a 2,300 sq ft (210 m^{2}) parish house. Interestingly, his perspective sketch has a "steel superstructure bracketed with opaque sidewalls." After university administrators decreased funding, the design excluded the parish house, although the steel frame was still in the plan. Once well into the construction phase, administrators still felt that the design would result in exorbitant costs. Mies reduced the chapel to a 2,220 sq ft (206 m^{2}) building with load-bearing bricks, instead of steel, that held steel beams to support a concrete roof. Recovered designs also reveal missing aspects such as companion pieces to the crucifix and white-oak pews. Despite the financial setbacks, Mies completed the chapel in 1952 without elaborate, ornate religious decorations.

=== Intended purpose and current use ===
Bishop Conkling allegedly wanted to increase the presence of the Episcopal Church on campus by creating a place where students could engage deeper in faith. Despite Conkling's apparent intention and church sponsorship, the final design did not include a parish house for the chaplain. Instead, Mies designed a modest yellow-brick prism whose only decorative features are the white, silk curtain behind the steel cross and the unadorned Roman travertine altar below it. Mies' simple plan for the small chapel was apparently intended to be conducive to inward contemplation. Interestingly, the university's desire to make a nondenominational structure may have caused the funding cuts. In fact, the administration later ensured that the building was open to students of all faiths. People currently use the chapel for both secular and nonsecular events such as Sunday services and weddings.

== Architecture ==
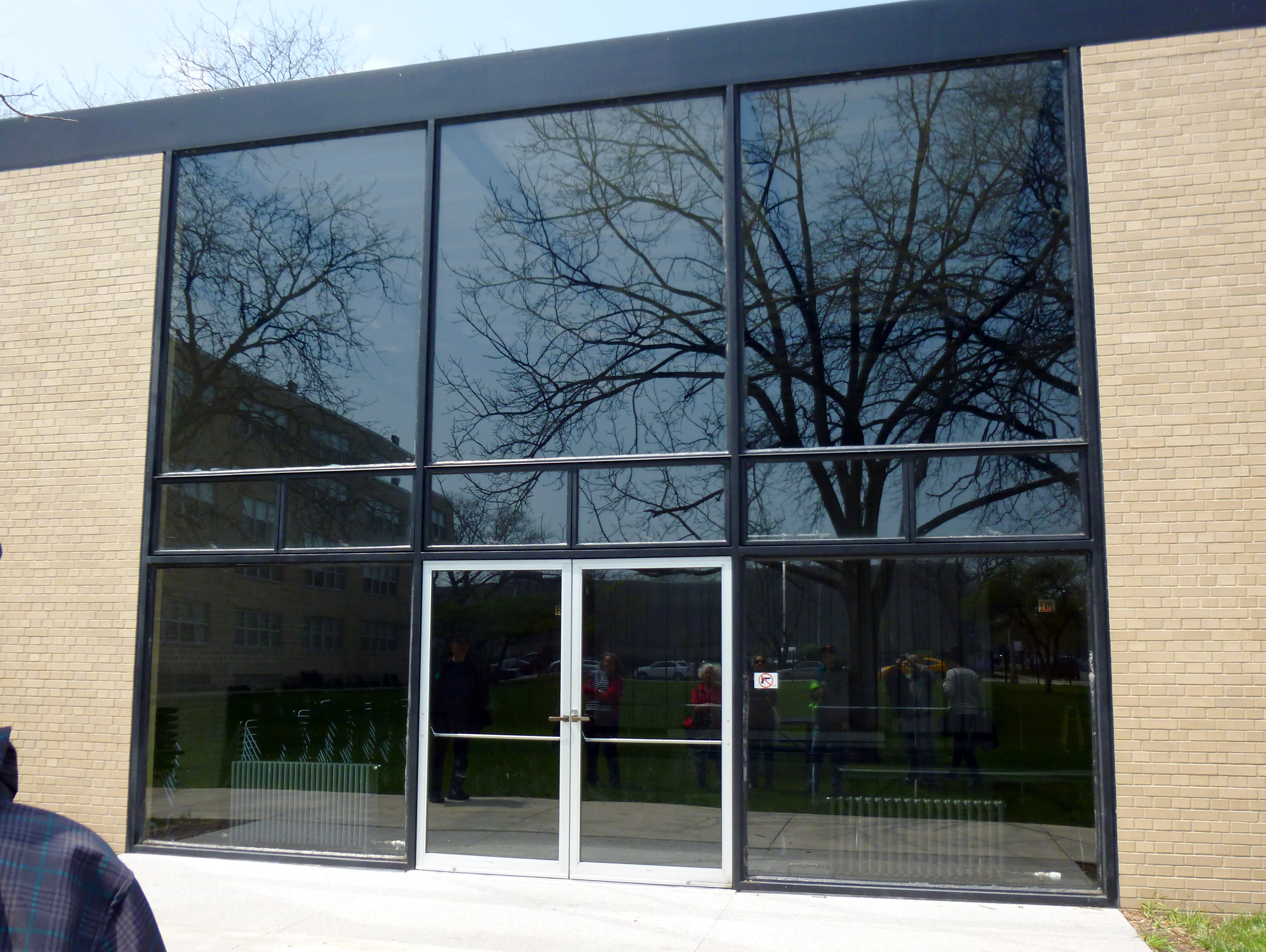
Carr Chapel in 2015

Robert F. Carr Memorial Chapel is a simple, unadorned rectangular box-like structure with a horizontally level roof sitting on a steel frame and a concrete layer.

Below the black steel cornice, there are several layers of uniform, load-bearing yellow bricks. The front and back of the chapel contain plate glass set in thin, black steel frames. The interior only has two sources of lighting: natural from the front entrance and artificial from the ceilings of the side walls. The dark terrazzo flooring and lack of quintessential religious decorations direct the focus to the thin stainless steel crucifix against Shantung silk curtains. An altar and its platform of solid Roman travertine sit below the cross.

== Renovations ==
During the 1990s, parts of the top and corners of the walls became damaged without repair for many years.

Mies van der Rohe Society raised more than $1 million to restore the chapel by the end of the summer in 2013. Donna Robertson, Dean of Architecture at the time, assisted in the restoration project, which began in 2008. Restoration was set for "roof replacement, repairs and replacement of exterior glass and steel, reconstruction of exterior brick corners, refinishing of terrazzo floor, cleaning and repairs to interior brick, upgraded mechanical and electrical components, refinishing of wood doors and benches, cleaning of concrete ceiling panels, lighting replacement, renovation to create ADA-compliant restroom and passageway, and accommodations for air conditioning." The roof and the rest of the exterior were replaced in the summer of 2009. The restoration project devoted special attention to replacing the drapes behind the cross to ensure that the material and color of the drapes suit the textures and shades of the rest of the chapel while also maintaining Mies' "clean" style. Gene Summers, Mies' assistant, was consulted to create the new curtains now composed of fire-retardant fibers and pongee silk. The curtain was woven in Italy, and the pleating was done by Cornel Erdbeer, the president of Ludwig Interiors. Chicago's Harboe Architects led the restoration and strove to maintain the "form and function" of the chapel, according to Chicago Tribune. The company prepared designs for the restoration of the roof, bricks, mortar joints, steel frames, flooring, doors, and benches and removed graffiti, shrubs, and water stains. Harboe specified replacement of the drainage system with a concealed rooftop edge for rainwater flow. Bricks needed for replacement of the cracked exterior wall came from an auxiliary wall of Bailey Hall, an IIT dorm constructed three years after the chapel. Bernacki & Associates restored the panels and chairs.
