= McCormick Tribune Campus Center =

Academic building in Chicago, Illinois

Coordinates: 41.83566°N 87.62584°W

Illinois Institute of Technology McCormick Tribune Campus Center
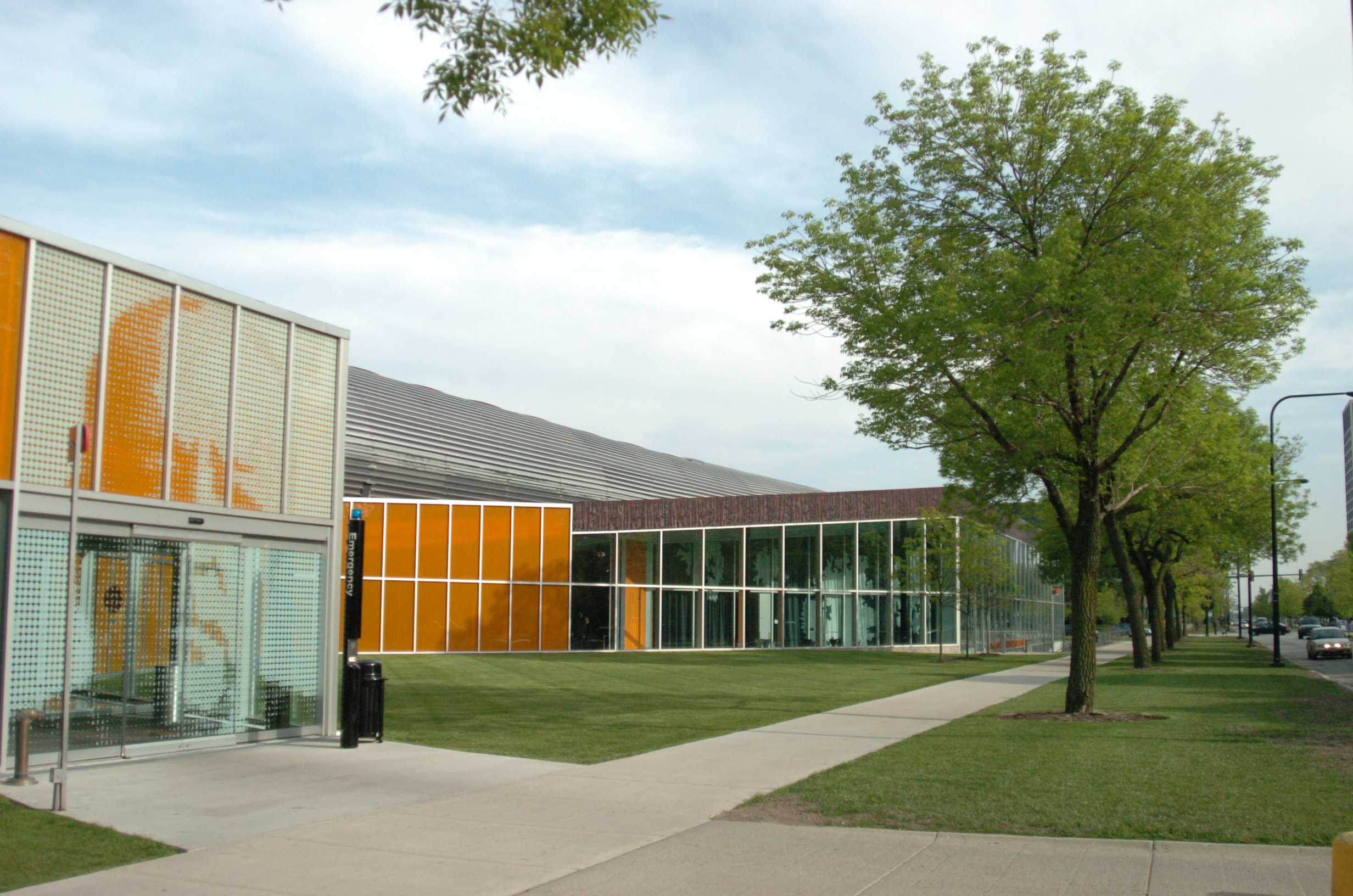
- McCormick Tribune Campus Center, from the northwest
- Interactive map of the Illinois Institute of Technology; McCormick Tribune Campus Center area
- Alternative names: MTCC

General information
- Type: Student union
- Opened: September 30, 2003

Technical details
- Floor count: 1

Design and construction
- Architect: Rem Koolhaas

Website
- https://www.iit.edu/event-services/meeting-spaces/mccormick-tribune-campus-center

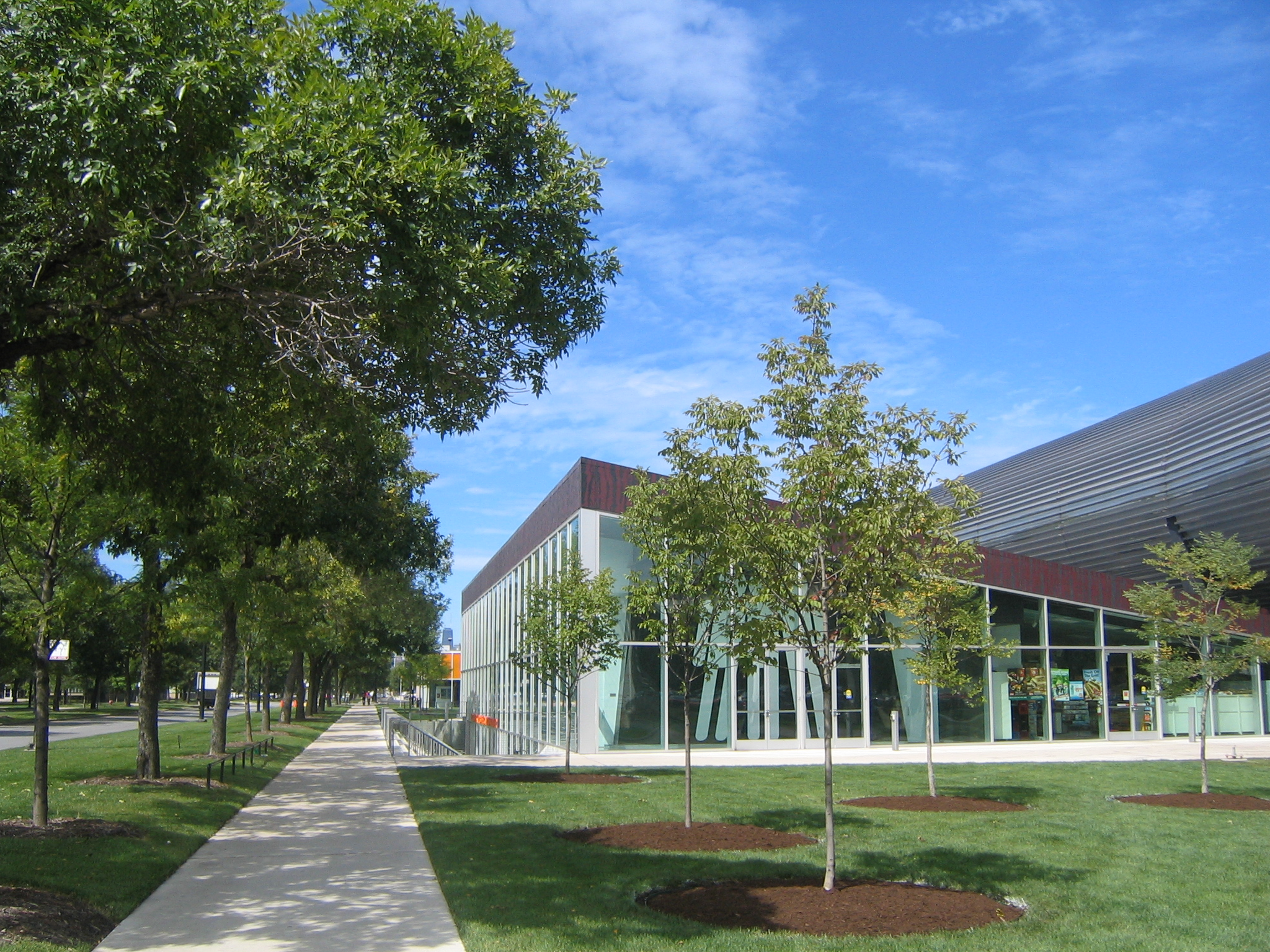
McCormick Tribune Campus Center viewed from the southwest

The McCormick Tribune Campus Center (MTCC) is a building on the main campus of the Illinois Institute of Technology, in the Bronzeville neighborhood on the south side of Chicago. The McCormick Tribune Campus Center opened September 30, 2003. A single-story 110,000-square-foot (10,000 m^{2}) building, it was the first building designed by Dutch architect Rem Koolhaas within the United States.

== History ==
Design of the building began in 1997 during an international architectural design competition hosted by the school. Finalists included Peter Eisenman, Helmut Jahn, Zaha Hadid, Kazuyo Sejima, and the winner, Rem Koolhaas. He worked with Chicago architecture firm Holabird & Root, especially on structural engineering issues.

The site was previously a heavily used student parking lot with tracks of the Green Line passing overhead. Koolhaas tracked movements of students across the lot, which led to diagonal passageways as the center's interior thoroughfares. Campus functions which had been spread around campus, such as the student bookstore and a post office, were relocated between these pathways. They also connected to a new cafeteria in a renovated 1953 Commons building designed by Ludwig Mies van der Rohe. Creating this connection involved battles with believers in the purity of Mies's designs who wished the Commons to continue to stand alone.

A major design challenge was the noise of the Green Line tracks passing over the lot. The solution was to enclose a 530-foot (160 m) section of the tracks in a stainless steel tube passing over the building. The tube's support structure is completely independent of the building's, to minimize vibration passing between them.

Even grander plans had once been in store for this site. Koolhaas's firm, the Office for Metropolitan Architecture hoped to develop a retail corridor along 33rd Street, at the southern edge of the lot. Budget constraints precluded this, however. Original designs included a bowling alley, basketball courts and a skate park, but these were removed from the final design, supposedly because of security concerns.

The original project budget was $25 million (equivalent to $43.8 million in 2025), but the ultimate cost was $48 million (equivalent to $84 million in 2025). However, the university wanted an architecturally significant building to add onto its original main campus, which is home to the densest concentration of buildings designed by Ludwig Mies van der Rohe in the world. One month earlier, a residence hall designed by Helmut Jahn a block away made this the second in a set of modern buildings to open on IIT's campus, the first new buildings since 1971.

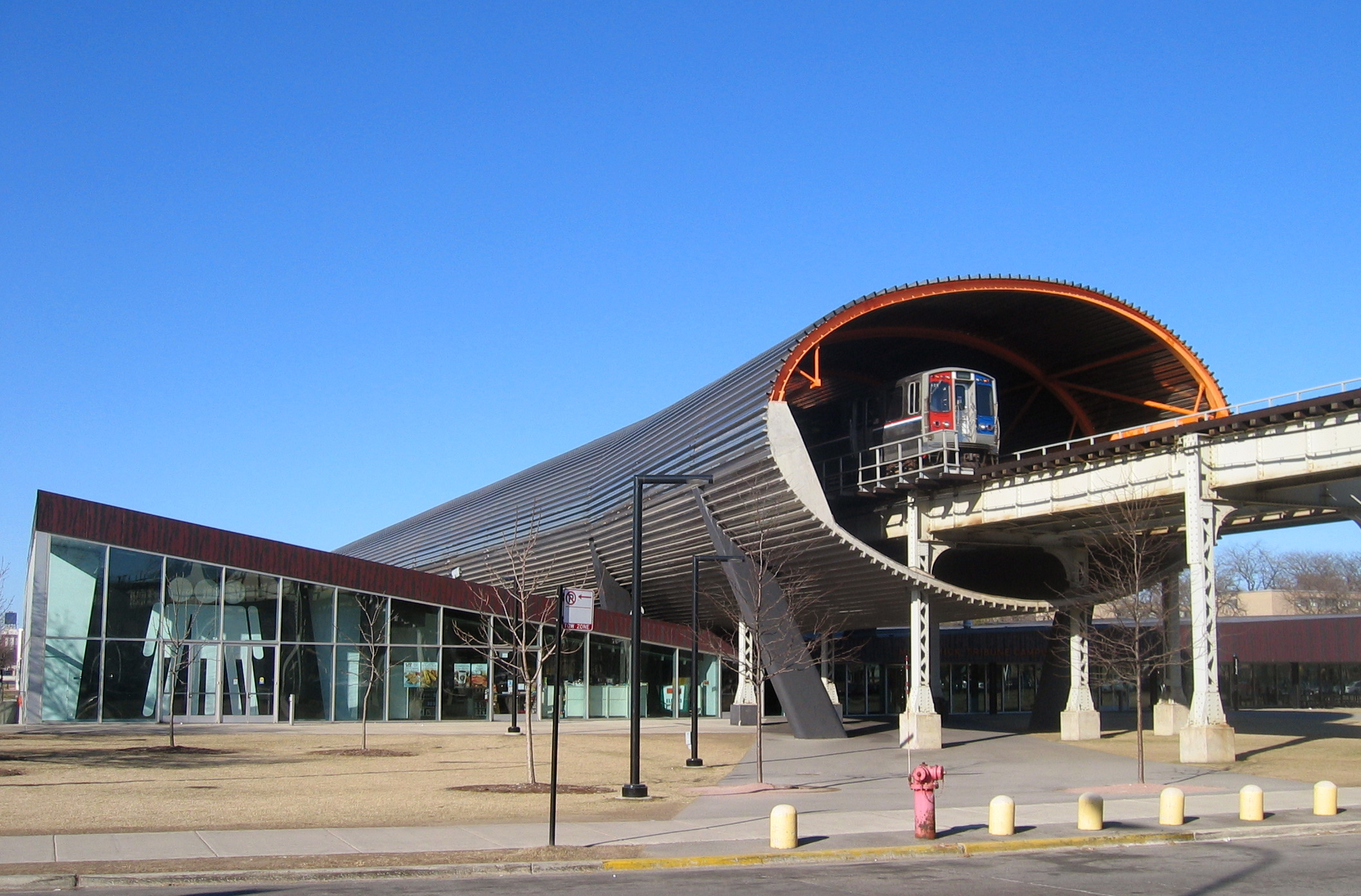
A southbound Green Line train passing through the stainless steel tube shielding the McCormick Tribune Campus Center from excessive noise

Student reception of the building has been lukewarm. While it does provide much needed space for student organization offices and meeting space the design of the building has many functional difficulties, particularly loud levels of noise throughout the building.

== Program ==
The building serves as a central hub for student life on campus. As of December 2010, it housed the campus mail room, dining facilities, a coffee shop, 7–11 convenience store, the Campus Information Center, the Office of Student Life, and many meeting spaces and offices. Thanks to its proximity to Shimer College, which is located nearby on the IIT campus, the building also frequently hosts Shimer events.

== Sources ==
- Cramer, Ned (December 2003). "Tunnel of Love" (PDF). Architecture: The AIA Journal. Vol. 92, no. 12. pp. 102–108. ProQuest 227890342.
- Coleman, Cindy (January 2004). "Too cool for school". Interior Design. Vol. 75, no. 1. pp. 168–177. ProQuest 234950229.
- Wright, Gordon (December 2003). "Koolhaas Encounters Mies". Building Design & Construction. Vol. 44, no. 12. pp. 15–22. ProQuest 211013622.
