= State Street Village =

Dormitory buildings in Chicago, Illinois

Coordinates: 41°50′1.4″N 87°37′34.2″W

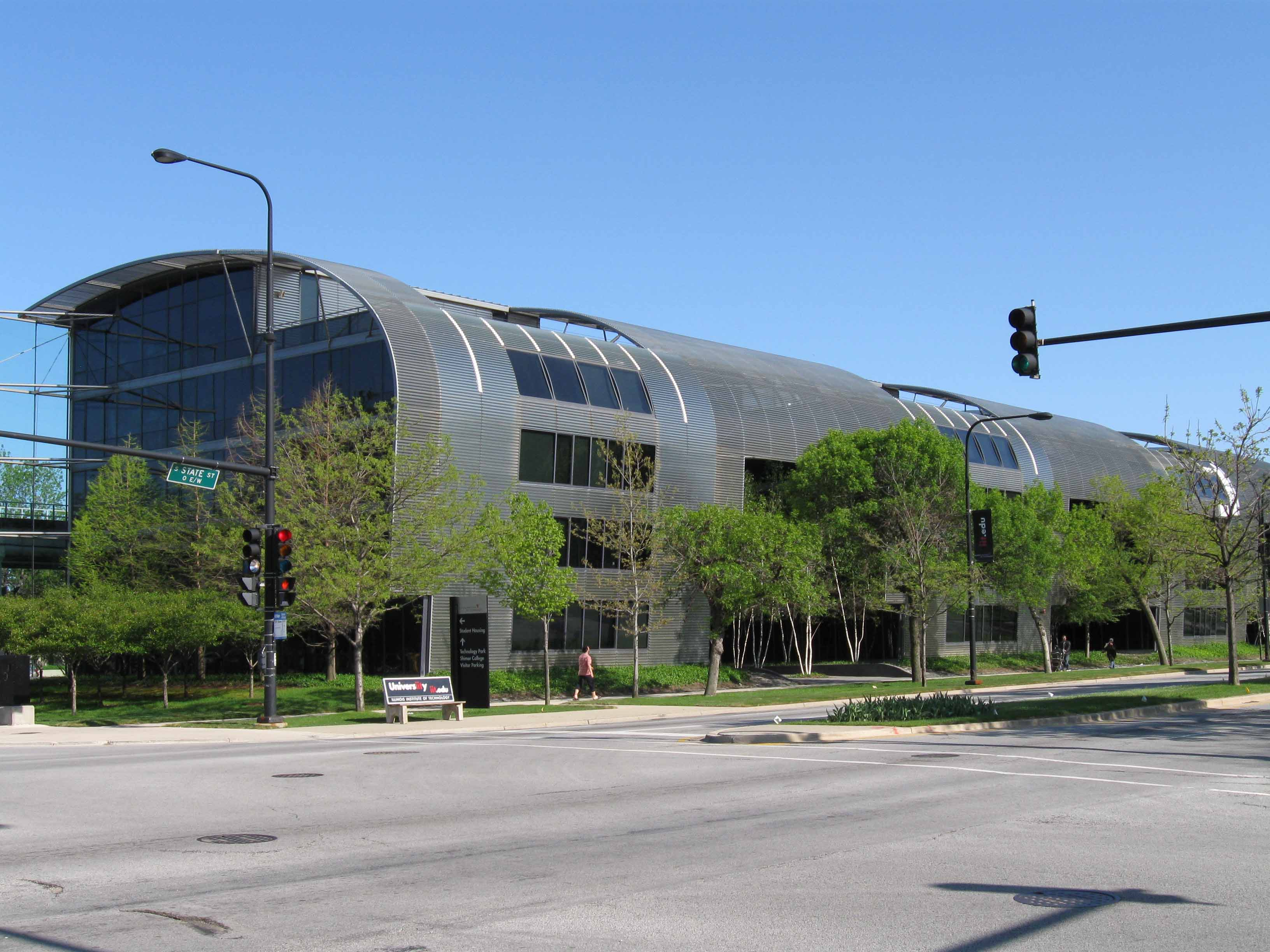
Rowe Village | State Street View

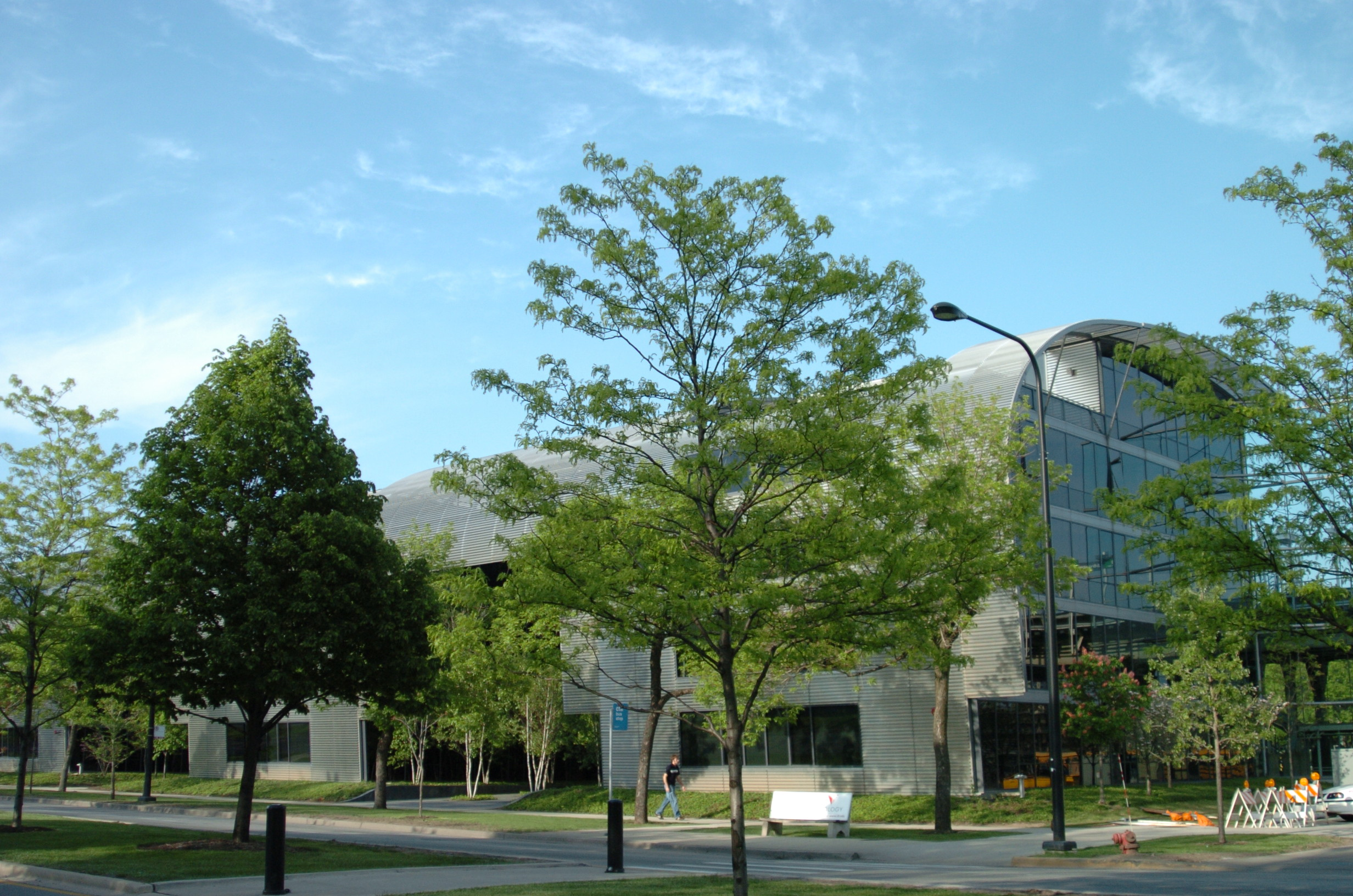
Rowe Village

Rowe Village, previously known as State Street Village, is a residence hall for the Illinois Institute of Technology in Chicago, Illinois. Designed by Helmut Jahn of Murphy-Jahn Associates, the dormitory was completed in 2003.

Although it appears that Rowe Village is a single continuous building, it consists of three different buildings built next to each other and sharing the same facade; they are commonly referred to as "north", "middle", and "south". Each building has five stories, with dorms on the "north" and "south" sides of the building and an elevator and common area splitting the two sections in the middle. Access can only be gained via ID card scanners. Suites usually consist of two double rooms that are connected by a shared central bathroom.

Rowe Village also has kitchens and laundry rooms on all floors, with a lounge and open deck located on the top floor of each of the three separate buildings.
