= Robert F. Christy =

Canadian-American physicist (1916–2012)

Robert Frederick Christy
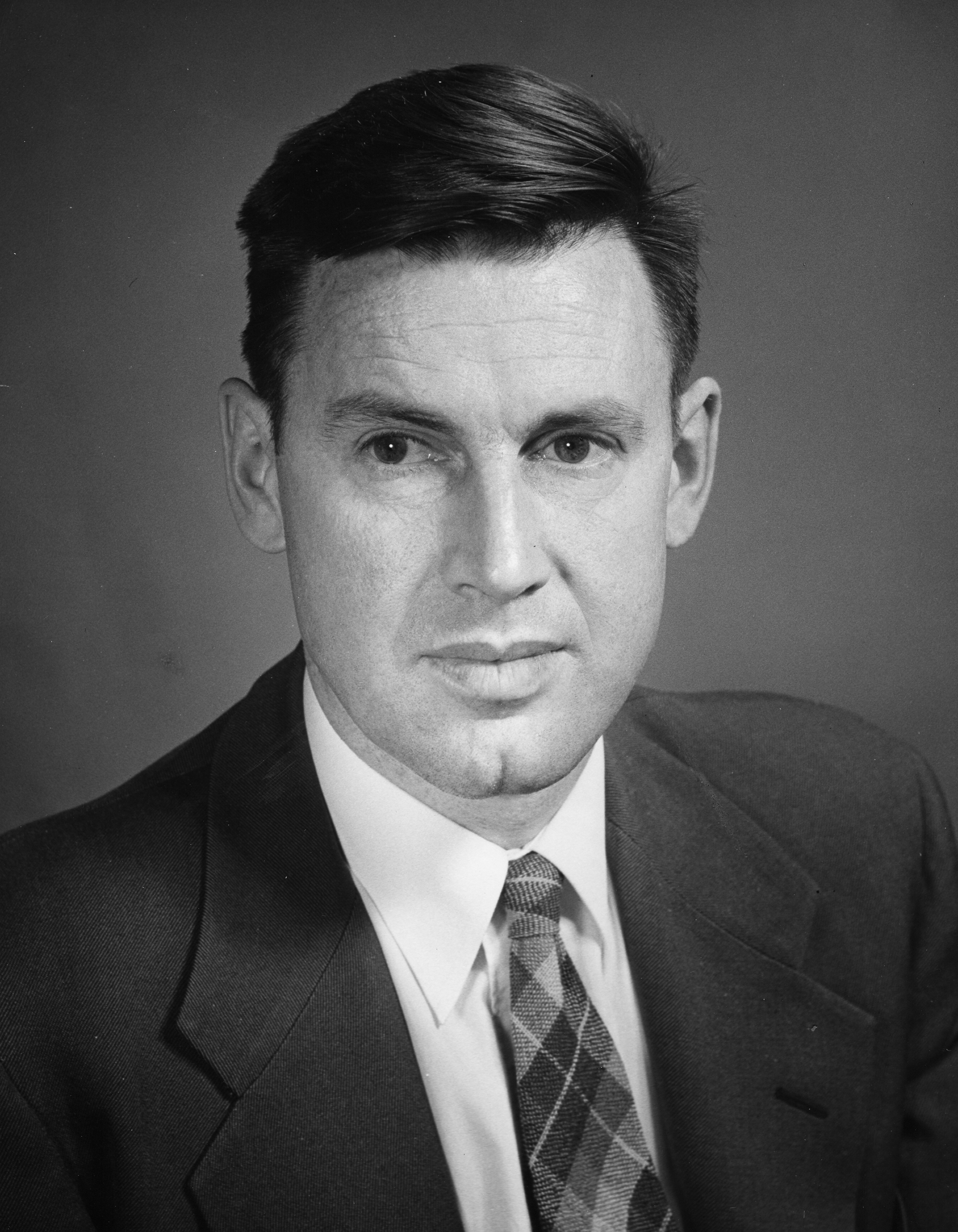
- Robert F. Christy c. 1959

Acting President of the California Institute of Technology
- In office 1977–1978
- Preceded by: Harold Brown
- Succeeded by: Marvin Leonard Goldberger

Personal details
- Born: Robert Frederick Cohen; May 14, 1916 Vancouver, British Columbia, Canada
- Died: October 3, 2012 (aged 96) Pasadena, California, U.S.
- Citizenship: Canadian; American
- Scientific career
- Education: University of British Columbia (B.A., M.A.); University of California, Berkeley (Ph.D.)
- Known for: Christy pits
- Awards: Eddington Medal (1967); Bronze Academic Medal of the Governor-General of Canada (1932)
- Fields: Physics
- Workplaces: Illinois Institute of Technology; Metallurgical Laboratory; Los Alamos Laboratory; California Institute of Technology
- Thesis: Cosmic-ray burst production and the spin of the mesotron (1941)
- Doctoral advisor: Robert Oppenheimer

Robert Frederick Christy (May 14, 1916 – October 3, 2012) was a Canadian-American theoretical physicist and later astrophysicist who was one of the last surviving people to have worked on the Manhattan Project during World War II. He briefly served as acting president of California Institute of Technology (Caltech).

A graduate of the University of British Columbia (UBC) in the 1930s where he studied physics, he followed George Volkoff, who was a year ahead of him, to the University of California, Berkeley, where he was accepted as a graduate student by Robert Oppenheimer, the leading theoretical physicist in the United States at that time. Christy received his doctorate in 1941 and joined the physics department of Illinois Institute of Technology.

In 1942 he joined the Manhattan Project at the University of Chicago, where he was recruited by Enrico Fermi to join the effort to build the first nuclear reactor, having been recommended as a theory resource by Oppenheimer. When Oppenheimer formed the Manhattan Project's Los Alamos Laboratory in 1943, Christy was one of the early recruits to join the Theory Group. Christy is generally credited with the insight that a solid sub-critical mass of plutonium could be explosively compressed into supercriticality, a great simplification of earlier concepts of implosion requiring hollow shells. For this insight the solid-core plutonium model is often referred to as the "Christy pit".

After the war, Christy briefly joined the University of Chicago Physics department before being recruited to join the Caltech faculty in 1946 when Oppenheimer decided it was not practical for him to resume his academic activities. He stayed at Caltech for his academic career, serving as Department Chair, Provost and Acting President. In 1960 Christy turned his attention to astrophysics, creating some of the first practical computation models of stellar oscillations. For this work Christy was awarded the Eddington Medal of the Royal Astronomical Society in 1967. In the 1980s and 1990s Christy participated in the National Research Council's Committee on Dosimetry, an extended effort to better understand the actual radiation exposure due to the bombs dropped on Japan, and on the basis of that learning, better understand the medical risks of radiation exposure.

== Early life ==
Robert Frederick Cohen was born on May 14, 1916, in Vancouver, British Columbia, the son of Moise Jacques Cohen, an electrical engineer, and his wife Hattie Alberta née Mackay, a school teacher. He was named Robert after his maternal great uncle Robert Wood, and Frederick after Frederick Alexander Christy, the second husband of his maternal grandmother. He had an older brother, John, who was born in 1913. Moise changed the family surname to Christy by deed poll on August 31, 1918. On November 4, Moise was accidentally electrocuted at work. Hattie died after goitre surgery in 1926. Christy and his brother were then cared for by Robert Wood, their grandmother Alberta Mackay, and their great aunt Maud Mackay.

Christy was educated at Magee High School, and graduated in 1932 with the highest examination score in the province of British Columbia. He was awarded the Governor General's Academic Medal, and, importantly in view of his family's limited ability to pay, free tuition to attend the University of British Columbia (UBC). At the award dinner he met the second-place winner, Dagmar Elizabeth von Lieven, whom he dated while at UBC. He received his Bachelor of Arts (BA) degree in mathematics and physics with first class honors in 1935, and his Master of Arts (MA) degree in 1937, writing a thesis on "Electron attachment and negative ion formation in oxygen".

George Volkoff, a friend of Christy who was a year ahead of him at UBC, was accepted as a graduate student at the University of California, Berkeley, by Robert Oppenheimer, who led the most active school of theoretical physics in the United States at that time. This inspired Christy to apply to the University of California as well. He was accepted, and was awarded a fellowship for his first year. At Berkeley he shared an apartment with Volkoff, Robert Cornog, Ken McKenzie and McKenzie's wife Lynn McKenzie. For his thesis, Oppenheimer had him look at mesotrons, subatomic particles called muons today, that had recently been found in cosmic rays. They were so-called because they were more massive than electrons but less massive than protons. With the help of Shuichi Kusaka he performed detailed calculations of the particle's spin. He published two papers on mesotrons with Kusaka in the Physical Review, which formed the basis of his 1941 Doctor of Philosophy (PhD) thesis.

== Manhattan Project ==
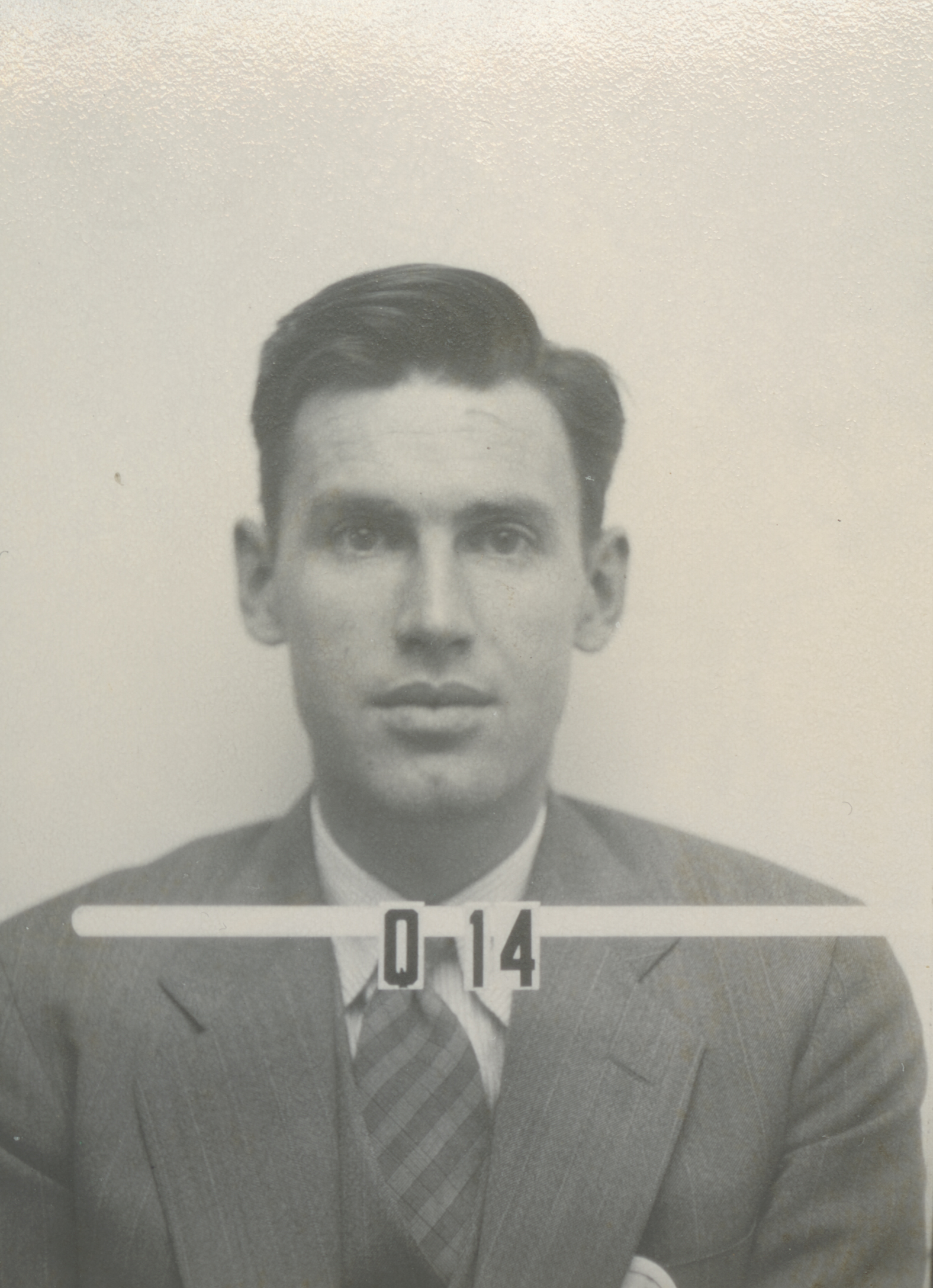
Robert Christy's wartime Los Alamos security badge

Christy could have graduated in 1940, but could not then be a teaching assistant, and this would have left him jobless and without income. In 1941, Oppenheimer found him a post at the physics department at Illinois Institute of Technology (IIT). In May 1941, he married Dagmar von Lieven. They had two sons: Thomas Edward (Ted), born in 1944, and Peter Robert, born in 1946. IIT paid Christy $200 per month to teach 27 hours per week for 11 months per annum. To keep abreast of developments in physics, he attended seminars at the University of Chicago. This brought him to the attention of Eugene Wigner, who hired him for the same money that IIT was paying him but as a full-time research assistant, commencing in January 1942.

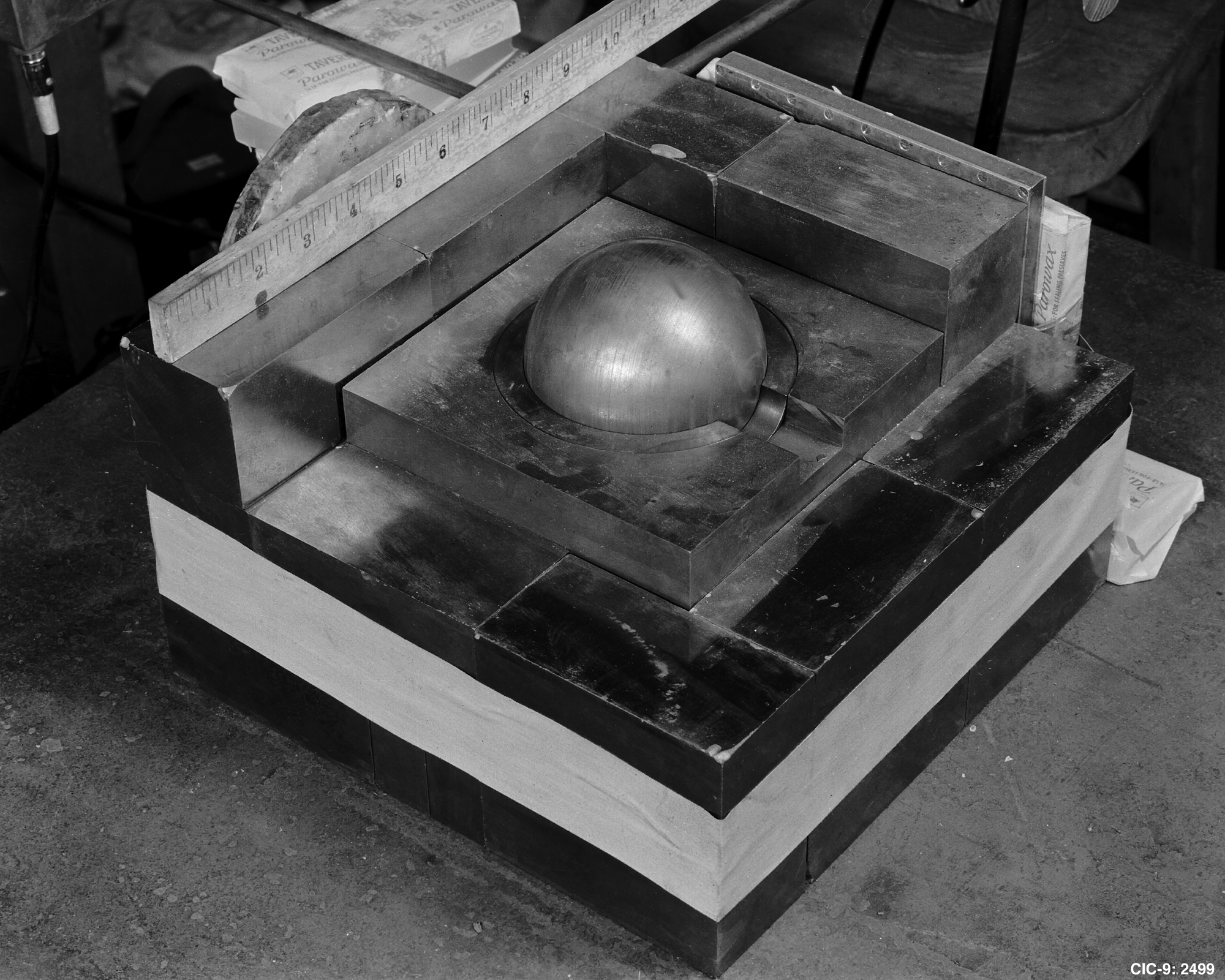
A model of a Christy pit

Enrico Fermi and his team from Columbia University arrived at the University of Chicago in January 1942 as part of an effort to concentrate the Manhattan Project's reactor work at the new Metallurgical Laboratory. Fermi arranged with Wigner for Christy to join his group, which was building a nuclear reactor, which Fermi called a "pile", in the squash court under Stagg Field at the University of Chicago. Construction began on November 6, 1942, and Christy was present when Chicago Pile-1 went critical on December 2.

In early 1943, Christy joined Oppenheimer's Los Alamos Laboratory in New Mexico, where he became an American citizen in 1943 or 1944. Hans Bethe, the head of T (Theoretical) Division, detailed his physicists to assist with the projects at the laboratory. With his knowledge of reactors, Christy's assignment was to help Donald W. Kerst's Water Boiler group. The Water Boiler was an aqueous homogeneous reactor intended as a laboratory instrument to test critical mass calculations and the effect of various tamper materials. It was the first reactor to use enriched uranium as a fuel, and the first to use liquid fuel in the form of soluble uranium sulfate dissolved in water. Christy estimated that it would require 600 grams (21 oz) of pure uranium-235, a figure he subsequently revised to 575 grams (20.3 oz). When the reactor went critical on May 9, 1944, with 565 grams (19.9 oz), the accuracy of Christy's figures raised the laboratory's confidence in T Division's calculations.

The discovery by Emilio Segrè's group in April and May 1944 of high levels of plutonium-240 in reactor-produced plutonium meant that an implosion-type nuclear weapon was required, but studies indicated that this would be extremely difficult to achieve. By August 1944, the calculations had been made of how an ideal spherical implosion would work; the problem was how to make it work in the real world where jets and spalling were a problem. Christy worked in Rudolf Peierls's T-1 Group, which studied the theory of implosion. He suggested the possibility of using a solid plutonium core that would form a critical mass when compressed. This was an ultra-conservative design that solved the problem of jets by brute force. It became known as the "Christy pit" or "Christy gadget", "gadget" being the laboratory euphemism for a bomb. However the solid pit was intrinsically less efficient than a hollow pit, and it required a modulated neutron initiator to start the chain reaction. Christy worked with Klaus Fuchs, Paul Stein and Hans Bethe to develop a suitable initiator design, which became known as an "urchin". The Gadget used in the Trinity nuclear test and the Fat Man used in the atomic bombing of Nagasaki used Christy pits.

Later in life, Christy agreed to give a number of both oral history and video interviews in which he discussed his role in the Manhattan Project and latter interests.

== Later life ==
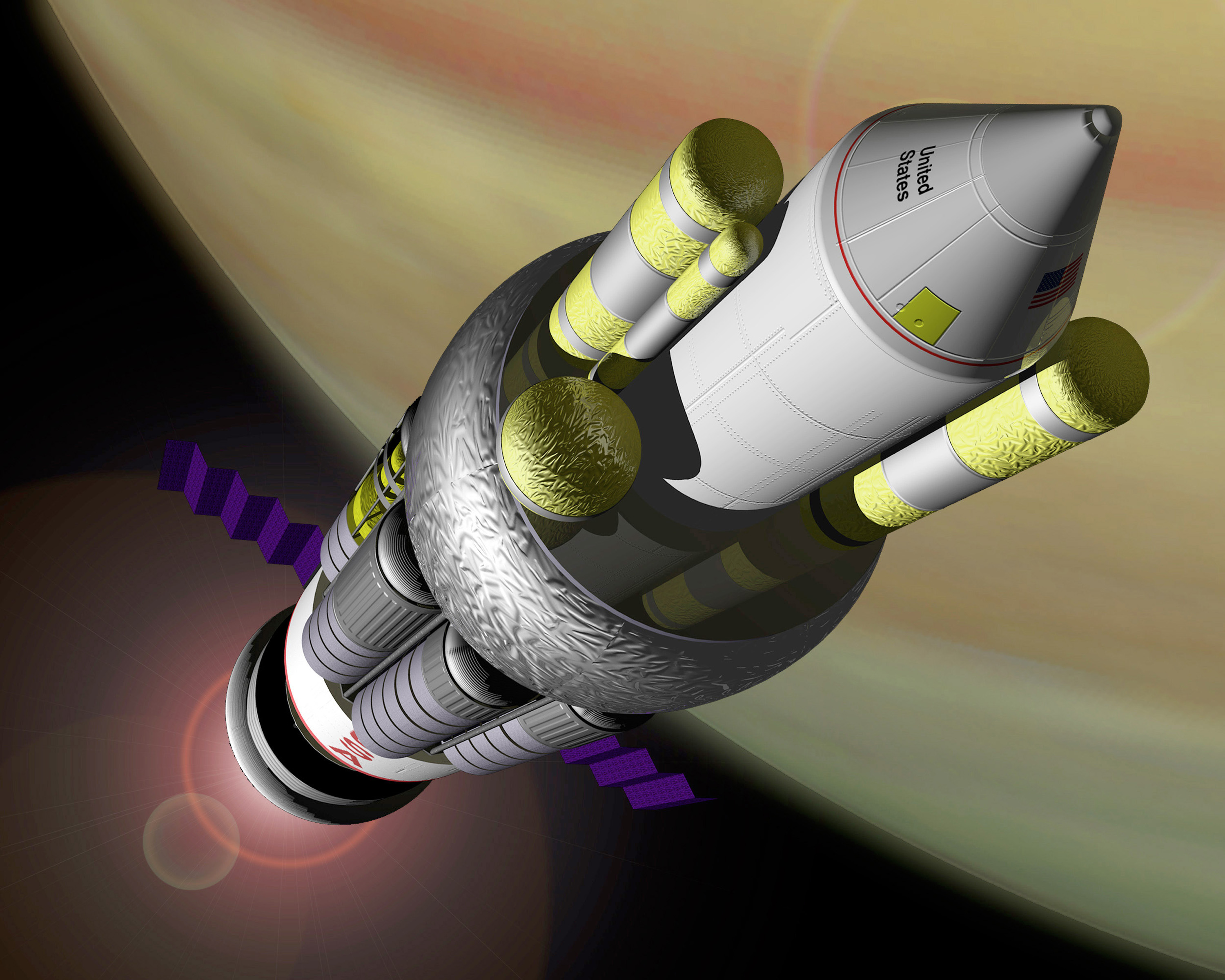
An artist's conception of the Project Orion spacecraft

After the war ended, Christy accepted an assistant professorship at the University of Chicago, at a salary of $5,000 per annum, twice what he had been making before the war. He moved back to Chicago in February 1946, but suitable housing was hard to find in the immediate post-war period, and Christy and his family shared a mansion with Edward Teller and his family.

Before the war, Oppenheimer had spent part of each year teaching at California Institute of Technology (Caltech). Christy was one of Oppenheimer's Berkeley students who made the trip down to Pasadena, California, each year to continue studying with Oppenheimer. After the war, Oppenheimer decided that with his additional responsibilities he could no longer continue this arrangement. The head of the W. K. Kellogg Radiation Laboratory at Caltech, Charles Lauritsen therefore asked Oppenheimer for the name of a theoretical physicist that he would recommend as a replacement. Oppenheimer recommended Christy. Willy Fowler then approached Christy with an offer of a full-time position at Caltech at $5,400 per annum, and Christy accepted. He remained at Caltech for the rest of his academic career. The drawback to working at Caltech was that neither Lauritsen nor Fowler was a theoretical physicist, so a heavy workload fell on Christy. This was recognised by a pay raise to $10,000 per annum in 1954.

Christy joined Oppenheimer, Lauritsen and Robert Bacher, who joined the faculty at Caltech in 1949, in Project Vista, a detailed 1951 study on how Western Europe could be defended against the Soviet Union. Christy was distraught at the outcome of the 1954 Oppenheimer security hearing. When he encountered Teller, who had testified against Oppenheimer, at Los Alamos in 1954, Christy publicly refused to shake Teller's hand. "I viewed Oppenheimer as a god", he later recalled, "and I was sure that he was not a treasonable person." Asked about his relationship with Teller in 2006, Christy said:

I've seen him from time to time. Our relationship has remained cool. Since that time, I have disagreed with him in a number of areas. For example, the Strategic Defense Initiative. I have disagreed with him, but I have not argued with him publicly, because Teller operates at a much different level than I do. He's a confidant of presidents; I'm not. As I say, I merely disagree privately, and that's the way it is.

In 1956, Christy was one of a number of scientists from Caltech who publicly called for a ban on atmospheric nuclear testing. The 1963 Partial Nuclear Test Ban Treaty that Christy advocated put an end to one of his most unusual projects. He worked with Freeman Dyson on Project Orion, the design of a spacecraft propelled by atomic bombs.

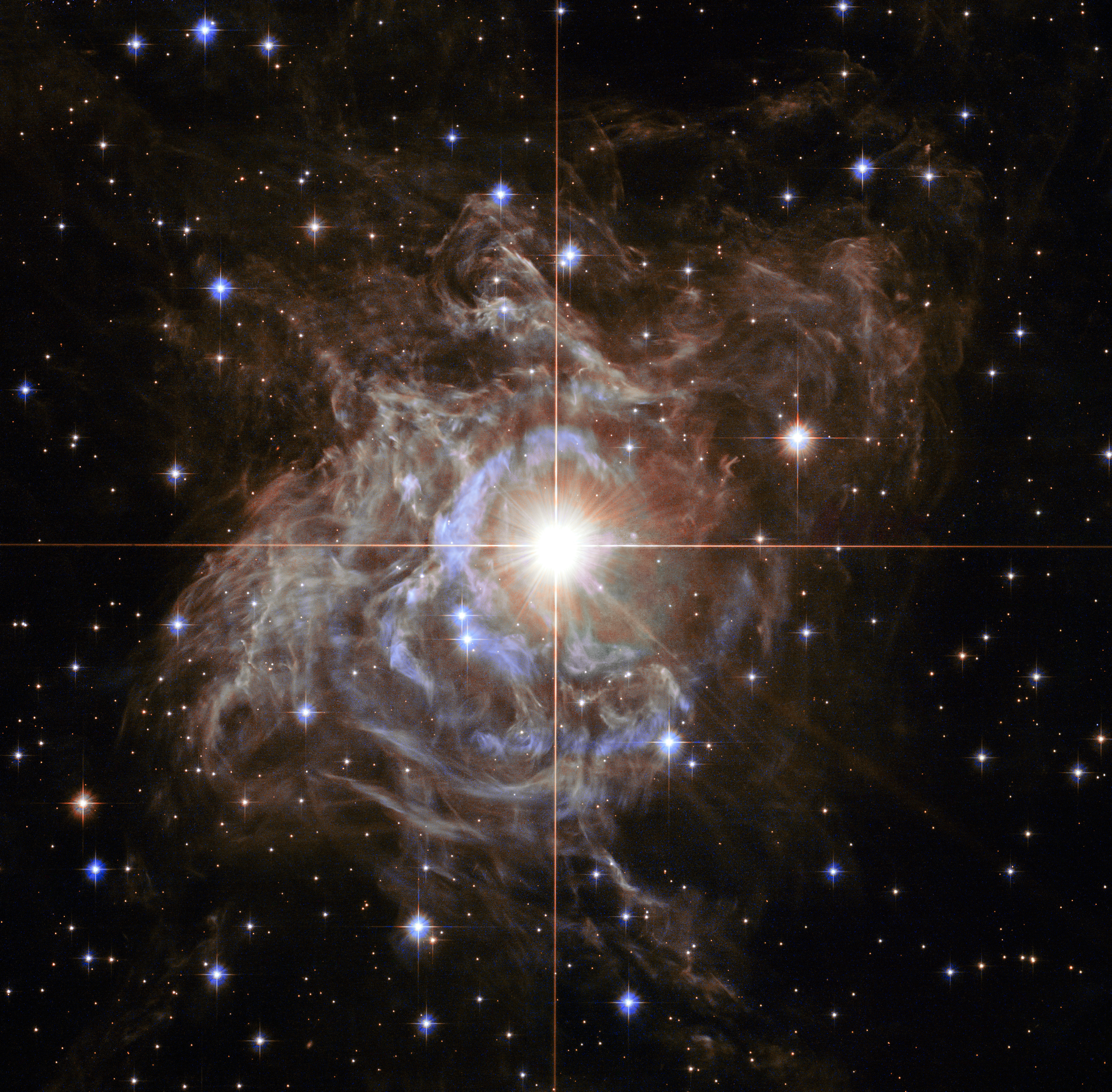
RS Puppis, a Cepheid variable star. Christy explained why they pulsate.

During a sabbatical year at Princeton University in 1960, Christy began an investigation of Cepheid variables and the smaller RR Lyrae variables, classes of luminous variable stars. At the time it was a mystery as to why they varied. He used the knowledge of the hydrodynamics of implosion gained at Los Alamos during the war to explain this phenomenon. This earned him the Royal Astronomical Society's Eddington Medal for contributions to theoretical astrophysics in 1967.

Christy was appointed vice president and Provost of Caltech in 1970. Under Christy and President Harold Brown Caltech expanded its humanities and added economics to allow (or perhaps to compel—undergrads were required to take 25% of their units in "humanities") students to broaden their education. He had David Morrisroe appointed as vice president for Financial Affairs, and they steered Caltech through the financially stringent 1970s. The first women were admitted as undergraduates in Fall 1970.

When Jenijoy La Belle, who had been hired in 1969 but refused tenure in 1974, filed suit with the Equal Employment Opportunity Commission, Christy pressed for the case to be settled and La Belle to be given tenure. The EEOC ruled against Caltech in 1977, adding that she had been paid less than male colleagues. La Belle received tenure in 1979.

In 1970 he became romantically involved with Inge-Juliana Sackman, a fellow physicist 26 years his junior. He divorced Dagmar in early 1971, and married Juliana on August 4, 1973. They had two daughters, Illia Juliana Lilly Christy, born in 1974, and Alexandra Roberta (Alexa) Christy, born in 1976.

Christy briefly became acting President of Caltech in 1977 when Brown left to become Secretary of Defense. Christy returned to teaching after Marvin L. Goldberger became president in 1978. He became Institute Professor of Theoretical Physics in 1983, and Institute Professor Emeritus in 1986.

Christy died on October 3, 2012. He was survived by his wife Juliana, their two daughters, Illia and Alexa, and his two sons, Peter and Ted. He was buried at Mountain View Cemetery in Altadena, California.

== Notes ==
Academic offices
Preceded by Harold Brown	Acting President of the California Institute of Technology; 1977–1978	Succeeded by Marvin Goldberger
