= Adam Ronikier =

Polish count and politician (1881–1952)

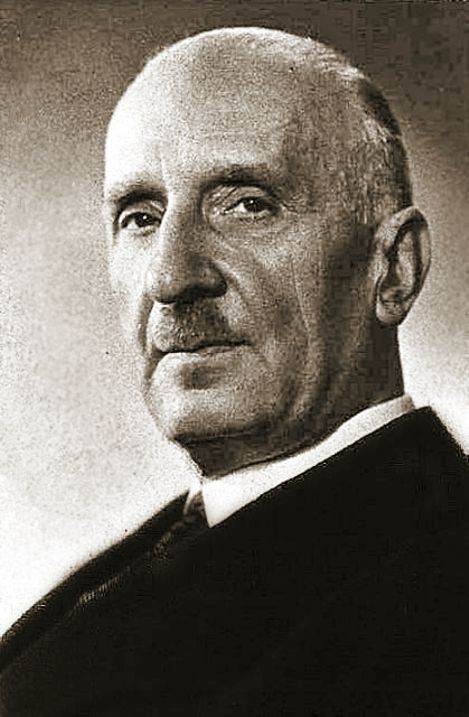

Personal details
- Born: November 1, 1881 Warsaw, Congress Poland
- Died: 4 September 1952 (aged 70) Orchard Lake, United States
- Education: Riga Technical University
- Occupation: Politician

Adam Feliks Ronikier (1 November 1881, Warsaw – 4 September 1952, Orchard Lake, Michigan) was a Polish count and conservative politician.

== Biography ==
During the World War I, he was a president of the Central Welfare Council (Rada Główna Opiekuńcza) in the period 1916–1918 in Kingdom of Poland, and again during the World War II from June 1940 to October 1943 in General Government. The council received financial support both from the German authorities and (clandestinely) from the Polish Government in Exile.

=== World War II ===
World War II Establishment of the Central Welfare Council After the outbreak of World War II in September 1939, he organized meetings of the anti-Sanation opposition in his Warsaw apartment, proclaiming the need to prioritize the defense of the nation over the defense of the state. After the capitulation of Warsaw, he joined the Capital Committee for Social Self-Help (SKSS).

On October 8, 1939, he received Lieutenant Colonel von Hoeltz from the Bavarian artillery regiment in Warsaw, who asked him about Polish sentiments towards the Germans on behalf of SS Standartenführer Harry von Craushaar, Hans Frank's deputy and head of the civilian board at the command of the 8th Army. This conversation was condemned by Mieczysław Niedziałkowski at a meeting of the SKSS. In October 1939, Ronikier also spoke with a high-ranking official of the Third Reich, Weiss von Ulogg, an envoy of the Prussian Prime Minister, Marshal Hermann Göring, who also probed the Poles' willingness to cooperate. Before Ulogg left for Berlin in November, Ronikier handed him a memorandum intended for Göring, prepared together with Roman Rybarski, Norbert Barlicki and Bolesław Lutomski, in which he postulated the establishment of a new social welfare institution, an issuing bank and a civic guard to prevent "anarchy". He passed a copy of this note to Herbert Hoover's envoy and delegate of the Commission for Polish Relief (CPR, also known as the Polish Food Commission and commonly known as the Hoover Commission), a businessman active in Poland, William C. McDonald, who – after October talks in Berlin and a tour of the General Government with the head of the National Socialist People's Social Welfare (NSV) Erich Hilgenfeldt – contacted Ronikier in November about establishing an institution for distributing American aid. Ronikier held several days of conferences with McDonald and another CPR activist, Columba Patrick Murray Jr., partly at the United States Embassy in Warsaw with the participation of Consul George Haering. He agreed with them on the exclusively Polish nature of the planned organization, its monopoly on the distribution of aid sent from the USA and direct control by American donors.

On November 19, 1939, he presented this project of the organization at the meeting of the SKSS, where, due to the rejection by other candidates of cooperation with the Germans, he received conditional support and authorization to start talks with Archbishop Adam Sapieha and the Kraków circles. His candidacy for the head of the organization was put forward by Janusz Machnicki. After the Germans imposed their conditions on the Americans and the Polish Red Cross withdrew from establishing a dependent welfare organization under German supervision, Ronikier was summoned to talks in Kraków on December 13 by Fritz Arlt, head of the Department of Population and Welfare Affairs of the Social Welfare Department in the Office of the General Governor and deputy head of the department, to whom Ronikier had been recommended by Maria Tarnowska, a colleague from the Polish Red Cross. While in Kraków, he criticized the parallel negotiations between the SKSS and Wilhelm von Janowski from the NSV, which were subsequently interrupted by Arlt's superior, Herbert Heinrich. He submitted to Arlt a project agreed with McDonald for an organization modeled on the Central Welfare Council from World War I. During his next visit to Kraków in January 1940, he obtained Franek's consent to establish the Central Welfare Council with a narrow staff and took the position of vice-president alongside Janusz Radziwiłł, concentrating most of the real powers in his hands. At the beginning of February, he reported to Cardinal Sapieha, who indicated his collaborators. From 22 January to 29 May 1940, he negotiated the statute of the Central Welfare Council with the Germans in detail, with the support of Archbishops Sapieha and Stanisław Gall. From the beginning of the occupation, he sought to minimise Polish losses and avert the risk of socialist revolution through political cooperation with the Germans. At the end of 1939, at a secret meeting with Stanisław Tyszkiewicz, he stated the need to establish a pro-German Polish government. During this period, he encouraged Maciej Rataj to accept the position of prime minister of the collaborationist government, meeting with a sharp refusal.

In December 1943, he met Horace Coock, British political agent in Warsaw. In February 1944, Ronikier was arrested by Gestapo in Kraków for three weeks. In July 1944, he again discussed with SS-Obersturmbannführer Hans Gerd Schindhelm to save lives of many thousands of Polish young people in Warsaw who were ready to fight against Germans to the death without any chance to win. Count Ronikier had presented an idea to end a German occupation of Warsaw without military combat – Polish Home Army takes Warsaw from German hands. It was supported by some German politicians and field officers (almost like the liberation of Paris in August 1944). Finally, the Warsaw Uprising broke out on 1 August 1944.

After the capitulation of the Warsaw Uprising, he led, alongside Feliks Burdecki, a propaganda campaign in support of the German war effort against the USSR by the population of the General Government. On the authority of Schindhelm and SS Obersturmführer Alfred Kolf, and with the support of Archbishop Sapieha, for this purpose he founded the Bureau of Studies in Kraków at the end of October 1944, with its headquarters in the Pusłowski Palace. It was an initiative of a political collaboration nature, which raised concerns among the underground authorities, but due to the lack of broader social support it was discredited by them as frivolous. The Bureau, which left no trace of formal activity, was composed of about 70 people representing mainly the so-called landed gentry and intelligentsia activists with views described in the AK circle as close to those of the National Armed Forces. They included Józef Mackiewicz, Aleksander Bocheński, Dominik Horodyński, Stanisław Stomma, Tomasz Rostworowski, Alfred Wielopolski, Henryk Stefan Potocki, Bogdan Drucki-Lubecki and his brother Ksawery, Eugeniusz Jeleniewski, Stanisław Milewski, Jerzy Rogowicz, Antoni Starzeński, former Minister of the Treasury Jerzy Michalski, former Nonpartisan Bloc for Cooperation with the Government senator Zygmunt Jundziłł, Ronikier secretary Andrzej Ciechanowiecki and RGO activists Kazimierz Okulicz, Stanisław Tyszkiewicz and Antoni Plater-Zyberk. The work of the Office, in which Gestapo officers and German officials participated, consisted of preparing the ground for a collaborationist Polish self-government, which would take over responsibility for providing contingents for the German army in exchange for enabling care for forced labourers in the Reich and restoring secondary school education.

The communiqués of the newspapers at that time included references to Poland and Poles. Ronikier announced the Germans' readiness to recognize the London government in the face of the establishment of the Polish Committee of National Liberation under the protection of the Soviet Union. He appealed to abandon resistance to the Germans in order to "save the Polish biological power of the nation" and to conclude an anti-communist alliance with the occupier. His goal was to establish a new center of power in the country after the defeat of the Warsaw Uprising, which would replace the Polish underground state, which he believed was discredited. In addition to plans to create Polish self-government in the lands west of the Vistula, he also conceived concepts of a federation with Czechoslovakia, Hungary and Lithuania. The action was not officially condemned by the Polish underground, perhaps due to its support by Cardinal Sapieha. Counterintelligence reports of the Government Delegation for Poland (codenamed "Wir") from December 1944 emphasized the full approval of the German authorities for "Count Roniker's Action" and its connection with the German desire to exploit anti-communist sentiments in society to achieve war benefits.

Ronikier also began attacks on the RGO in the autumn of 1944, the aim of which was to remove president Tchórznicki, assessed in the underground as an initiative inspired by the Germans. He accused the Council of failing to take care of the people of Warsaw. He was invited to the December meeting of the RGO, where he clashed with Ludwik Dunin, who opposed his contacts with the Gestapo. On January 2, 1945, he demanded in a letter from Tchórznicki that he resign to Sapieha.

He left Poland on 18 January 1945, because of threat of arrest and possible death penalty, just before the Soviet army drove the German forces from Cracow. He died in exile in the United States.
