= Sonja Petrović =

Sonja Petrović may refer to:

- Sonja Vasić, née Petrović, Serbian basketball player
- Sonja Petrović (statistician), Serbian-American statistician and professor
