= Patrick Corrigan =

Patrick Corrigan may refer to:

- Patrick Corrigan (writer) (1956–2026), American author and advocate for people with mental illness
- Patrick Corrigan (businessman) (born 1932), Australian businessman, art collector and philanthropist
