= Hassan Nagib =

American mechanical and aerospace engineer

Hassan M. Nagib
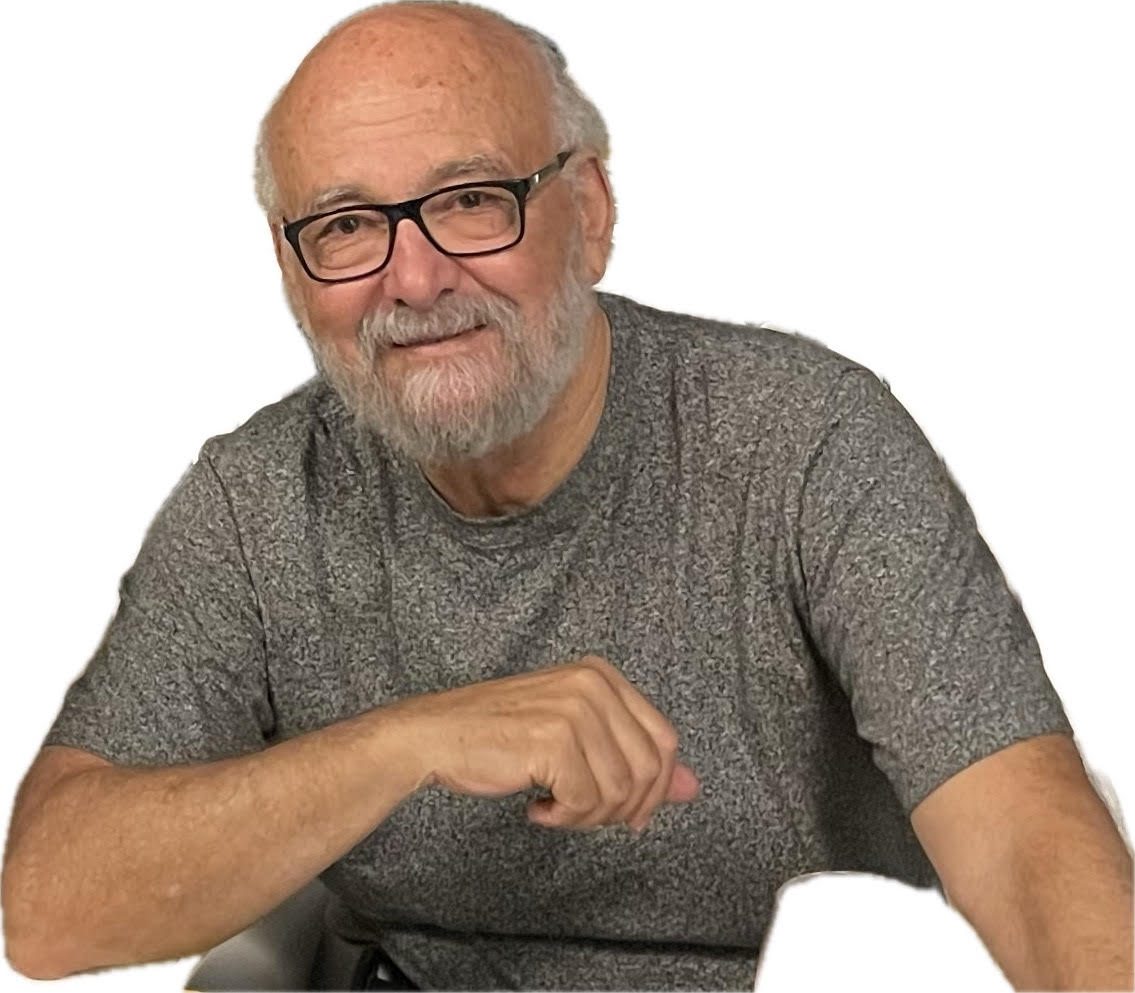
- Occupations: Mechanical engineer, aerospace engineer and academic.
- Awards: NASA Langley Achievement Award, National Aeronautics and Space Administration (1982)

Academic background
- Education: B.S., Mechanical & Aerospace Engineering; M.S., Mechanical & Aerospace Engineering; Ph.D., Mechanical & Aerospace Engineering
- Alma mater: Illinois Institute of Technology

Hassan M. Nagib is a mechanical engineer, aerospace engineer, and academic. He is the John T. Rettaliata Professor of Mechanical and Aerospace Engineering at the Illinois Institute of Technology and was also the Founding Director of the institute's Fluid Dynamics Research Center.

Nagib is most known for his research in fluid mechanics, turbulent flow, and flow management and control. His research encompasses a range of topics, including fundamental aspects of fluids, applied turbulence, hydrodynamic stability and transition, wind engineering, and atmospheric diffusion. He is the recipient of Robert T. Knapp Award, the NASA Langley Achievement Award, and the IIT Professional Achievement Award.

Nagib is a Fellow of the American Physical Society, American Association for the Advancement of Science, the American Institute of Aeronautics and Astronautics, and the American Society of Mechanical Engineers.

== Education ==
Nagib earned his Bachelor of Science in Mechanical and Aerospace Engineering from the Illinois Institute of Technology (IIT). In 1969, he completed his master's degree in the same field and subsequently pursued his doctoral studies, obtaining his Ph.D. in December 1972 from the same institute.

== Career ==
Nagib began his academic career as an instructor at the Illinois Institute of Technology in 1970, a role he held until 1972. Subsequently, he assumed the role of assistant professor in 1973 and continued his career within the institution, holding the position of associate professor from 1975 to 1979, becoming professor in August 1979. He also held the role of Affiliated Professor at the KTH Royal Institute of Technology from 2008 to 2014. Since 1981, he has been serving as the John T. Rettaliata Professor of Mechanical and Aerospace Engineering at IIT.

Nagib served as the department chair and Director for the Fluid Dynamics Research Center (FDRC) from 1978 to 1999. He served as a Chairman of the MAE Department for ten years starting in 1985. Additionally, he took on the roles of Academic Vice President for the Main Campus and Dean of Armour College from 1995 to 1998. An article about his career appeared in the ILLINOIS TECH magazine in the Winter of 2007, 40 years after he relocated to the USA from Egypt, where he was born.

== Research ==
Nagib's research is primarily centered on fluid dynamics, with a specific emphasis on turbulent flows and flow management. He has contributed to the field, publishing numerous papers on topics such as applied turbulence, the mixing of unsteady flows, wind tunnel flow quality, wind engineering and atmospheric diffusion.

=== Turbulence manipulation and channel flow ===
Nagib's research in fluid dynamics has explored turbulent boundary layers and wall-bounded flow behavior. He used flow visualization and hot wire measurements to assess downstream impact on skin friction distribution to explore the effects of introducing a parallel-plate turbulence manipulator into a boundary layer. In collaboration with Jens M. Österlund, Arne V. Johansson and Michael H. Hites, he examined turbulent boundary layer behavior through oil-film interferometry revealing that the parameters under investigation exhibited no significant dependence on Reynolds number, and that the traditionally used values of the von Kármán constant were not supported by their results. In subsequent research, he focused on flat plate turbulent boundary layers in zero-pressure-gradient conditions, shedding light on Reynolds number trends concerning the outer velocity defect and explaining relevant scale relations and asymptotic behavior. By conducting experiments in turbulent pipe and channel flows, he performed a comparative analysis of the von Kármán coefficient (κ) and the wake parameter (Π) in relation to Reynolds number concluding that the Kármán coefficient is not universal. He participated in the development and operation of the Center for International Cooperation in Long Pipe Experiments (CICLoPE) at the University of Bologna, Forli.

In 2009, Nagib's research culminated in the estimation of a wall skin-friction relation, specifically for fully developed turbulent plane-channel flow. This research employed two approaches to derive the relationship. He also conducted research on the challenges within the theory and experimental methods employed in the study of wall-bounded turbulent flows highlighting modern advancements that challenged established conventional wisdom. Additionally, his investigations have encompassed the study of distant wake structures generated by the von Kármán street of vortices shed from a cylinder, with findings indicating that neither the magnitude nor frequency of these vortices significantly alter the remote wake structure. His research with Peter Monkewitz confirmed the non-universality of the von Kármán coefficient explaining that the overlap layer of wall-bounded flow is not a pure logarithmic function but includes a linear term, with a coefficient dependent on the pressure gradient of the flow.

=== Wind tunnel simulation and management for atmospheric boundary layer flows ===
Nagib's research efforts have focused on enhancing wind tunnel design to achieve superior flow quality while minimizing free-stream turbulence, and he has also delved into the utilization of wind tunnel flow for modeling atmospheric boundary layers. His research about the simulation of the neutral atmospheric layers discussed long and short wind tunnel methods highlighting that the atmospheric layers being simulated are not uniform but instead consist of a series of quasi-equilibrium boundary layers that diffuse within older boundary layers. In 1976, he further developed on the technique to generate thick turbulent boundary layers over short distances by introducing significant momentum defects at the wall using upstream-oriented spanwise discrete wall jets in the I.IT. Environmental Wind Tunnel (M. V. Morkovin Wind Tunnel). Furthermore, he and his colleagues employed a vertically oriented wire in wind tunnels to implement the smoke wire technique allowing them the controlled introduction of smoke streaklines with flow visualization.

Nagib investigated methods to eliminate swirls in wind tunnels and duct flows, testing conditions with screens, grids, and honeycombs, highlighting their significance in wind tunnel design and operation. In his research on wind tunnel simulation, he discussed a novel technique for removing sound contamination from low-level pressure signals, enhancing the accuracy of unsteady pressure distribution measurements. Moreover, he extended his studies to transonic wind tunnels by demonstrating boundary-layer transition models showcasing how these concepts could be applied to enhance existing wind tunnels, such as the NASA-Ames 11-foot and the AEDC 16T for improved performance. His activities on wind tunnels culminated in the design, construction, and operation of the National Diagnostic Facility (NDF) at Illinois Institute of Technology.

== Awards and honors ==
- 1972 – The Large Wind Tunnels Working Group of AGARD, Advisory Group of Aerospace Research & Development of NATO
- 1976 – Robert T. Knapp Award, American Society of Mechanical Engineers
- 1982 – NASA Langley Achievement Award, National Aeronautics and Space Administration
- 1995 – Professional Achievement Award, Illinois Institute of Technology

=== Selected articles ===
- Loehrke, R. I., & Nagib, H. M. (1976). Control of free-stream turbulence by means of honeycombs: a balance between suppression and generation. ‘’ J. Fluids Eng.”, 98(3): 342–351.
- Tan-atichat, J., & Nagib, H. M. (1982). Interaction of free-stream turbulence with screens and grids: a balance between turbulence scales. ‘’Journal of Fluid Mechanics” 114, 501–528.
- Cimbala, J. M., Nagib, H. M., & Roshko, A. (1988). Large structure in the far wakes of two-dimensional bluff bodies. ‘’Journal of Fluid Mechanics’’, 967, A15.
- Wark, C. E., & Nagib, H. M. (1991). Experimental investigation of coherent structures in turbulent boundary layers. ‘’Journal of Fluid Mechanics” 230, 183–208.
- Österlund, J. M., Johansson, A. V., Nagib, H. M., & Hites, M. H. (2000). A note on the overlap region in turbulent boundary layers. ‘’Physics of Fluids’’, 12(1), 1-4.
- Zanoun, E. S., Durst, F., & Nagib H. M. (2003) Evaluating the law of the wall in two-dimensional fully developed turbulent channel flows. ‘’Physics of fluids”, 15 (10), 3079–3089.
- Nagib, H. M., Chauhan, K. A., & Monkewitz, P. A. (2007). Approach to an asymptotic state for zero pressure gradient turbulent boundary layers. ‘’Philosophical Transactions of the Royal Society A: Mathematical, Physical and Engineering Sciences’’, 365(1852), 755-770.
- Monkewitz, P. A., Chauhan, K. A., & Nagib, H. M. (2007). Self-consistent high-Reynolds-number asymptotics for zero-pressure-gradient turbulent boundary layers. ‘’Physics of Fluids” 19 (11).
- Nagib, H. M., & Chauhan, K. A. (2008). Variations of von Kármán coefficient in canonical flows. ‘’Physics of fluids’’, 20(10).
- Chauhan, K. A., Monkewitz, P. A., & Nagib, H. M. (2009). Criteria for assessing experiments in zero pressure gradient boundary layers. ‘’Fluid Dynamics Research’’, 41(2), 021404.
- Marusic, I., McKeon, B. J., Monkewitz, P. A., Nagib, H. M., Smits, A. J., & Sreenivasan, K. R. (2010). Wall-bounded turbulent flows at high Reynolds numbers: Recent advances and key issues. ‘’Physics of fluids’’, 22(6).
- Monkewitz, P. A., & Nagib, H. M., (2023). The hunt for the Kármán ‘constant’ revisited. ’’Journal of Fluid Mechanics’’, 190, 265–298.
- Baxerres, V., Vinuesa, R., & Nagib, H., (2023). Evidence of quasi equilibrium in pressure-gradient turbulent boundary layers. "arXiv:2311.11675v1 [physics.flu-dyn]".
