= Department of Physics (Illinois Institute of Technology) =

The Department of Physics is an academic department at the Lewis College of Science and Letters at the Illinois Institute of Technology in Chicago, Illinois, United States.

It offers undergraduate academic programs including B.S. in physics, applied physics, and physics education and graduate programs in physics and health physics. Many notable physicists have both taught and studied at IIT including Nobel Prize for Physics laureates Leon M. Lederman and Jack Steinberger.

== Academics ==
=== Undergraduate academics ===
Bachelor of Science degrees are given in: Applied Physics, Astrophysics, Physics, and Physics Education. There are also Co-terminal Bachelor of Science degree programs in Physics/Master of Science in Physics and in Physics/Master of Health Physics.

=== Graduate academics ===
Master's degrees are given in: Health Physics, Applied Physics, and Physics. The Doctor of Philosophy degree in Physics is also offered.

== Current research ==
Current research includes:

- Involvement in the Double Chooz collaboration. The experiment is intended to measure the θ_{13} neutrino mixing angle.
- The MINOS experiment at Fermilab which studies neutrino oscillations.
- The Daya Bay Reactor Neutrino Experiment. The experiment performed a precision measurement of the θ_{13} neutrino mixing angle.
- The MicroBooNE experiment. A short baseline accelerator neutrino experiment for the development of LAr technologies. Plan to study the MiniBooNE low-energy excess and perform cross section measurements of neutrino interactions in LAr.
- The PROSPECT experiment. A short baseline reactor antineutrino experiment searching for evidence of sterile neutrinos and a precision measurement of the U235 spectrum.
- International Muon Ionization Cooling Experiment

== History ==
Faculty timeline

== Notable people ==
Leon M. Lederman, winner of the 1988 Nobel Prize for Physics, discoverer of the bottom quark, and Director Emeritus of Fermilab was a professor at IIT.

Robert F. Christy taught at IIT before going on to be a part of the Manhattan Project. His insights greatly simplified the design of a plutonium based warhead; the solid-core plutonium model is often referred to as the "Christy gadget".

Lee De Forest, one of "the fathers of the electronic age" and the man who brought sound to motion pictures was an IIT physics faculty member.

The world's first radio astronomer, Grote Reber, is an IIT alum.

Watts Humphrey, "Father of software quality", earned a master's degree in physics from IIT.

Jack Steinberger studied at IIT before dropping out to support his family. He later won the 1988 Nobel Prize for Physics.

Sidney Coleman, best known for his contributions to quantum field theory, received his B.S. from IIT. Nobel laureate Sheldon Glashow says of Coleman, ""He's not a Stephen Hawking; he has virtually no visibility outside. But within the community of theoretical physicists, he's kind of a major god. He is the physicist's physicist."

Raymond A. Serway, author of several undergraduate physics textbooks, received his doctorate from the Illinois Institute of Technology.
