= Central Welfare Council =

- Rada Główna Opiekuńcza
- Formation: 1916
- Location: Warsaw, Occupied Poland
- Chairman: Adam Ronikier (1940-1943); Konstanty Tchórznicki (1943-1945)

The Central Welfare Council (sometimes also translated as Main Social Services Council--Polish, Rada Główna Opiekuńcza) was one of the very few Polish social organizations that were allowed to work under the German occupation of Poland in World War I and World War II.

== History ==
It was created during World War I in 1916. By 1918, the RGO had 125,000 children and youth in its care. It moved 11,000 children from Polish cities to families in the countryside between 1915 and 1920.

The organization was re-created in February 1940 in Krakow. The RGO was meant to represent Polish voluntary welfare organizations in the General Government (German-occupied Poland). It was headquartered in Warsaw during World War II, but had its departments in most of Polish towns and cities.

The RGO had connections to the Polish resistance, and although it was supervised by the occupying German authorities, it did not cooperate with them.

The RGO organized a field kitchen outside of the transit camp Durchgangslager 121 following its establishment in 1944. Mathematician Josephine Janina Mehlberg worked with the RGO, bringing food and other supplies to Majdanek concentration camp and negotiating the release of Polish prisoners.

=== Organisation ===
The RGO aided one million people in 1941; in the fall of 1944, 1.2 million people received aid from the organization. The council was chaired by count Adam Ronikier (February 1940-October 1943) and Konstanty Tchórznicki (until April 1945). The council had at least 15,000 volunteers all around Poland.

The council received finances from the German authorities and (clandestinely) from the Polish Government in Exile.

== Activity ==
Among its main tasks were organization of:

- Cheap bars with hot soup for the poor and the expelled; almost 2000 such facilities were opened for almost 300,000 people
- Shelters and hostels for displaced persons and the poor
- Holiday camps for children as well as rest-homes for children and elderly people
- Places of free exchange of clothing and food as well as providing the poor with garments; up to 300,000 people a year were offered warm clothing
- Educational facilities and trade schools (other schools were forbidden)
- Relief for the expelled from Polish areas annexed by Germany, Zamość area, Volhynia and residents of Warsaw during and after the Warsaw Uprising
- Sending food packages for the POWs and prisoners of German concentration camps
