= John F. O. Bilson =

Australian economist

John F.O. Bilson (born 1948) is a Professor of Finance and Director of the MS and Ph.D. Programs of Finance at the Illinois Institute of Technology, in Chicago. Bilson grew up in Melbourne, Australia where he attended Melbourne Grammar School. He went on to receive a Master of Economics and a Bachelor of Economics (Hons.) from Monash University, Melbourne, Australia. Bilson received his Ph.D. in International Economics from the University of Chicago in 1973.

In 2003, Bilson completed two years at the Melbourne Business School where he served as a professorial fellow. Prior to this appointment, he was the Director of the Financial Management Program at the IIT Stuart School of Business. Before joining the Stuart School, Bilson was a senior vice president at The Chicago Corporation where he established the financial futures trading group, TCC Futures Management. Other appointments include president of BetaSoft Management and vice-president of Trading Development Corporation.

As one of four scholars invited to speak at the European Summer School in Econometrics in Bologna, Italy in June 1999, Bilson presented one week of lectures about investment, trading, and risk management. The conference, sponsored by the Inter-University Center for Econometrics, invited doctoral students at European universities to learn about current research in financial econometrics from top US faculty members.

Bilson has presented various seminars, covering topics such as "Parsimonious Value at Risk for Fixed Income Portfolios," at the University of Venice, "The Non-Linear Dynamics of the Exchange Rate," at the Center for International Monetary and Banking Studies in Geneva, Switzerland, and "Value at Risk Models," in New York City.

Additional appointments include Northwestern University, the University of Chicago, Stanford Graduate School of Business, the Hoover Institution on War, Revolution, and Peace. He served as a member of the research department of the International Monetary Fund and later as a research associate of the National Bureau of Economic Research.

Bilson is the editor (with Richard C. Marston) of Exchange Rate Theory and Practice (1984, University of Chicago Press). He has published over thirty articles in the areas of international finance, international economics, and risk management.
