= Nambury S. Raju =

American psychology professor

Nambury S. Raju (1937 – October 27, 2005) was an American psychology professor known for his work in psychometrics, meta-analysis, and utility theory. He was a Fellow of the Society of Industrial Organizational Psychology.

== Professional biography ==
At the time of his death, Raju was a Distinguished Professor in the Institute of Psychology at Illinois Institute of Technology (IIT) in Chicago, Illinois. Raju worked at Science Research Associates (SRA) from 1961 to 1978, specializing in psychometrics and test validation. His first published article, A new working formula for the split-half reliability model appeared in Educational and Psychological Measurement in 1965 and was published with Isaiah Guttman, a colleague from SRA. He received his PhD from IIT in 1974, and in 1978 he joined the psychology faculty at IIT, eventually reaching the rank of Full Professor. In 1993 he left IIT for Georgia Tech, but he returned to IIT in 1996 as a Distinguished Professor. Over the course of his career, Raju authored over 150 publications and presentations and was editor or reviewer for more than 24 professional journals and served on the United States Department of Defense Advisory Committee on Military Personnel Testing from 1989 to 1992. Shortly before his death, Raju served on a National Academy of Sciences Committee to evaluate the National Assessment of Educational Progress (NAEP).

== Scholarship ==
Raju contributed to the literature on personnel selection (especially validation and utility), psychometrics (especially in the areas of reliability and differential item functioning), and validity generalization/meta-analysis.

Raju was a SIOP Fellow, but he was also a member of seven other professional organizations including APA and NCME. He received the Distinguished Career Award from the Academy of Management's Research Method Division posthumously for his many contributions to research methodology.

== Publications ==
=== Journal articles ===
- Guttman, I., & Raju, N. S. (1965). A minimum loss function as determiner of optimal cutting scores. Personnel Psychology, 18(2), 179-185.
- Raju, N. S., & Guttman, I. (1965). A new working formula for the split-half reliability model. Educational and Psychological Measurement, 25(4), 963-967.
- Raju, N. S., & Guttman, I. (1965). Correlation as a function of predictor score points. Educational and Psychological Measurement, 25(3), 655-657.
- Raju, N. S. (1970). New formula for estimating total test reliability from parts of unequal lengths. Proceedings of the Annual Convention of the American Psychological Association, 5(Pt. 1), 143-144.
- Raju, N. S. (1977). A generalization of coefficient alpha. Psychometrika, 42(4), 549-565.
- Raju, N. S. (1977). On estimating test variance in multiple matrix sampling. Educational and Psychological Measurement, 37(3), 621-625.
- Raju, N. S. (1979). Note on two generalizations of coefficient alpha. Psychometrika, 44(3), 347-349.
- Raju, N. S. (1982). On test homogeneity and maximum KR-20. Educational and Psychological Measurement, 42(1), 145-152.
- Raju, N. S. (1982). The reliability of a criterion-referenced composite with the parts of the composite having different cutting scores. Educational and Psychological Measurement, 42(1), 113-129.
- Cotter, K. L., & Raju, N. S. (1982). An evaluation of formula-based population squared cross-validity estimates and factor score estimates in prediction. Educational and Psychological Measurement, 42(2), 493-519.
- Devine, P. J., & Raju, N. S. (1982). Extent of overlap among four item bias methods. Educational and Psychological Measurement, 42(4), 1049-1066.
- Fralicx, R. D., & Raju, N. S. (1982). A comparison of five methods for combining multiple criteria into a single composite. Educational and Psychological Measurement, 42(3), 823-827.
- Raju, N. S. (1983). Obtaining the squared multiple correlations from a singular correlation matrix. Educational and Psychological Measurement, 43(1), 127-130.
- Raju, N. S., & Burke, M. J. (1983). Two new procedures for studying validity generalization. Journal of Applied Psychology, 68(3), 382-395.
- Raju, N. S., & Burke, M. J. (1984). Correction to raju and burke. Journal of Applied Psychology, 69(4), 588.
- Raju, N. S., & Edwards, J. E. (1984). Note on "adverse impact from a psychometric perspective".. Journal of Applied Psychology, 69(1), 191-193.
- Raju, N. S., Edwards, J. E., & LoVerde, M. A. (1985). Corrected formulas for computing sample sizes under indirect range restriction. Journal of Applied Psychology, 70(3), 565-566.
- Raju, N. S., & Normand, J. (1985). The regression bias method: A unified approach for detecting item bias and selection bias. Educational and Psychological Measurement, 45(1), 37-54.
- Raju, N. S., Fralicx, R., & Steinhaus, S. D. (1986). Covariance and regression slope models for studying validity generalization. Applied Psychological Measurement, 10(2), 195-211.
- Goldman, S. H., & Raju, N. S. (1986). Recovery of one- and two-parameter logistic item parameters: An empirical study. Educational and Psychological Measurement, 46(1), 11-21.
- Burke, M. J., Raju, N. S., & Pearlman, K. (1986). An empirical comparison of the results of five validity generalization procedures. Journal of Applied Psychology, 71(2), 349-353.
- Burke, M. J., Normand, J., & Raju, N. S. (1987). Examinee attitudes toward computer-administered ability testing. Computers in Human Behavior, 3(2), 95-107.
- Schmidt, F. L., Hunter, J. E., & Raju, N. S. (1988). Validity generalization and situational specificity: A second look at the 75% rule and fisher's z transformation. Journal of Applied Psychology, 73(4), 665-672.
- Ziering, B. A., & Raju, N. S. (1988). Development and validation of a job family specific position analysis questionnaire. Journal of Business and Psychology, 2(3), 228-238.
- Raju, N. S. (1988). The area between two item characteristic curves. Psychometrika, 53(4), 495-502.
- Neuman, G. A., Edwards, J. E., & Raju, N. S. (1989). Organizational development interventions: A meta-analysis of their effects on satisfaction and other attitudes. Personnel Psychology, 42(3), 461-489.
- Raju, N. S., Pappas, S., & Williams, C. P. (1989). An empirical monte carlo test of the accuracy of the correlation, covariance, and regression slope models for assessing validity generalization. Journal of Applied Psychology, 74(6), 901-911.
- Raju, N. S., Burke, M. J., & Normand, J. (1990). A new approach for utility analysis. Journal of Applied Psychology, 75(1), 3-12.
- Raju, N. S. (1990). Determining the significance of estimated signed and unsigned areas between two item response functions. Applied Psychological Measurement, 14(2), 197-207.
- Raju, N. S., Steinhaus, S. D., Edwards, J. E., & DeLessio, J. (1991). A logistic regression model for personnel selection. Applied Psychological Measurement, 15(2), 139-152.
- Raju, N. S. (1991). "Determining the significance of estimated signed and unsigned areas between two item response functions": Correction. Applied Psychological Measurement, 15(4), 352.
- Raju, N. S., Burke, M. J., Normand, J., & Langlois, G. M. (1991). A new meta-analytic approach. Journal of Applied Psychology, 76(3), 432-446.
- Martin, S. L., & Raju, N. S. (1992). Determining cutoff scores that optimize utility: A recognition of recruiting costs. Journal of Applied Psychology, 77(1), 15-23.
- Raju, N. S., Burke, M. J., Normand, J., & Lezotte, D. V. (1993). What would be if what is wasn't? rejoinder to judiesch, schmidt, and hunter (1993). Journal of Applied Psychology, 78(6), 912-916.
- Raju, N. S., Drasgow, F., & Slinde, J. A. (1993). An empirical comparison of the area methods, lord's chi-square test, and the mantel-haenszel technique for assessing differential item functioning. Educational and Psychological Measurement, 53(2), 301-314.
- Raju, N. S., Burke, M. J., & Maurer, T. J. (1995). A note on direct range restriction corrections in utility analysis. Personnel Psychology, 48(1), 143-149.
- Budgell, G. R., Raju, N. S., & Quartetti, D. A. (1995). Analysis of differential item functioning in translated assessment instruments. Applied Psychological Measurement, 19(4), 309-321.
- Raju, N. S., van der Linden, Wim J., & Fleer, P. F. (1995). IRT-based internal measures of differential functioning of items and tests. Applied Psychological Measurement, 19(4), 353-368.
- Oshima, T. C., Raju, N. S., & Flowers, C. P. (1997). Development and demonstration of multidimensional IRT-based internal measures of differential functioning of items and tests. Journal of Educational Measurement, 34(3), 253-272.
- Raju, N. S., Bilgic, R., Edwards, J. E., & Fleer, P. F. (1997). Methodology review: Estimation of population validity and cross-validity, and the use of equal weights in prediction. Applied Psychological Measurement, 21(4), 291-305.
- Oshima, T. C., Raju, N. S., Flowers, C. P., & Slinde, J. A. (1998). Differential bundle functioning using the DFIT framework: Procedures for identifying possible sources of differential functioning. Applied Measurement in Education, 11(4), 353-369.
- Maurer, T. J., Raju, N. S., & Collins, W. C. (1998). Peer and subordinate performance appraisal measurement equivalence. Journal of Applied Psychology, 83(5), 693-702.
- Raju, N. S., Anselmi, T. V., Goodman, J. S., & Thomas, A. (1998). The effect if correlated artifacts and true validity on the accuracy of parameter estimation in validity generalization. Personnel Psychology, 51(2), 453-465.
- Raju, N. S., Bilgic, R., Edwards, J. E., & Fleer, P. F. (1999). Accuracy of population validity and cross-validity estimation: An empirical comparison of formula-based, traditional empirical, and equal weights procedures. Applied Psychological Measurement, 23(2), 99-115.
- Flowers, C. P., Oshima, T. C., & Raju, N. S. (1999). A description and demonstration of the polytomous-DFIT framework. Applied Psychological Measurement, 23(4), 309-326.
- Collins, W. C., Raju, N. S., & Edwards, J. E. (2000). Assessing differential functioning in a satisfaction scale. Journal of Applied Psychology, 85(3), 451-461.
- Cabrera, E. F., & Raju, N. S. (2001). Utility analysis: Current trends and future directions. International Journal of Selection and Assessment, 9(1-2), 92-102.
- Raju, N. S., Laffitte, L. J., & Byrne, B. M. (2002). Measurement equivalence: A comparison of methods based on confirmatory factor analysis and item response theory. Journal of Applied Psychology, 87(3), 517-529.
- Barr, M. A., & Raju, N. S. (2003). IRT-based assessments of rater effects in multiple-source feedback instruments. Organizational Research Methods, 6(1), 15-43.
- Raju, N. S., & Brand, P. A. (2003). Determining the significance of correlations corrected for unreliability and range restriction. Applied Psychological Measurement, 27(1), 52-71.
- Clemans, W. V., Lunneborg, C. E., & Raju, N. S. (2004). Professor paul horst's legacy: A differential prediction model for effective guidance in course selection. Educational Measurement: Issues and Practice, 23(3), 23-30.
- Miner, J. B., & Raju, N. S. (2004). Risk propensity differences between managers and entrepreneurs and between low- and high-growth entrepreneurs: A reply in a more conservative vein. Journal of Applied Psychology, 89(1), 3-13.
- Thomas, A., & Raju, N. S. (2004). An evaluation of James et al.'s (1992) VG estimation procedure when artifacts and true validity are correlated. International Journal of Selection and Assessment, 12(4), 299-311.
- Raju, N. S., & Oshima, T. C. (2005). Two prophecy formulas for assessing the reliability of item response theory-based ability estimates. Educational and Psychological Measurement, 65(3), 361-375.
- Henry, M. S., & Raju, N. S. (2006). The effects of trailed and situational impression management on a personality test: An empirical analysis. Psychology Science. Special Issue: Considering response distortion in personality measurement for industrial, work and organizational psychology research and practice, 48(3), 247-267.
- Oshima, T. C., Raju, N. S., & Nanda, A. O. (2006). A new method for assessing the statistical significance in the differential functioning of items and tests (DFIT) framework. Journal of Educational Measurement, 43(1), 1-17.
- Price, L. R., Raju, N., Lurie, A., Wilkins, C., & Zhu, J. (2006). Conditional standard errors of measurement for composite scores on the wechsler preschool and primary scale of intelligence-third edition. Psychological Reports, 98(1), 237-252.
- Raju, N. S., Lezotte, D. V., Fearing, B. K., & Oshima, T. C. (2006). A note on correlations corrected for unreliability and range restriction. Applied Psychological Measurement, 30(2), 145-149.
- Raju, N. S., Price, L. R., Oshima, T. C., & Nering, M. L. (2007). Standardized conditional SEM: A case for conditional reliability. Applied Psychological Measurement, 31(3), 169-180.
- Schmidt, F. L., & Raju, N. S. (2007). Updating meta-analytic research findings: Bayesian approaches versus the medical model. Journal of Applied Psychology, 92(2), 297-308.
- McCarty, F. A., Oshima, T. C., & Raju, N. S. (2007). Identifying possible sources of differential functioning using differential bundle functioning with polytomously scored data. Applied Measurement in Education, 20(2), 205-225.
