= Josephine Janina Mehlberg =

Polish-American Jewish mathematician

- Born: Pepi Spinner; 1905; Zhuravno
- Died: 1969 (aged 63–64)
- Other names: Janina Spinner Mehlberg; Janina Suchodolska
- Education: University of Lwów (DPhil, 1928)

Josephine Janina Mehlberg (1905–1969) was a Polish-American Jewish mathematician. Using the fictional identity of Countess Janina Suchodolska, she helped thousands of people avoid death at the Majdanek concentration camp during World War II.

== Life ==
Mehlberg was born Pepi Spinner in Zhuravno, now part of Ukraine. Her father was a wealthy landowner who often socialized with Polish nobles. She had a happy childhood until World War I, when her father was abducted by Russian forces; he died in 1918.

Mehlberg earned her D.Phil. under the supervision of Kazimierz Twardowski from the University of Lwów (now Lviv) in 1928. She married fellow Jewish philosopher Henry Mehlberg in 1933, and at some point afterwards went by the name Janina Spinner Mehlberg. The two lived in Lwów, where Henry worked as a professor and Janina taught at a girls' school.

In 1939, the Nazis invaded Poland, but the city was under Soviet control until 1941, at which point Nazi officials began moving the city's Jews into a ghetto. In response, the Mehlbergs fled to Lublin. There, the two received forged identity documents from Count Andrzej Skrzynski, a friend of Josephine's father. Under her new pseudonym of Countess Janina Suchodolska, Mehlberg began working with the Polish Main Welfare Council (known by the Polish acronym RGO); through them, she began working to bring supplies into the Majdanek concentration camp and to gather information for the Polish resistance. Mehlberg would argue with camp officials, convincing them to accept food, medicine, and clothing for prisoners under the supposition that it would allow for more prisoners to labor for the Nazis. She also negotiated the release of prisoners unable to work, who were transferred to the care of the RGO; biographers White and Sliwa say that Mehlberg negotiated the release of 9,707 Polish prisoners, 4,431 of whom were from Majdanek. Mehlberg was not able to aid Jewish prisoners due to the restraints of the RGO. Within the RGO, she also kept her Jewish identity secret for the duration of the war.

After World War II, the Mehlbergs immigrated to the United States, settling in Chicago. She began teaching mathematics as a professor at the Illinois Institute of Technology, where she had two PhD students. Although not religious, both Janina and Henry participated in Jewish community events in Chicago.

== Legacy ==
Late in her life, she wrote a memoir of her life during World War II; it was not published before her death in 1969. Her husband translated the manuscript into English and unsuccessfully sought to publish it. The manuscript was passed on to history professor Arthur Funk, and then to historian Elizabeth B. White, who used the manuscript as the foundation of her biography of Mehlberg, co-authored with historian Joanna Sliwa. The biography was published in 2024 under the title The Counterfeit Countess.
