= Martha Evens =

American computer scientist (born 1935)

- Born: Martha Walton; January 1, 1935 (age 91); Boston, Massachusetts, US
- Education: Bryn Mawr College, B.S., Mathematics 1955; Radcliffe, M.S., Mathematics, 1957; Northwestern University, Ph.D. degree in computer science, 1975
- Known for: Intelligent tutoring systems
- Scientific career
- Workplaces: Illinois Institute of Technology
- Thesis: Semantic representations for question-answering systems (1975)
- Doctoral advisor: Gilbert Krulee
- Website: www.cs.iit.edu/~martha/

Martha Walton Evens (born 1935) is an emeritus professor at the Illinois Institute of Technology. She worked on the first spelling correction program at MIT Lincoln Laboratory in the late 1950s. Evens was president of the Association for Computational Linguistics in 1984.

== Biography ==
Evens graduated summa cum laude from Bryn Mawr College in 1955 with a major in mathematics, having taken many courses in Greek. She shared the European Fellowship (with Nancy Degenhardt, Greek major). Evens was president of the classics club and played field hockey and basketball.

After finishing her studies at Bryn Mawr, she received a Fulbright Fellowship to study at the University of Paris. Her first interaction with a computer was in the summer of 1957 when she received her M.A. in mathematics from Radcliffe College and was hired as a "Mathematician" by Oliver Selfridge at the MIT Lincoln Laboratory. That computer was an IBM 709, which became a 7090 when Evens went back to Lincoln Laboratory in the summer of 1958. She took a class in the FORTRAN II programming language, which used the first FORTRAN compiler shipped by IBM in 1958.

Evens completed her Ph.D. under the supervision of Gilbert Krulee in computer science from Northwestern University in 1975. Subsequently, she became a member of the Computer Science faculty at Illinois Institute of Technology (IIT), where she remained. During her career at IIT, Evens served as advisor or co-advisor for over 100 PhD students.

"I also drove the two boxes of cards containing the first Lisp Interpreter from MIT to Lincoln Lab as a favor to a friend - and only later realized what a big part Lisp was to play in my life and work," Dr. Evens said.

According to IIT, Evens is still active. "Over the years, Evens has been a champion of computer science and computer science students. In 1980, she chaired the Chicago Chapter of Computer Machinery and in 1984 she was president of the Association for Computational Linguistics. Evens still enjoys refereeing papers for several journals."

At the age of 87, Evens was honored by the Association for Computational Linguistics (ACL) with its Lifetime Achievement Award in May 2022, which described Evens as a “path blazer.” The award honors individuals whose work is widely recognized as having provided "sustained and enduring contributions to the field of computational linguistics over a long period." Evens received the award during the ACL’s 60th annual meeting in Dublin on May 25, 2022. Evens said she was taken completely by surprise.

== Tribute ==
The annual Martha Evens Distinguished Lecture Series in Computer Science was established by her students and colleagues at IIT. Speakers are computer scientists of international whose contributions have broad impact both within and beyond the bounds of the discipline. The 2023 speaker was Bonnie J. Dorr.

== Personal life ==
Martha was married to Leonard Evens, a mathematics professor, from 1958 until his death in 2020. She has three children and five grandchildren.

== Books ==
- Evens, Martha W.; Michael, Joel (2006). One-on-One Tutoring by Humans and Computers. Lawrence Earlbaum Associates. ISBN 9780805843606.
- Evens, Martha W. (1988). Relational Models of the Lexicon : Representing Knowledge in Semantic Networks. Cambridge University Press. ISBN 9780521363006.
- Evens, Martha W. (1980). Lexical-Semantic Relations : a Comparative Survey. Carbondale, IL: Linguistic Research. ISBN 9780887830365.
- Evens, Martha W.; McElwain, C. K.; Van Hoosen, F. (1960). Machine Correction of Garbled English Text (Report). Group Report. Vol. 54G-0022. MIT Lincoln Lab. OCLC 15247397.
