= Patrick Corrigan (writer) =

American psychologist and author (1956–2026)

Patrick W. Corrigan (April 19, 1956 – January 11, 2026) was an American author, psychologist and advocate for people with a mental illness, particularly in relation to the issue of stigma. He wrote more than 15 books and 400 peer reviewed articles specializing in issues related to the mental illness stigmas. Corrigan suffered from mental illness himself and is most likely the reason his research had this focus.

== Professional life ==
From 1992, Corrigan was on the faculty at the University of Chicago and also served as an investigator for the Chicago Consortium for Stigma Research. He was later a distinguished professor of psychology and Associate Dean at Illinois Institute of Technology, where he received his doctorate in psychology.

In 1998, Corrigan was added to the Who's Who of the World. One of his most noted books is "Don't Call Me Nuts : Coping with the Stigma of Mental Illness", which discusses many issues relating to mental illness including the issue of indiscriminate disclosure. More recently, he has edited "On the Stigma of Mental Illness: Practical strategies for research and social change" which illustrated perspectives from a wide variety of sources, including people with a mental illness, to look at practical affirmative action tactics that can be used to fight against stigma.

== Published work and research ==
Corrigan's writing focused around the public stigma of mental illness. His research shows ways to overcome and educate others on the effects stigmas have on the mental illness community. Majority of his work highlights the importance of community, and personal contact within the recovery stages. Corrigan allows his work to be unbiased and includes many different ways to help deter stigmas including religion and faith based practices. His research allows readers to see different correlations and comparisons within the topic, such as racial and suicide attempt survivor stigmas. Corrigan notes that the idea of color blindness can transfer to mental illness and has the same effect on the population. His work also references how a prognosis can be detrimental to a patient in a way were they are held to the same stigmas of their newly named illness.

== Personal life and death ==
Corrigan later resided in Northern Illinois. He died at his home in Glenview, Illinois, on January 11, 2026, at the age of 69.

== Publications ==
The following is a list of published books.

1. Principles and Practice of Psychiatric Rehabilitation : An Empirical Approach
2. Challenging the Stigma of Mental Illness : Lessons for Therapists and Advocates
3. The Stigma of Disease and Disability : Understanding Causes and Overcoming Injustices
4. Interactive Staff Training : Rehabilitation Teams that Work
5. Health and Wellness in People Living With Serious Mental Illness
6. Person-Centered Care for Mental Illness : The Evolution of Adherence and Self-Determination
7. Principles and Practice of Psychiatric Rehabilitation, First Edition : An Empirical Approach
8. The Power of Peer Providers in Mental Health Services
9. Cognitive Rehabilitation for Neuropsychiatric Disorders
10. On the Stigma of Mental Illness : Practical Strategies for Research and Social Change
11. Don't Call Me Nuts! : Coping with the Stigma of Mental Illness
12. Practice Guidelines for Extended Psychiatric Residential Care : From Chaos to Collaboration
13. Social Cognition and Schizophrenia
