= Illinois Institute of Technology =

Private university in Chicago, Illinois, U.S.

- Former names: Armour Institute (1890–1940); Lewis Institute (1895–1940)
- Motto: Transforming Lives. Inventing the Future.
- Type: Private research university
- Established: 1890; 136 years ago (first predecessor); April 23, 1940; 86 years ago (merged school)
- Accreditation: HLC
- Academic affiliations: AITU; NAICU; ORAU; URA; Space-grant
- Endowment: $255 million (2023)
- President: Raj Echambadi
- Provost: Elizabeth Hudson
- Faculty: 659
- Students: 8,834 (fall 2024)
- Undergraduates: 3,135 (fall 2024)
- Postgraduates: 5,699 (fall 2024)
- Location: Chicago, Illinois, United States; 41°50′6″N 87°37′39″W
- Campus: 120 acres (48.6 ha); Large city
- Newspaper: TechNews
- Colors: Red, gray, and black
- Nickname: Scarlet Hawks
- Sporting affiliations: NCAA Division III — NACC
- Mascot: Talon the Hawk
- Website: iit.edu

The Illinois Institute of Technology (Illinois Tech or IIT) is a private research university in Chicago, Illinois, United States. Tracing its history to 1890, the present name was adopted upon the merger of the Armour Institute and Lewis Institute in 1940. The university has programs in architecture, business, communications, design, engineering, industrial technology, information technology, law, psychology, and science. It is classified among "R2: Doctoral Universities – High research activity".

The university's historic roots are in several 19th-century engineering and professional education institutions in the United States. In the mid 20th century, it became closely associated with trends in modernist architecture through the work of its Dean of Architecture Ludwig Mies van der Rohe, who designed its campus. The Institute of Design, Chicago-Kent College of Law, and Midwest College of Engineering were also merged into Illinois Tech.

== History ==
=== The Sermon and The Institute ===
In 1890, when advanced education was often reserved for society's elite, Chicago minister Frank Wakely Gunsaulus delivered what came to be known as the "Million Dollar Sermon". From the pulpit of his South Side church, near the site Illinois Institute of Technology now occupies, Gunsaulus said that with a million dollars he could build a school where students could learn to think in practical, not theoretical terms—where they could be taught to "learn by doing".

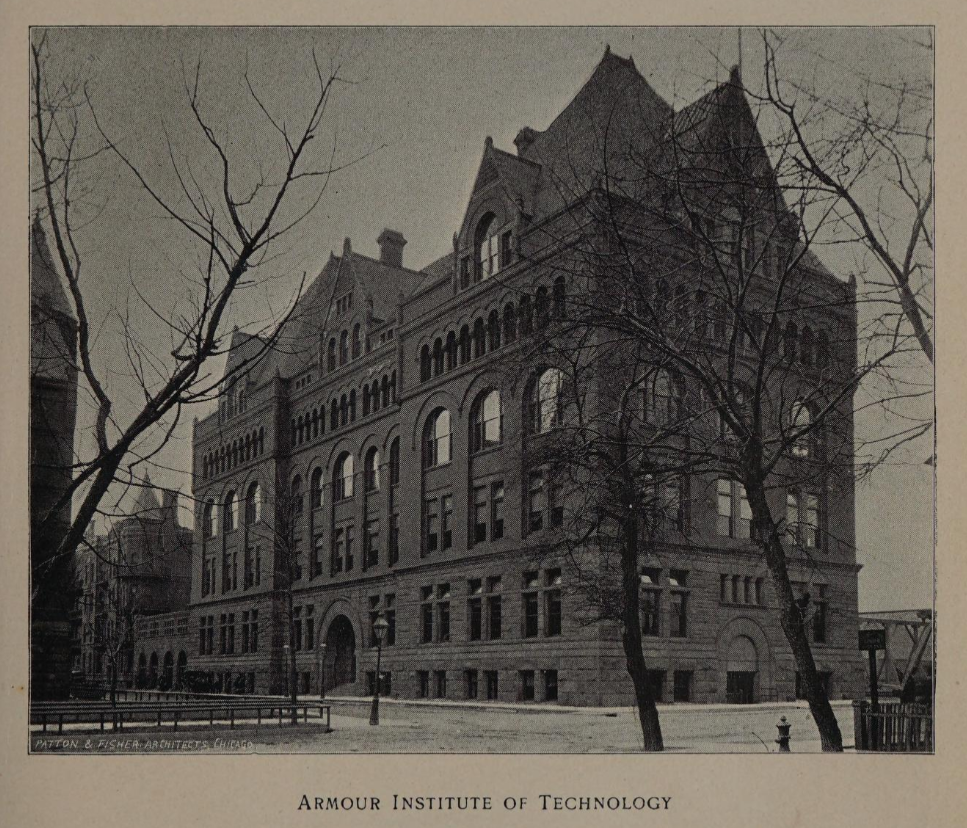
The Main Building at the Armour Institute of Technology in 1898.

Inspired by Gunsaulus, Philip Danforth Armour, Sr. gave $1 million to found the Armour Institute—and Armour, his wife, Malvina Belle Ogden Armour, and their son J. Ogden Armour continued to support the university in its early years. Armour said it was his best-paying investment. When Armour Institute opened in 1893, it offered professional courses in engineering, chemistry, architecture and library science.

Illinois Tech was created in 1940 by the merger of Armour Institute and Lewis Institute. Lewis Institute, on Chicago's west side, was established in 1895 by the estate of hardware merchant and investor Allen Cleveland Lewis, and offered liberal arts, science, and engineering courses for both men and women. At separate meetings held by their respective boards on October 26, 1939, the trustees of Armour and Lewis voted to merge the two colleges. An April 23, 1940 Cook County circuit court decision solidified the merger.

=== Mergers and changes ===
The Institute of Design (ID), founded in Chicago by László Moholy-Nagy in 1937, merged with Illinois Tech in 1949.

Chicago-Kent College of Law, founded in 1887, became part of the university in 1969, making Illinois Institute of Technology one of the few technology-based universities with a law school.

Also in 1969, the Stuart School of Management and Finance—now known as the Stuart School of Business—was established thanks to a gift from the estate of Lewis Institute alumnus and Chicago financier Harold Leonard Stuart. The program became the Stuart School of Business in 1999.

The Midwest College of Engineering, founded in 1967, joined the university in 1986, giving Illinois Tech a presence in west suburban Wheaton with what is now called the Rice Campus.

In 2006, the University Technology Park at Illinois Institute of Technology, an incubator and life sciences/tech start-up facility, was started in research buildings on the south end of Mies Campus. As of April 2014, University Tech Park at Illinois Institute of Technology is home to many companies.

Illinois Tech is a private, PhD-granting university with programs in engineering, science, human sciences, applied technology, architecture, business, design, and law. It is one of 23 institutions in the Association of Independent Technological Universities (AITU).

=== Growth and expansion ===
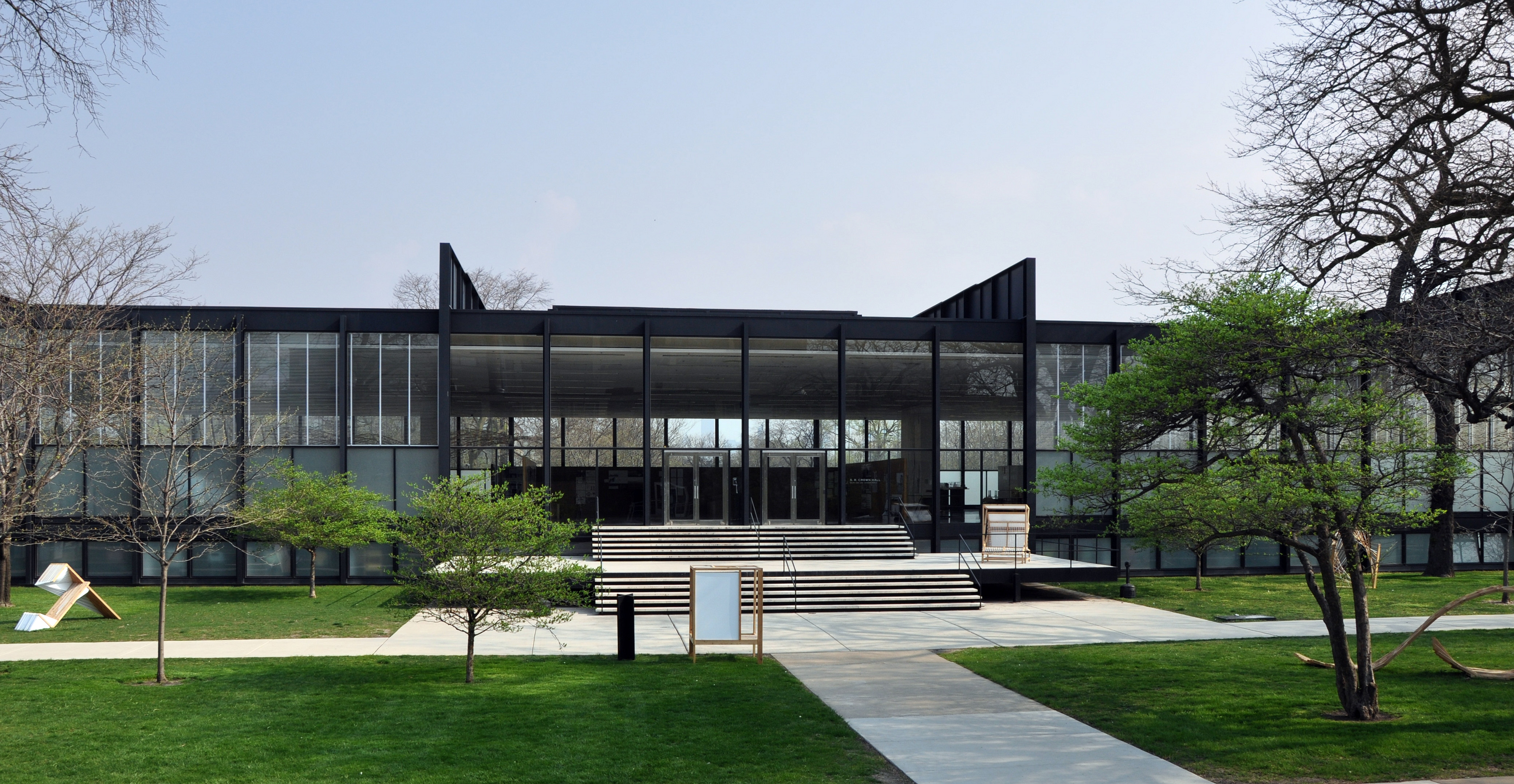
S. R. Crown Hall on the Illinois Institute of Technology campus. Designed by Ludwig Mies van der Rohe in 1956, it was designated a National Historic Landmark in 2001.

Illinois Tech continued to expand after the merger. As one of the first American universities to host a Navy V-12 program during World War II the school saw a large increase in students and expanded the Armour campus beyond its original 7 acres (2.83 ha). Two years before the merger, German architect Ludwig Mies van der Rohe joined the Armour Institute of Technology to head both Armour's and the Art Institute of Chicago's architecture programs. The Art Institute later separated and formed its own program. Mies was tasked with designing a completely new campus, and the result was a spacious, open, 120-acre (48.6 ha) campus set in contrast to the busy, crowded urban neighborhood around it. The first Mies-designed buildings were completed in the mid-1940s, and construction on what is considered the "Mies Campus" continued until the early 1970s.

Engineering and research also saw great growth and expansion from the postwar period until the early 1970s. Illinois Tech experienced its greatest period of growth from 1952 to 1973 under President John T. Rettaliata, a fluid dynamicist whose research accomplishments included work on early development of the jet engine and a seat on the National Aeronautics and Space Council. During this period, Illinois Tech was the largest engineering school in the United States. It housed many research organizations, including IIT Research Institute (formerly Armour Research Foundation and birthplace of magnetic recording wire and tape as well as audio and video cassettes), the Institute of Gas Technology, and the American Association of Railroads.

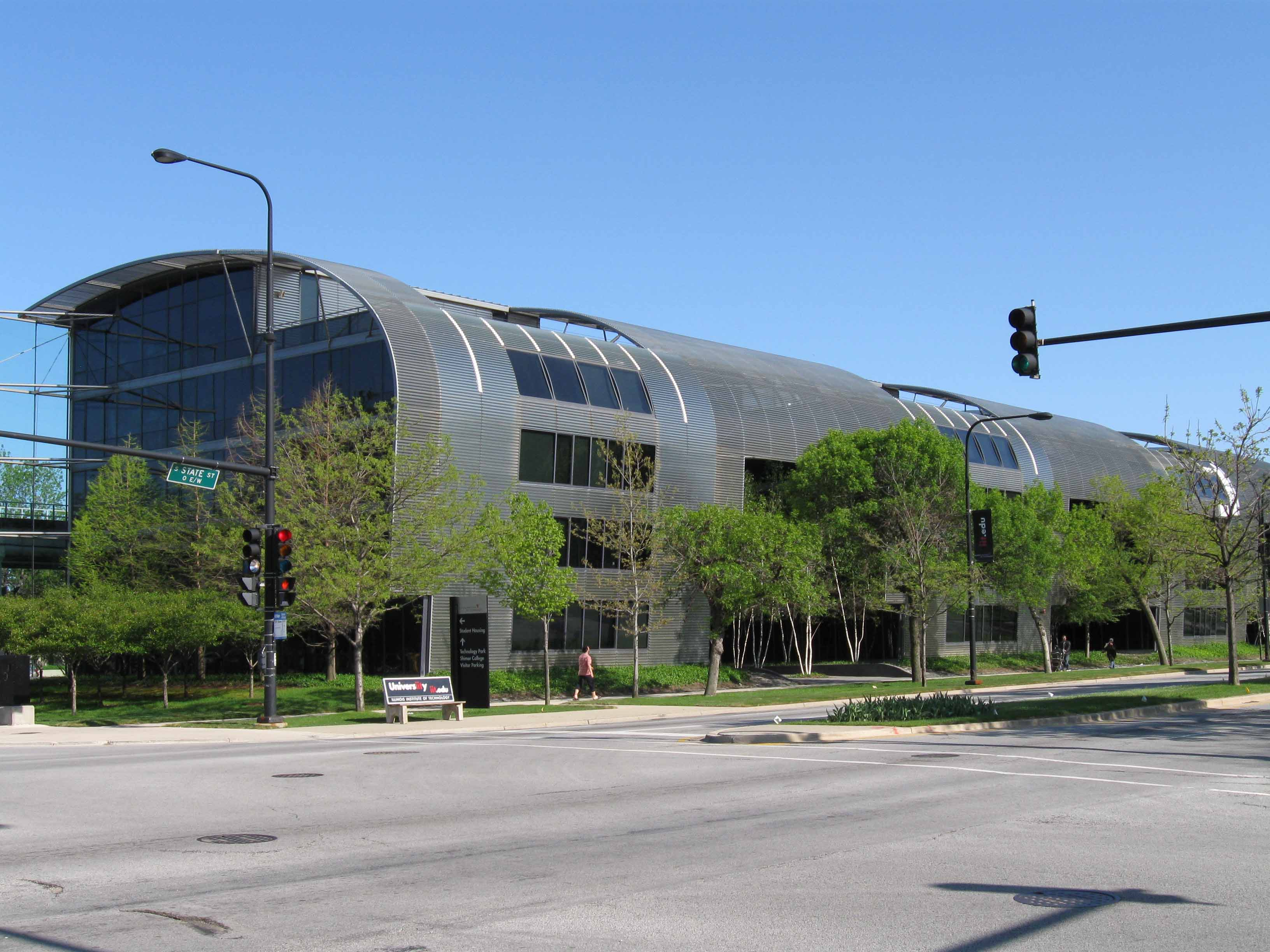
State Street Village IIT dormitories

Three colleges merged with Illinois Tech after the 1940 Armour/Lewis merger: Institute of Design in 1949, Chicago-Kent College of Law in 1969, and Midwest College of Engineering in 1986. Illinois Tech's Stuart School of Business was founded by a gift from Lewis Institute alumnus Harold Leonard Stuart in 1969, and joined Chicago-Kent at Illinois Tech's Downtown Campus in 1992; it phased out its undergraduate program (becoming graduate-only) after 1995. (An undergraduate business program focusing on technology and entrepreneurship was launched in 2004 and was for a while administratively separate from the Stuart School. It is now part of the school but remains on Main Campus.) The Institute of Design, once housed on the Mies Campus in S. R. Crown Hall, also phased out its undergraduate programs and moved downtown in the early 1990s.

Although not used in official communication, the nickname "Illinois Tech" has long been a favorite of students, inspiring the name of the student newspaper; (renamed in 1928 from Armour Tech News to TechNews), and the former mascot of the university's collegiate sports teams, the Techawks. During the 1950s and 1960s, the nickname was more prevalent than "IIT." The Chicago Transit Authority's Green Line rapid transit station at 35th and State was named "Tech-35th" but has since been renamed "35th-Bronzeville-IIT." In the 2010s, school administrators began to reintroduce "Illinois Tech", to avoid confusion with the Indian Institutes of Technology, which is also abbreviated "IIT", and with ITT Technical Institute, whose abbreviation is similar.

In 2020, Illinois Tech launched the College of Computing and the revamped Lewis College of Science and Letters. The College of Computing houses the computer science, applied mathematics, and information technology and management departments, as well as the industrial technology and management program. The revamped Lewis College added the biology, chemistry, food science and nutrition, and physics departments to the humanities, psychology, and social science departments. The School of Applied Technology and College of Science were then dissolved.

=== Today ===
In 1994 the National Commission on IIT considered leaving Mies Campus and moving to the Chicago suburbs. The Chicago Housing Authority had erected massive public-housing developments in the area starting in 1941, and by 1990 the campus was encircled by high-rise housing projects rife with crime. The closest high-rise, Stateway Gardens, was just south of the Illinois Tech campus boundary, the last building of which was demolished in 2006. But the Dearborn Homes to the immediate north of campus still remain. The 1990s and 2000s saw a redevelopment of Stateway Gardens into a new, mixed-income neighborhood dubbed Park Boulevard; the completion of the new central station of the Chicago Police Department a block east of campus; and major commercial development at Roosevelt Road, just north of campus, and residential development as close as Michigan Avenue on the school's eastern boundary.

Bolstered by a $120 million gift in the mid-1990s from Illinois Tech alumnus Robert Pritzker, former chairman of IIT's board of trustees, and Robert Galvin, former chairman of the board and former Motorola executive, the university has benefited from a revitalization. The first new buildings on Mies Campus since the early 1970s were finished in 2003—Rem Koolhaas's McCormick Tribune Campus Center and Helmut Jahn's State Street Village. S. R. Crown Hall, a National Historic Landmark, was renovated in 2005, and the renovation of Wishnick Hall was completed in 2007. Undergraduate enrollment has breached 3,000. To boost the focus on biotechnology and the melding of business and technology, University Technology Park at Illinois Tech, an expansive research park, has been developed by remodeling former Institute of Gas Technology and research buildings on the south end of Mies Campus.

== Campuses ==
Illinois Institute of Technology has five campuses in the Chicago area. The main campus is at 10 West 35th Street in Chicago's Bronzeville neighborhood and houses all undergraduate programs and many graduate programs. There are also campuses in the Chicago Loop, the Fulton Market in central Chicago, and the suburbs of Bedford Park and Wheaton.

The Main Campus includes many buildings designed by Ludwig Mies van der Rohe, the director of the architecture program at Illinois Tech from 1938 to 1958. Part of the 120-acre campus was entered onto the National Register of Historic Places in 2005.

The 10-story Downtown Campus at 565 West Adams Street, designed by Gerald Horn of Holabird & Root and built by Illinois Tech in 1992, was home to Illinois Tech's Chicago-Kent College of Law and Institute of Design (ID), as well as the downtown campus for the Stuart School of Business. The Downtown Campus was renamed the Conviser Law Center in 2020. The Institute of Design has relocated to the Ed Kaplan Family Institute for Innovation and Tech Entrepreneurship on the Mies Campus.

IIT's Fulton Market campus opened in 2023 at 400 North Aberdeen Street. It has a 34,295-square-foot (3,186.1 m^{2}) life science lab.

The 19-acre Daniel F. and Ada L. Rice Campus in Wheaton, designed by Solomon Cordwell Buenz & Associates, Inc. for Illinois Tech and dedicated in 1990, offers graduate programs, upper-level undergraduate courses, and continuing professional education.

The five-acre Moffett Campus in Bedford Park was designed in 1947 by Schmidt, Garden, and Erickson and was donated to Illinois Tech by CPC International Inc. in 1988. It houses the Institute for Food Safety and Health (IFSH), which includes the National Center for Food Safety and Technology, a unique consortium of government, industry, and academic partners.

=== Main campus ===
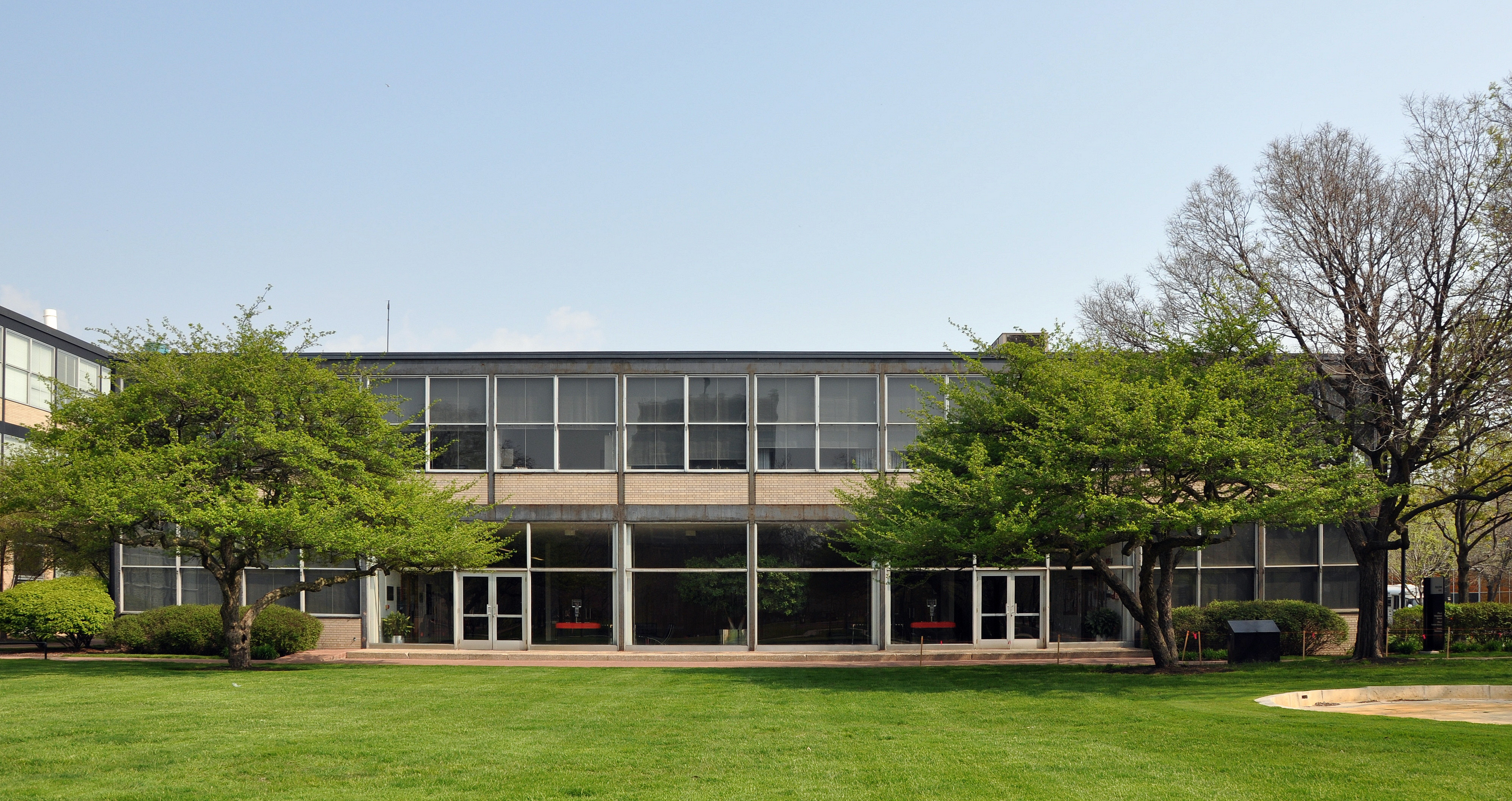
Perlstein Hall: one of the campus buildings designed by Ludwig Mies van der Rohe

Illinois Tech's 120-acre (48.6 ha) main campus, known as Mies Campus, is centered around 33rd and State Streets, about 3 miles (4.8 km) south of the Chicago Loop in the historic Bronzeville neighborhood on Chicago's South Side. It covers 22 blocks, roughly bounded by 30th Street to the north, Michigan Avenue to the east, 35th Street to the south, and the Chicago, Rock Island and Pacific Railroad (now Metra's Rock Island District) tracks to the west. Illinois Tech supports the Historic Bronzeville area by sponsoring non-for-profits such as The Renaissance Collaborative. VanderCook College of Music shares Illinois Tech's main campus and offers cross-registration for Illinois Tech students.

Mies's master plan for the Illinois Tech campus was one of the most ambitious projects he ever conceived, and the campus, with 20 of his works, has the world's greatest concentration of his buildings. The campus layout departs radically from "traditional college quadrangles and limestone buildings". The materials are inspired by the factories and warehouses of Chicago's South Side and "embod[y] 20th century methods and materials: steel and concrete frames with curtain walls of brick and glass." The campus was landscaped by Mies's close colleague at Illinois Tech, Alfred Caldwell, whose plan reinforced Mies's design with "landscaping planted in a free-flowing manner, which in its interaction with the pristine qualities of the architecture, introduce[d] a poetic aspect."

On the west side of Mies Campus are three red brick buildings that were original to Armour Institute, built between 1891 and 1901. In 1938, Mies began his 20-year tenure as director of IIT's School of Architecture. The university was on the verge of building a brand new campus, to be one of the nation's first federally funded urban renewal projects. Mies was given carte blanche in the large commission, and the university grew fast enough during and after World War II to allow much of the new plan to be realized. From 1943 to 1958, as many as 22 Mies buildings rose across campus.

Mies retired in 1958, and Skidmore, Owings & Merrill (SOM) and Schmidt, Garden and Erikson took over as the campus architects. SOM architect Walter Netsch designed two buildings, including the new library Mies had wished to create, while SOM's Myron Goldsmith designed four buildings. Schmidt, Garden & Erikson designed four buildings for the IIT Research Institute during the 1960s. The new campus center, designed by Rem Koolhaas, and a new state-of-the-art residence hall designed by Helmut Jahn, State Street Village, opened in 2003. These were the first new buildings built on the Main Campus in 32 years. Illinois Tech opened its first new academic building in nearly 40 years in 2018, when it dedicated the Ed Kaplan Family Institute for Innovation and Tech Entrepreneurship.

==== Notable buildings ====
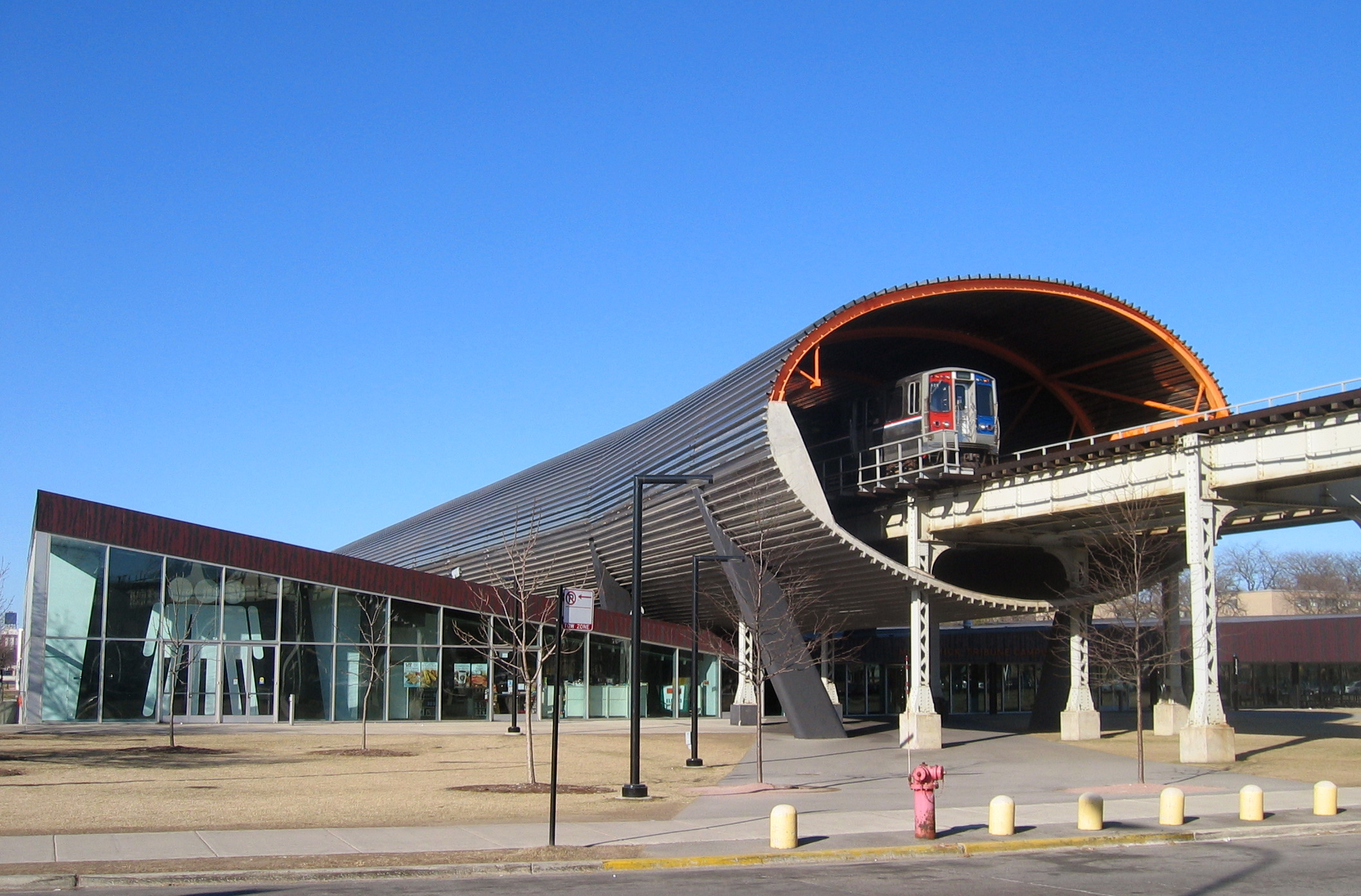
The McCormick Tribune Campus Center. Icons of male figures in action are placed throughout the building; several are visible at the lower left.

S. R. Crown Hall, erected in 1956, has been cited as one of Mies's greatest architectural achievements. To provide for a flexible, columnless interior, he suspended the roof from four steel girders supported by eight exterior columns spaced 60 feet apart. A $15 million renovation, completed in 2005, modernized the structure while preserving its design. Additional improvements were completed in 2013.

State Street Village (SSV), a student residence hall designed by Murphy/Jahn architects on the southeast corner of 33rd and State Streets just south of the campus center, was completed in 2003. Helmut Jahn, who studied architecture at Illinois Tech under Mies van der Rohe in the late 1960s, is responsible for the innovative design of the residence hall. The structure comprises three separate five-story buildings, joined by exterior glass walls that muffle noise from passing trains on the adjacent "L" tracks. SSV houses 367 students in apartment-style and suite-style units.

The McCormick Tribune Campus Center (MTCC), at 33rd and State Streets, opened in 2003. Designed by Dutch architect Rem Koolhaas, the campus center arranges various areas around diagonal pathways, resembling interior streets, that are extensions of the paths students use to cross the campus. The design includes a concrete and stainless steel tube that encloses a 530-foot stretch of the Green Line tracks, passing directly over the one-story campus center building. The tube dampens the sound of trains overhead as students enjoy food courts, student organization offices, retail shops, a recreational facility, and campus events.

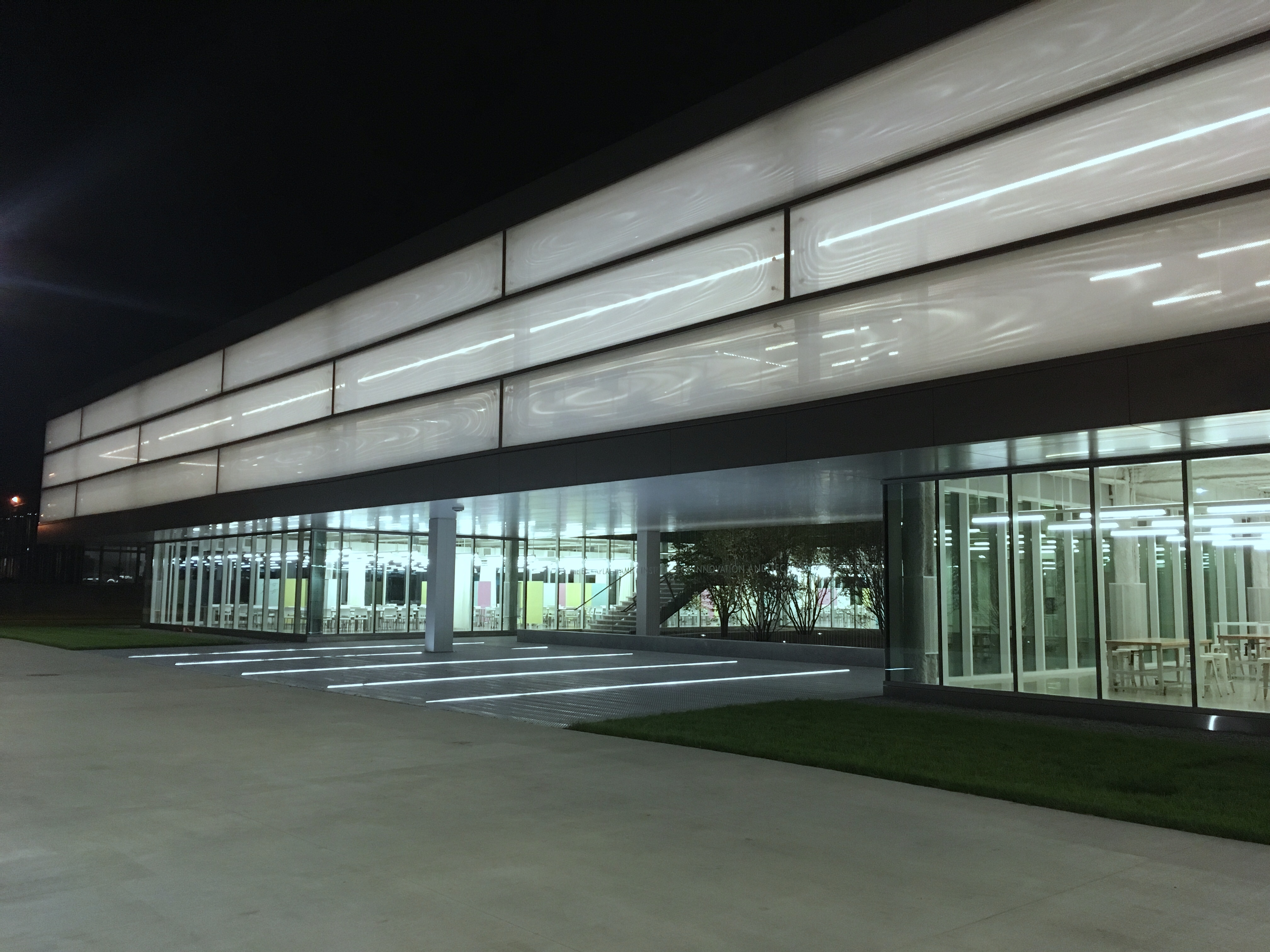
Main entrance of the Kaplan Institute

The newest addition to the Mies Campus came from Chicago architect and College of Architecture professor John Ronan, who was selected to design the Ed Kaplan Family Institute for Innovation and Tech Entrepreneurship. Ronan's building, the first new academic building in more than 40 years, was completed in 2018. In 2019, the Kaplan Center won the American Institute of Architects Chicago Chapter's highest architectural design award.

=== Sustainability ===
In 2010, Illinois Tech received the Princeton Review's highest sustainability rating among Illinois universities, tied with the University of Illinois at Urbana–Champaign.

== Academics ==
Illinois Tech is divided into three colleges (Tech Futures, Design Futures, Professional Futures), and a number of research centers, some of which provide academic programs independent of the other academic units. While many maintain undergraduate programs, some only offer graduate or certificate programs.

In 2003 Illinois Tech administrators split the former Armour College of Engineering and Science into two colleges known as the Armour College of Engineering and the College of Science and Letters. The Armour College of Engineering is composed of five departments: the Department of Biomedical Engineering, the Department of Biological and Chemical Engineering, the Department of Civil, Architectural and Environmental Engineering, the Department of Mechanical, Materials and Aerospace Engineering, and the Department of Computer and Electrical Engineering.

In 2013, Illinois Tech administrators reorganized the College of Science and Letters and Institute of Psychology, forming the College of Science (Department of Applied Mathematics, the Department of Biology, the Department of Chemistry, the Department of Physics, the Department of Computer Science, and the Department of Mathematics and Science Education), and the Lewis College of Human Sciences (the Department of Humanities, the Department of Psychology, and the Department of Social Sciences).

The Institute of Design was founded in 1937 as the New Bauhaus: Chicago School of Design by László Moholy-Nagy. It became known as the Institute of Design in 1944 and later joined Illinois Institute of Technology in 1949.

Illinois Tech also contains the College of Architecture. This college began in 1895 when trustees of Armour Institute and Art Institute merged the architectural programs of both schools to form the Chicago School of Architecture of Armour Institute.

The School of Applied Technology was founded as the Center for Professional Development in 2001 to provide technology oriented education for working professionals. In December 2009 Illinois Tech announced the formation of the School of Applied Technology, composed of undergraduate and graduate degree programs in Industrial Technology and Management (INTM) and Information Technology and Management (ITM), as well as non-credit Professional Learning Programs (PLP). These programs were all formerly part of the Center for Professional Development. Professional Learning Programs offers noncredit continuing education courses and certificates, corporate training, a Professional Engineering Exam Review program, international programs including English as a Second Language instruction, short courses and seminars ranging from a few hours to several days in length. In 2014 the Department of Food Science and Nutrition was formally launched within the School of Applied Technology, formed from degree programs originating within Illinois Tech's Institute for Food Safety and Health (IFSH). The School of Applied Technology was dissolved in June 2020; its departments and programs remained, split between the new College of Computing and Lewis College of Science and Letters.

In August 2026, Illinois Tech administrators consolidated the five colleges into three (Tech Futures, Design Futures, Professional Futures). Tech Futures is composed of the School of Computing, and the School of Engineering, Applied Science, and Health. Design Futures is composed of the School of Design and Society, and the School of Architecture. Professional Futures is composed of Chicago-Kent College of Law, and Stuart School of Business.

Chicago-Kent College of Law began in 1886 with law clerks receiving tutorials from Appellate Judge Joseph M. Bailey to prepare for the newly instated Illinois Bar Examination. By 1888 these evening sessions developed into formal classes and the Chicago College of Law was established. It was not until 1969 that the school was incorporated into Illinois Institute of Technology.

With a bequest from Illinois Tech alumnus and financier Harold Leonard Stuart the Stuart School of Business was established in 1969. In addition to the M.B.A. and PhD, Stuart offers specialized programs in Finance, Mathematical Finance (provided in conjunction with the Illinois Tech Department of Applied Mathematics), Environmental Management and Sustainability (provided in conjunction with the Chicago-Kent College of Law and Department of Civic, Architectural, and Environmental Engineering), Marketing Analytics, and Public Administration. The PhD program in Management Science offers specializations in Finance and Analytics.

Illinois Tech also offers many dual admission programs including programs in medicine, optometry, pharmacy, law, and business.

For the 2024–2025 academic year, the middle 50% of enrolled students scored between 1190 and 1390 on the SAT (with a 50th percentile of 1300), between 590 and 720 on the SAT Evidence-Based Reading and Writing section (50th percentile: 640), and between 590 and 720 on the SAT Math section (50th percentile: 660).

=== Reputation and rankings ===
Academic rankings

National
- Forbes: 154
- U.S. News & World Report: 98
- Washington Monthly: 120
- WSJ/College Pulse: 23

Global
- QS: =591
- THE: 351-400
- U.S. News & World Report: 736

- Illinois Tech was ranked as a tier 1 university being the 122nd best university nationally (climbing seven places up from the previous year), and the third best university in the Chicago metropolitan area (after the University of Chicago and Northwestern University), based on U.S. News & World Report's "Best Colleges 2019."
- In 2018, Forbes ranked Illinois Tech 23rd among STEM universities.
- In 2024, Washington Monthly ranked Illinois Tech 120th among 438 national universities in the U.S. based on Illinois Tech's contribution to the public good, as measured by social mobility, research, and promoting public service.
- Chicago-Kent was ranked as a tier 1 law school being the 68th best law school nationally (5th in Trial Advocacy, 11th in Intellectual Property Law, and 21st in Part-time Law) based on U.S. News & World Report."
- According to U.S. News & World Report, Illinois Tech's Aerospace Engineering was ranked 21, Materials Engineering was ranked 59, Chemical Engineering was ranked 60 and Biomedical Engineering was ranked 61.
- Illinois Tech was designated in 2015 as a National Center of Academic Excellence in Cyber Defense Education by the U.S. Department of Homeland Security and the National Security Agency, acknowledging the substantial focus on cybersecurity and digital forensics in formal degrees, certificates, and specializations in programs offered by the College of Computing.

== Student life ==
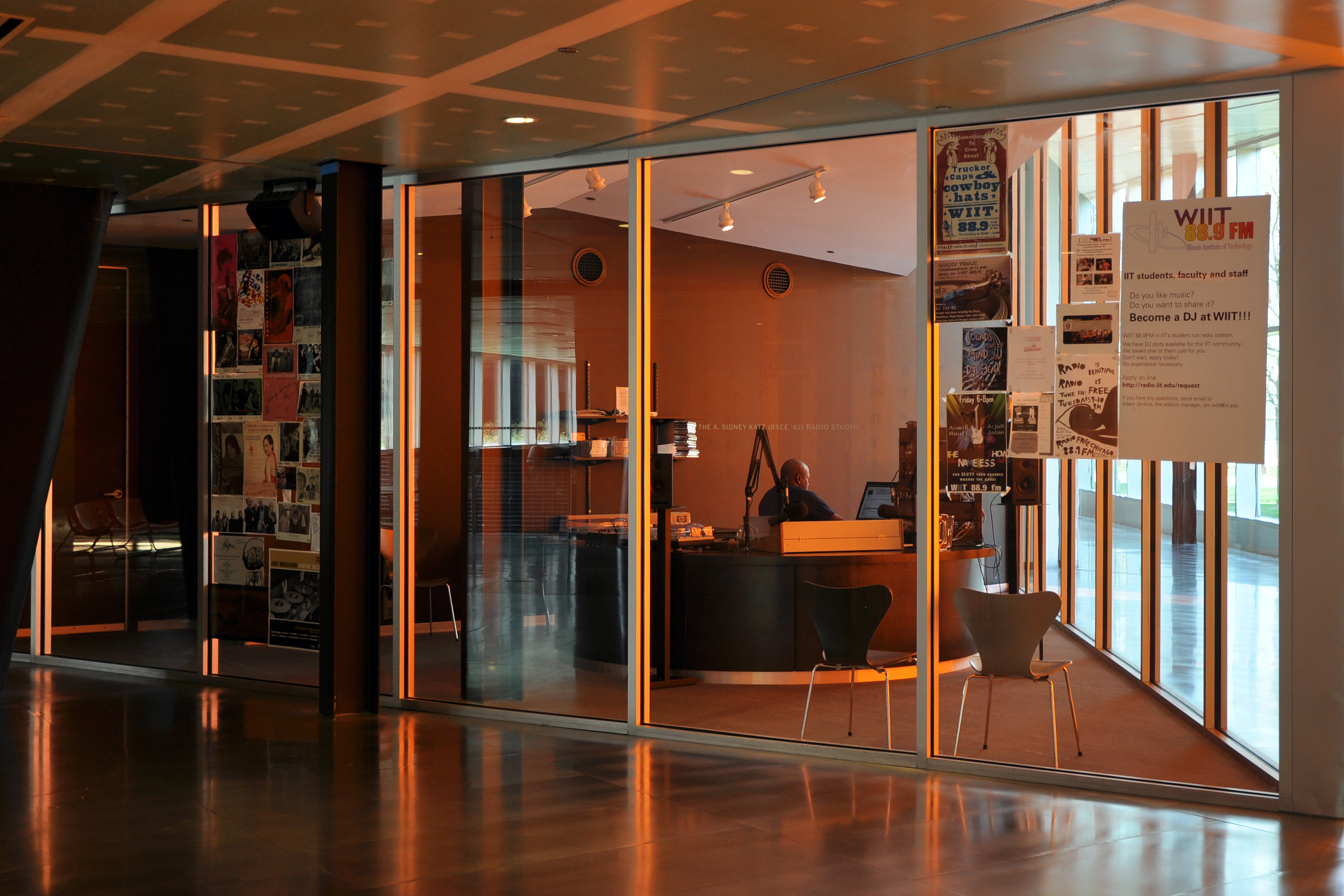
WIIT's studio inside the McCormick Tribune Campus Center

There are numerous student organizations available on campus, including religious groups, academic groups, and student activity groups.

Three of Illinois Tech's major student organizations serve the entire student body: the Student Government Association (SGA), the Student Union Board (UB), and TechNews. SGA is the governing student body and acts as a liaison between university administration and the student body, serves as a forum to express student opinion, and provides certain services to student organizations such as official recognition and distribution of funds. Union Board serves as the main event programming group and plans more than 180 on- and off-campus events for students annually. Founded in 1938 UB is responsible for the emergence of the school spirit and booster group Scarlet Fever. TechNews is the campus paper and serves as a news outlet for campus interests and as another outlet for student opinion in both a weekly paper edition and online format; it has existed since at least the 1930s.

Illinois Tech hosts a campus radio station, WIIT, with a radio studio in The McCormick Tribune Campus Center. WIIT was originally an AM radio station through the 1960s, using the name WIIT Radio 64. It was simulcast on AM 640 and stereo FM 88.9 by the end of January 1972. The station was forced to change its callsign to WOUI in 1972 because WIIT was similar to WAIT (AM). After the WAIT callsign was dropped, the IIT station eventually returned to its original call letters, WIIT, on February 23, 2001.

In September 2007 the university opened a nine-hole disc golf course that weaves around the academic buildings on Mies Campus and is the first disc golf course to appear within the Chicago city limits.

In anticipation of the opening of The McCormick Tribune Campus Center, the on-campus pub and bowling alley known as "The Bog" ceased operations in 2003. However, in response to students, faculty, and staff who missed the former campus hangout, The Bog reopened in February 2007 and offers bowling, billiards, table tennis, and video games. The Bog is also home to the campus bar, which serves beer and wine, and hosts weekly events such as comedians, live bands, or karaoke nights on its stage.

In fall 2007, the third generation of a cappella groups was formed, The TechTonics, a coed group of students. Within a year the organization expanded and now includes an all-male group, the Crown Joules, and an all-female group, the X-Chromotones. IIT A Cappella performs a variety of shows on campus as well as off campus and in the midwest. They also perform shows at the end of each semester.

Illinois Institute of Technology Mies (Main) Campus has seven Illinois Tech fraternities (and one VanderCook College of Music fraternity) and three sororities. Fraternities Pi Kappa Phi, Delta Tau Delta, Alpha Sigma Phi, Phi Kappa Sigma, Sigma Phi Epsilon and Triangle Fraternity and sororities Kappa Phi Delta, and Alpha Sigma Alpha have chapter houses on The Quad. The Omega Delta fraternity does not.

== Athletics ==
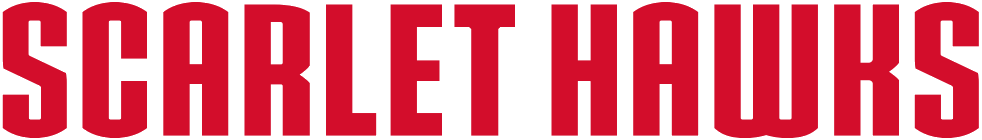
Illinois Tech athletics wordmark

The Illinois Tech (IIT) athletic teams are called the Scarlet Hawks. The university is a member of the Division III level of the National Collegiate Athletic Association (NCAA), primarily competing in the Northern Athletics Collegiate Conference (NACC) since the 2018–19 academic year; coinciding with the program's acceptance as a full NCAA Division III member. The Scarlet Hawks previously competed in the Division I level of the National Association of Intercollegiate Athletics (NAIA), primarily competing in the Chicagoland Collegiate Athletic Conference (CCAC) until after the 2012–13 season, as well as a member of the United States Collegiate Athletic Association (USCAA), until the athletic program completed the transition to NCAA Division III after the 2017–18 season (which competed during five seasons as an NCAA D-III Independent during its provisional member status from 2013–14 to 2017–18).

Illinois Tech competes in 19 intercollegiate varsity sports: Men's sports include baseball, basketball, cross country, lacrosse, soccer, swimming & diving, tennis, track & field (indoor and outdoor) and volleyball; while women's sports include basketball, cross country, lacrosse, soccer, swimming & diving, tennis, track & field (indoor and outdoor) and volleyball. Illinois Tech also has a cricket team as a part of non-varsity sports level that competes in Division II of the Midwest Cricket Conference.

=== Basketball ===
Illinois Tech discontinued its men's and women's basketball programs after the 2008–09 season, but re-instated them beginning with the 2012–13 season. The men's basketball team played in its first USCAA Division I Championship in March 2017. Although the team lost to Concordia Alabama, the Scarlet Hawks finished the season at 22–6.

=== Track and field ===
Illinois Tech's oldest athletics program is track and field, with the Armour Institute team starting in 1893. The Lewis Institute team dominated the early 1900s with Olympic athletes like William Hogenson, Louis Wilkins, George M. Varnell, Harlan Page and Charles Dvorak. The latter would go on to become the first Track coach for Armour in 1905. The track program was boosted during World War II with the V-12 Navy program led by Norman Hankins, who would go on to be a 3-time NCAA All-American. In the early 1950's the team was captained by pole vaulter and future psychologist Irving Gottesman. The track program was disbanded after 1963 and was brought back as a club team in 2004 and as a varsity team in 2011. The team has produced 25 NCAA or NAIA National Qualifiers since inception.

== Notable faculty ==
=== Faculty (current and former) ===
- Chaudhary Ajit Singh, former Indian Minister of Agriculture, Commerce and Industry and Civil Aviation
- Virgil Abloh, fashion designer (Creative Director for Louis Vuitton and Founder of Off-White x Nike), entrepreneur, DJ
- John L. Anderson, professor of chemical engineering
- Lori Andrews, professor of law
- Wiel Arets, professor of architecture
- Shlomo Argamon, professor of computer science
- Carol Ross Barney, adjunct professor of architecture
- John F. O. Bilson, professor of finance, dean of Stuart School of Business
- Harry Callahan, professor of photography
- Cosmo Campoli, professor of sculpture
- Patrick Corrigan, professor of psychology
- Michael Davis, professor of philosophy
- Martha Evens, emeritus professor
- Martin Felsen, associate professor of architecture
- Lance Fortnow, dean of the College of Computing
- Susan Fromberg Schaeffer, assistant professor of English
- Lois Graham, professor of mechanical engineering
- S. I. Hayakawa, professor of English
- Mar Hicks, associate professor of history of technology
- Fazlur Khan, adjunct professor of structural engineering
- Albert Henry Krehbiel, professor of art
- Walter McCrone, professor of microscopy and materials science
- Josephine Janina Mehlberg, mathematician
- Karl Menger, professor of mathematics
- Hassan Nagib, John T. Rettaliata Professor of Mechanical and Aerospace Engineering
- László Moholy-Nagy, professor of design
- Art Paul, designer, creator of Playboy logo
- Walter Peterhans, taught 'visual training' course for architecture students
- Sonja Petrović, associate professor of applied mathematics
- Nambury S. Raju, professor of psychology
- Edward Reingold, professor of computer science and applied mathematics
- Ludwig Mies van der Rohe, professor of architecture
- John Ronan, professor of architecture
- Mohammad Shahidehpour, Bodine Chair professor of electrical and computer engineering
- Tamara Goldman Sher, professor of psychology
- Arthur Siegel, professor of photography
- Aaron Siskind, professor of photography
- Nellie Bangs Skelton, professor of piano
- Abe Sklar, professor of applied mathematics
- Susan Solomon, discover the hole in ozone layer, leader in Atmospheric Chemistry, inducted in National's Women Hall of Fame
- Robert Bruce Tague, professor of architecture
- David Tannor (born 1958), theoretical chemist, Hermann Mayer Professorial Chair in the Department of Chemical Physics at the Weizmann Institute of Science
- John Henry Waddell, professor of sculpture and art
- John Heskett, professor of design
- Charles N. Haas, Betz Professor of Environmental Engineering, Drexel University (IIT BS 1973, MS 1974); was a faculty member at IIT from 1981 to 1990. Member, National Academy of Engineering

==== Nobel laureate faculty ====
- Leon M. Lederman, professor of physics; Nobel laureate in physics (1988); director emeritus of Fermilab; founded the Illinois Mathematics and Science Academy
- Herbert A. Simon, professor of psychology; political, economic, psychological and computer science polymath; Nobel laureate in economics (1978)
- Jack Steinberger, physicist; Nobel laureate in physics (1988); studied chemical engineering at Armour Institute of Technology but his scholarship ended and he had to leave

== See also ==
- Architecture of Chicago
- Chicago–Kent College of Law
- IIT Physics Department
- IIT Research Institute (IITRI)
- McCormick Tribune Campus Center
