= Jerzy Michalski =

Polish historian

Jerzy Michalski (9 April 1924 in Warsaw – 26 February 2007 in Warsaw) was a Polish historian, specializing in the 18th and 19th centuries. He was a professor of the Institute of History at the Polish Academy of Sciences.

== Selected works ==
- Michalski, Jerzy (1977). Rousseau i sarmacki republikanizm [Rousseau and Polish Republicanism] (in Polish). Warsaw: Państwowe Wydawnictwo Naukowe.
