= Sonja Petrović (statistician) =

Serbian-American statistician

- Citizenship: American
- Education: University of Kentucky (Ph.D.); University of Tennessee at Chattanooga (B.S.)
- Awards: Elected to International Institute of Statistics
- Scientific career
- Fields: Mathematics
- Workplaces: Illinois Institute of Technology
- Thesis: Algebraic and Combinatorial Properties of Certain Toric Ideals in the Theory and Applications (2008)
- Doctoral advisor: Uwe Nagel
- Website: http://www.sonjapetrovicstats.com

Sonja Petrović is a Serbian-American statistician and associate professor in the Department of Applied Mathematics, College of Computing, at Illinois Institute of Technology. Her research is focused on mathematical statistics and algebraic statistics, applied and computational algebraic geometry and random graph (network) models. She was elected to the International Statistics Institute in 2015.

== Education and career ==
Petrović did her undergraduate work at the University of Tennessee at Chattanooga and received her B.S. degree in applied mathematics, magna cum laude in 2003. She minored in music performance at Chattanooga. Petrović did her doctoral work in mathematics at the University of Kentucky in Lexington, Kentucky, specializing in commutative algebra. Her dissertation Algebraic and Combinatorial Properties of Certain Toric Ideals in the Theory and Applications was directed by Uwe Nagel. Petrović was awarded her Ph.D. by Kentucky in 2008.

After her doctoral studies, Petrović held a post-doctoral position at the University of Illinois at Chicago from 2008 to 2011. She was a research fellow at the Statistical and Applied Mathematical Sciences Institute based in Research Triangle Park, North Carolina, in 2009, participating in the Program on Algebraic Methods in Systems Biology and Statistics. After holding the position of assistant professor of statistics at Pennsylvania State University from 2011 to 2013, Petrović joined the faculty of Illinois Tech as an assistant professor of applied mathematics in 2013. She was promoted to associate professor at Illinois Tech in 2017.

In 2011, Petrović visited the Mittag-Leffler Institute in Djursholm, Sweden and participated in the program "Algebraic Geometry with a View Towards Applications". In 2016, she was a long-term participant in the "Theoretical Foundations of Statistical Network Analysis Program" at the Isaac Newton Institute of Mathematical Sciences in Cambridge, United Kingdom. Petrović was a co-organizer of the “Summer School on Randomness and Learning in Non-Linear Algebra” at the Max Planck Institute for Mathematics located in Leipzig, Germany in July 2019.

She received an Illinois Tech College of Science Junior Research Excellence Award in 2015 and an Excellence in Teaching Award for the College of Science in April 2018..
