= Bacardi Building =

Bacardi Building may refer to:

- Bacardi Building (Havana), building in Cuba
- Bacardi Building (Mexico City), building in Mexico
- Bacardi Buildings (Miami), buildings in US
