= Carman Hall (disambiguation) =

Carman Hall is a dormitory at Columbia University.

Carman Hall may also refer to:

- Carman Hall (Eastern Illinois University), a dormitory
- Carman Hall (Illinois Institute of Technology), a dormitory
