= Georgia van der Rohe =

German dancer, actress, and director

Georgia van der Rohe (born Dorothea Mies; March 2, 1914 – December 10, 2008) was a German dancer, actress, and director.

== Life ==
Georgia van der Rohe, daughter of the renowned architect Ludwig Mies van der Rohe and his wife Ada, grew up in the company of Walter Gropius, Lyonel Feininger, Paul Klee, Oskar Schlemmer and Wassily Kandinsky.

Van der Rohe had two children.
