= Richard King Mellon Hall =

Building at Duquesne University, Pennsylvania

Richard King Mellon Hall of Science
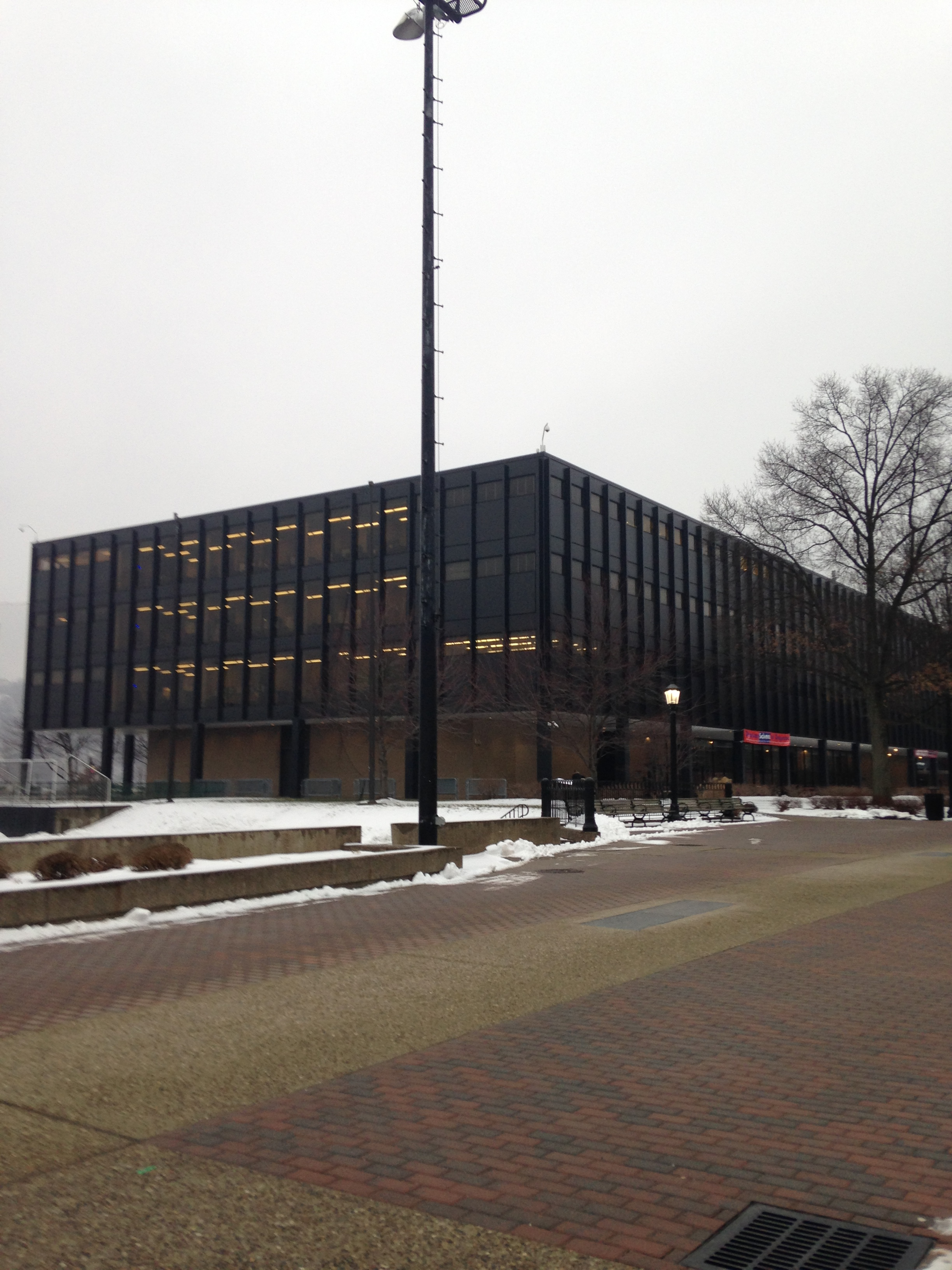
- Richard King Mellon Hall of Science
- Interactive map of the Richard King Mellon Hall of Science area

General information
- Status: Completed
- Type: Academic
- Architectural style: Modernism, International Style
- Location: Bluff Street; Pittsburgh, Pennsylvania, United States
- Coordinates: 40.43562°N 79.99156°W
- Completed: 1968

Technical details
- Floor count: 4

Design and construction
- Architect: Ludwig Mies van der Rohe

Richard King Mellon Hall of Science, also known as Mellon Hall, is an academic facility on the Duquesne University campus in Pittsburgh, Pennsylvania, United States. Designed by architect Ludwig Mies van der Rohe, the four-story building has two large lecture halls on the ground floor and three floors of lab facilities above. It sits at the edge of a bluff overlooking the Monongahela River. Mellon Hall currently serves the Biological Sciences, Chemistry & Biochemistry, and Pharmacy departments of Duquesne University.

== Building design ==
The ground floor is set back from the perimeter columns, forming a generous colonnade that wraps around all four sides of the building. The first level has floor-to-ceiling glass on the center bays of the south and north elevations with solid buff-colored brick on the end bays. Most of Mies' projects have an odd number of bays (classic order) with a focused entry in the center, but Mellon Hall is an exception because it has 12 structural bays in the long direction and has less assuming split entrances.

The three top levels have a black steel and tinted grey glass façade. The upper floor plans have a double loaded internal loop corridor with laboratories along the perimeter of the long axis and the elevator, stairs, and support spaces located in a compact internal core. Due to the lab requirements there is less glass than in many of Mies' other projects, but there is a row of clearstory lights along the long south and north facades, providing natural daylight light to the perimeter labs. The façade at the east and west ends of the building open up more with floor-to-ceiling glass; here the corridor is only single loaded and there are break areas at the ends of the building. Here Mies employed his signature steel vertical I-beam detail at the mullions. These vertical I-beams express the structural language of the building, emphasize the vertical proportion, and add depth and shadow to the long facade.

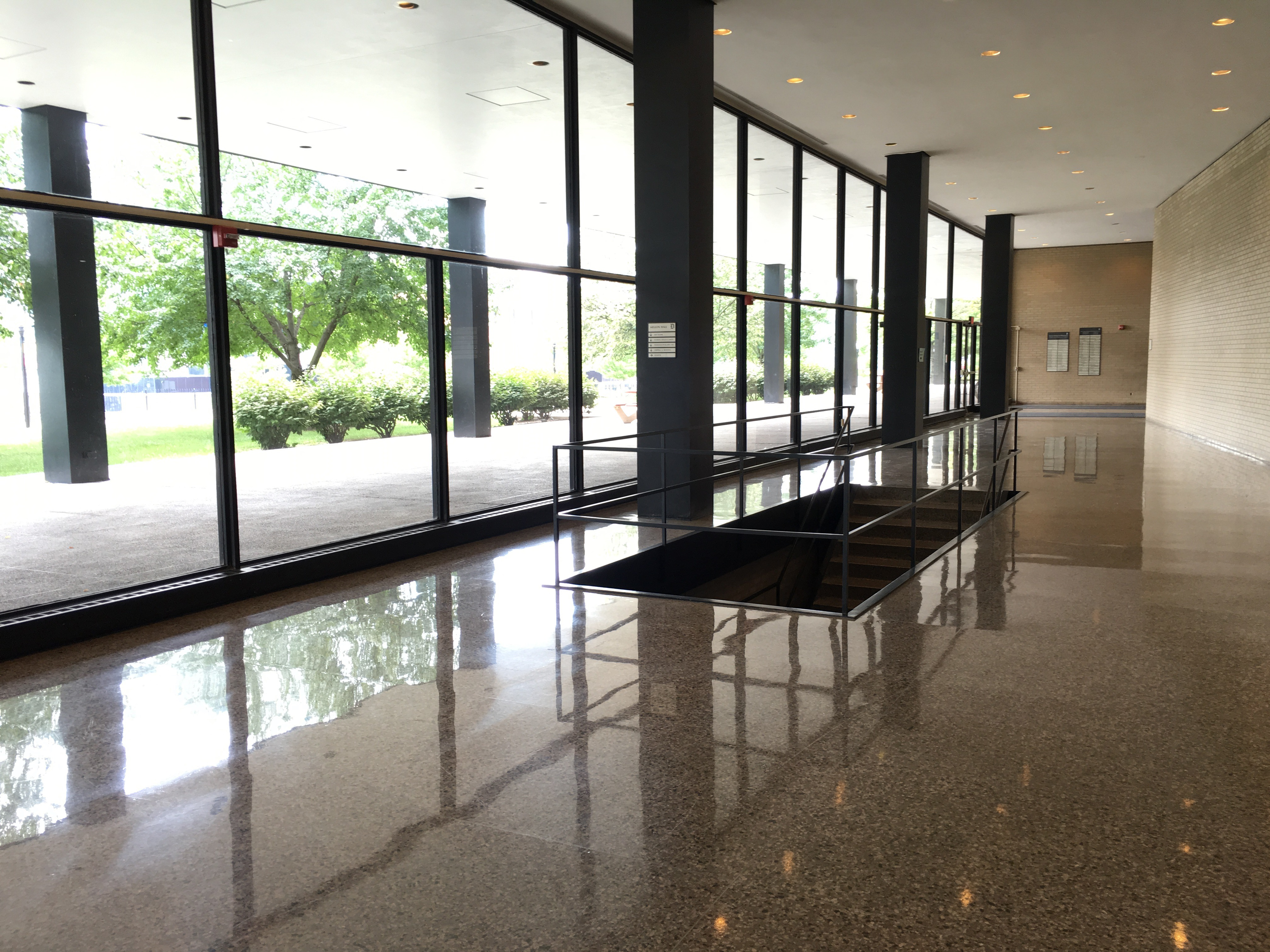
The south lobby of the Richard King Mellon hall

The split entrances occur near the entry points of the two back-to-back lecture halls, each seating roughly 250. The interior spaces on the ground floor have exposed buff brick walls, the same as the exterior. The internal two fan shaped lecture halls, form a core with buff brick walls on the sides and curved wood walls on the ends. The floors on the first floor are a tan terrazzo. The interior finishes are not as luxurious in the upper three floors. These upper floors have do have the exposed brick interior walls, but the floors are black tile and the lighting is not recessed and smooth in with the ceiling plane.

== Awards ==
- Laboratory of the Year Award by Industrial Research Magazine 1969
