= Peter Roesch =

German–American modernist architect

- Born: August 30, 1929; Leipzig, Germany
- Died: September 24, 2018 (aged 89); Chicago, Illinois, U.S.
- Occupations: Architect, educator
- Known for: Modernist architecture; student of Ludwig Mies van der Rohe
- Spouse: Vibeke "Biba" Roesch

Peter Roesch (August 30, 1929 – September 24, 2018) was a German–American modernist architect and educator active in the Chicago area. A student of Ludwig Mies van der Rohe at the Illinois Institute of Technology (IIT), Roesch designed several commercial and institutional buildings and taught architecture for many years, primarily in Chicago. He has been discussed in local and scholarly literature on Chicago modernism.

== Early life and education ==
Roesch was born in Leipzig, Germany, on August 30, 1929. He studied architecture in Hamburg before coming to the United States as a Fulbright scholar and enrolling at the Illinois Institute of Technology, where he studied under Ludwig Mies van der Rohe and completed a master's thesis in 1956 titled A Non‑Denominational Church.

== Career ==
After graduating, Roesch worked briefly for firms in Chicago (including a period at Skidmore, Owings & Merrill) and later practiced under Hammond & Roesch and in his own atelier. He taught architecture at IIT and the University of Illinois at Chicago (UIC) and was an active member of the Chicago architectural community.

== Selected works ==
- Villa Park Bank (1964; later BMO Harris Bank), Villa Park, Illinois — a single‑story modernist suburban bank with floor-to-ceiling glass walls and exposed steel trusses. The branch has been discussed in architectural commentary as an example of Miesian influence in suburban commercial architecture; structural decisions responded to poor soils at the site and invoked an elevated, bridge‑like support system.
- Episcopal Diocese of Chicago Building (65 E. Huron Street, Chicago; 1969) — an office building for the Episcopal Diocese that local coverage described as a restrained modernist intervention in context.

== Teaching ==
Roesch taught architecture for many years, and his papers and photographic slides (including documentation related to S. R. Crown Hall) are held in the Paul V. Galvin Library at IIT.

== Personal life and death ==
Roesch was married to Vibeke “Biba” Roesch for 54 years. He died in his Chicago apartment on September 24, 2018, aged 89.

== Legacy ==
Roesch has been described in the Chicago press and architectural circles as one of the architects who transmitted Miesian modernist principles into post‑war Chicago and suburban commercial architecture. His Villa Park bank remains a cited example of modernism applied to suburban banking architecture, and institutional archival holdings preserve his academic and teaching materials.
