= Ludwig Mies van der Rohe =

German-American architect (1886–1969)

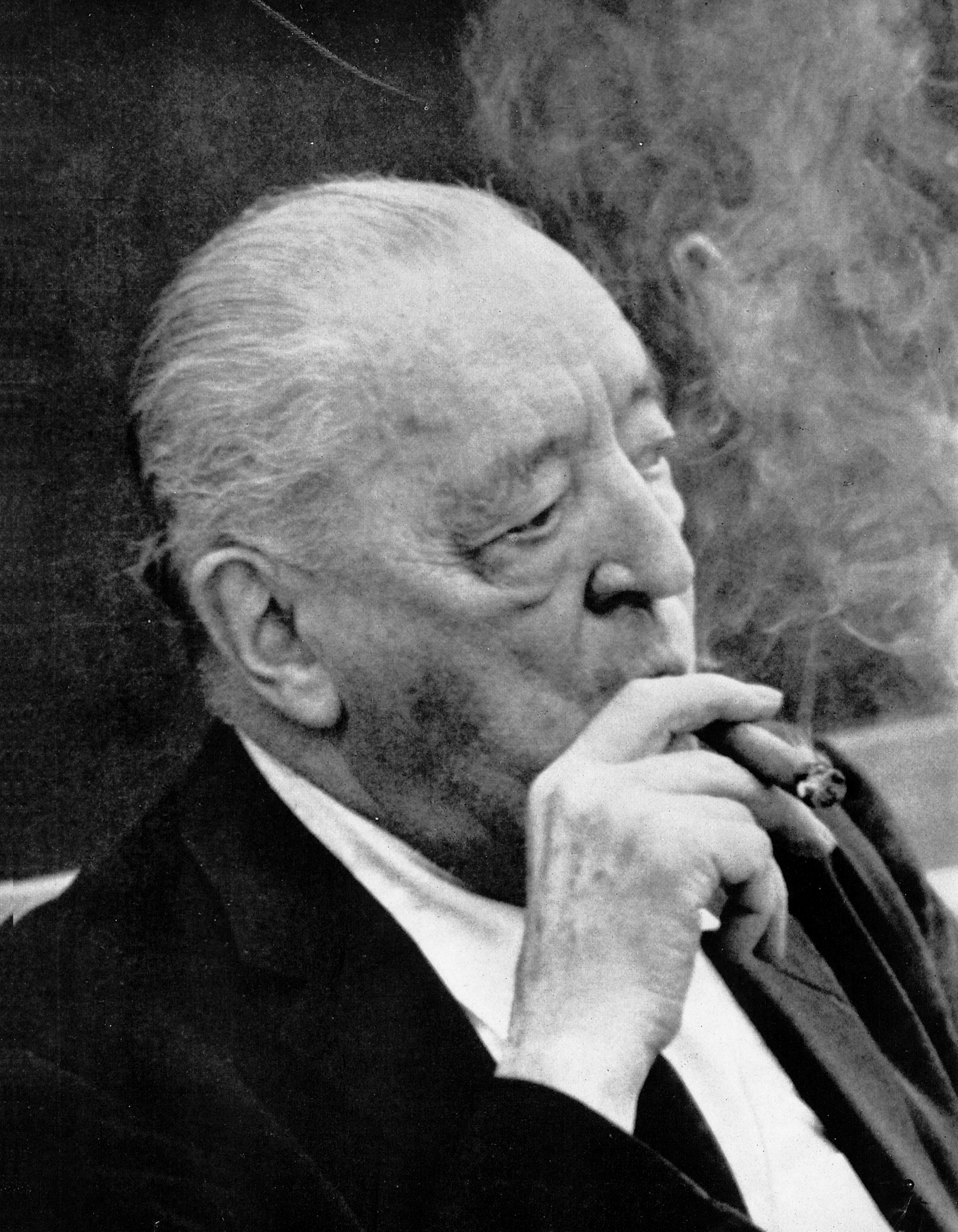
- c. 1960
- Born: Maria Ludwig Michael Mies; March 27, 1886; Aachen, Kingdom of Prussia, German Empire
- Died: August 17, 1969 (aged 83); Chicago, Illinois, U.S.
- Citizenship: Germany (1886–1944); United States (1944–1969)
- Occupation: Architect
- Spouse: Adele Auguste Bruhn (m. 1913; sep. 1918)
- Children: 4
- Awards: Pour le Mérite (1959); Royal Gold Medal (1959); AIA Gold Medal (1960); Presidential Medal of Freedom (1963)
- Buildings: Barcelona Pavilion; Crown Hall; Farnsworth House; Highfield House; IIT Main Campus; 860–880 Lake Shore Drive; One Charles Center; Seagram Building; New National Gallery; Toronto-Dominion Centre; Tugendhat House; Westmount Square; Martin Luther King Jr. Memorial Library

Ludwig Mies van der Rohe (/miːs ... roʊ/ MEESS-...-ROH; German: [ˈluːtvɪç ˈmiːs fan deːɐ̯ ˈʁoːə]; born Maria Ludwig Michael Mies; March 27, 1886 – August 17, 1969) was a German and American architect, academic, and interior designer. He was commonly referred to as Mies, his surname. He is regarded as one of the pioneers of modern architecture.

In the 1930s, Mies was the last director of the Bauhaus, a ground-breaking school of modernist art, design and architecture in Germany. After Nazism's rise to power, due to its strong opposition to modernism, he emigrated to the United States in 1937 or 1938. He accepted the position to head the architecture school at what is today the Illinois Institute of Technology (IIT).

Mies sought to establish his own particular architectural style that could represent modern times. His buildings made use of modern materials such as industrial steel and plate glass to define interior spaces. He is often associated with his fondness for the aphorisms "less is more" and "God is in the details".

== Early career ==
Mies was born March 27, 1886, in Aachen, Germany. He worked in his father's stone carving shop and at several local design firms before he moved to Berlin, where he joined the office of interior designer Bruno Paul. He began his architectural career as an apprentice at the studio of Peter Behrens from 1908 to 1912, where he was exposed to the current design theories and to progressive German culture. He worked alongside Le Corbusier and Walter Gropius, who was later also involved in the development of the Bauhaus. Mies served as construction manager of the Embassy of the German Empire in Saint Petersburg under Behrens.

Ludwig Mies renamed himself as part of his transformation from a tradesman's son to an architect working with Berlin's cultural elite, adding "van der" and his mother's maiden name "Rohe" and using the Dutch "van der", because the German form "von" was a nobiliary particle legally restricted to those of German nobility lineage. He began his independent professional career designing upper-class homes.

== Personal life ==
In 1913, Mies married Adele Auguste (Ada) Bruhn (1885–1951), the daughter of a wealthy industrialist. The couple separated in 1918, after having three daughters: Dorothea (1914–2008), an actress and dancer who was known as Georgia, Marianne (1915–2003), and Waltraut (1917–1959), who was a research scholar and curator at the Art Institute of Chicago. During his military service in 1917, Mies fathered a son out of wedlock.

In 1925, Mies began a relationship with designer Lilly Reich that ended when he moved to the United States; from 1940 until his death, artist Lora Marx (1900–1989) was his primary companion. Mies carried on a romantic relationship with sculptor and art collector Mary Callery for whom he designed an artist's studio in Huntington, New York. He had a brief romantic relationship with Nelly van Doesburg. After having met in Europe many years prior, they met again in New York in 1947 during a dinner with Josep Lluís Sert where he promised her he would help organize an exhibition in Chicago featuring the work of her late husband Theo van Doesburg. This exhibition took place from October 15 until November 8, 1947, with their romance officially ending not much later. Nevertheless they remained on good terms, spending Easter together in 1948 at a modern farmhouse renovated by Mies on Long Island, as well as meeting several more times that year.

== Transition from traditionalism to Modernism ==
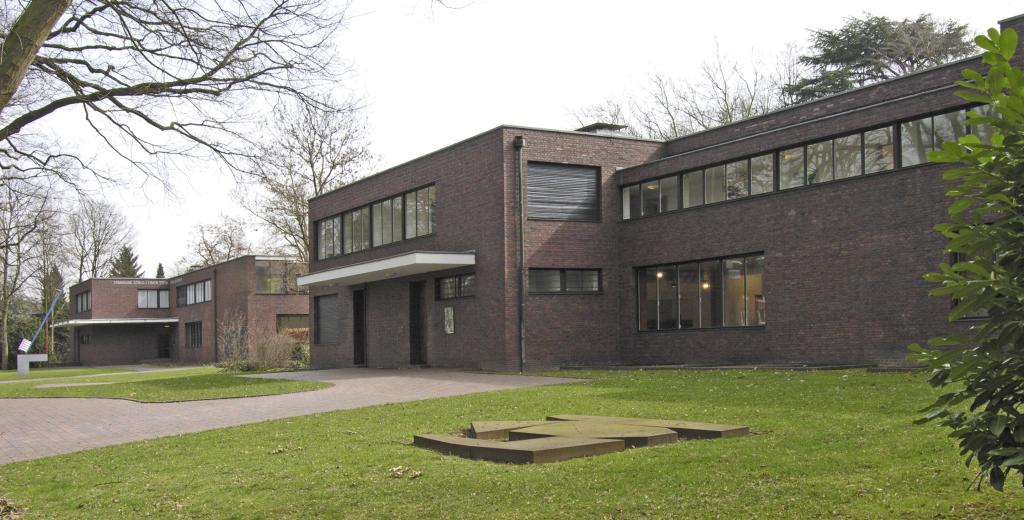
Haus Lange and Haus Esters in Krefeld, Germany, designed by Ludwig Mies van der Rohe and completed in 1930. The neighboring brick villas are notable examples of his early modernist residential architecture.

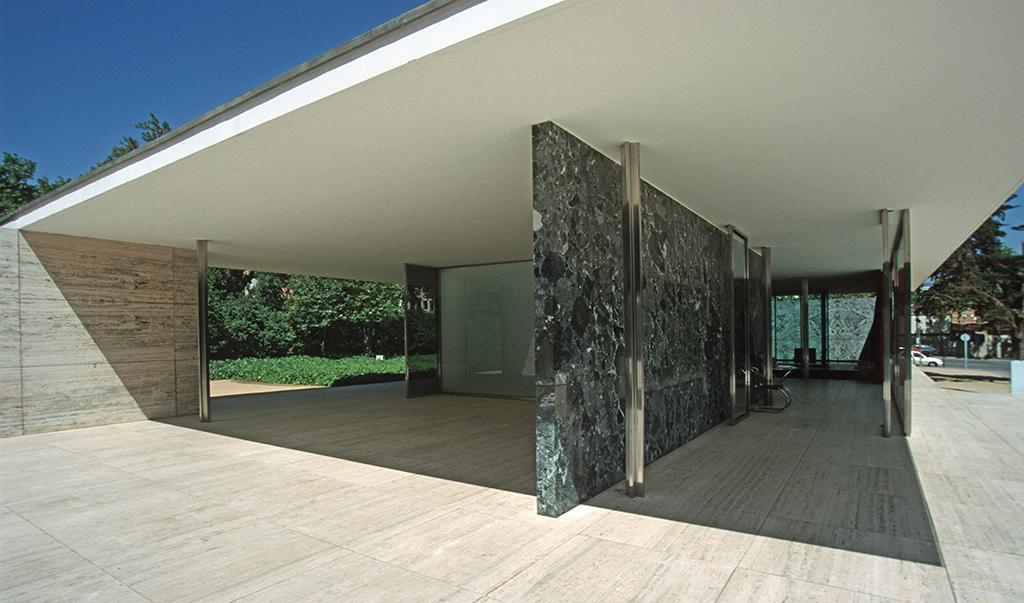
Barcelona Pavilion in Barcelona, constructed in 1929 for the world exposition. Never intended to be permanent, it was demolished in 1930 as was typically done for exhibition structures, but it was re-erected in 1986 by a team of local architects.

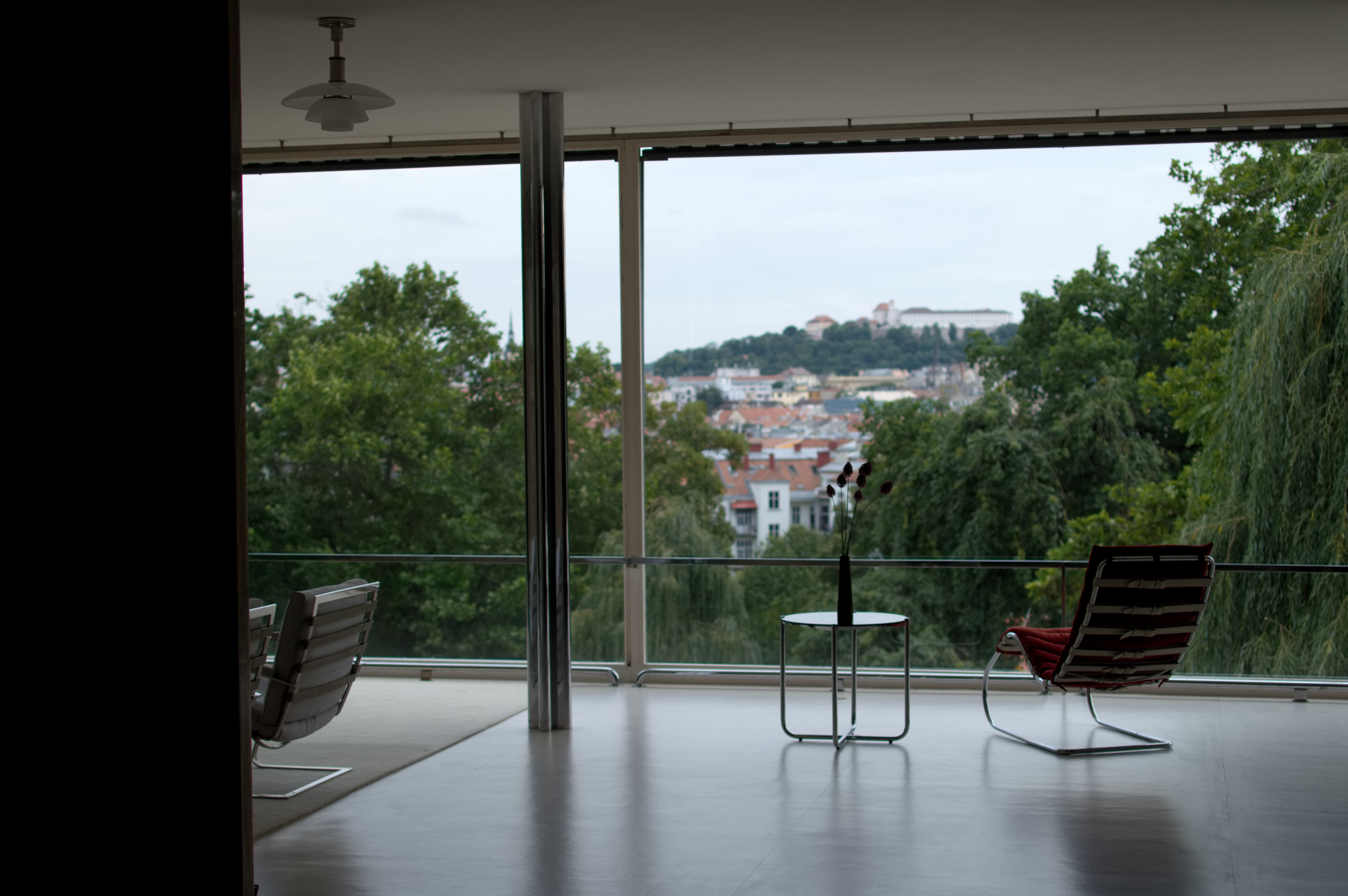
Villa Tugendhat built in 1930 in Brno for Fritz Tugendhat

After World War I, while still designing traditional neoclassical homes, Mies began a parallel experimental effort. He joined his avant-garde peers in the long-running search for a new style that would be suitable for the modern industrial age. The weak points of traditional styles had been under attack by progressive theorists since the mid-nineteenth century, primarily for the contradictions of hiding modern construction technology with a facade of ornamented traditional styles.

The mounting criticism of the historical styles gained substantial cultural credibility after World War I, a disaster widely seen as a failure of the old world order of imperial leadership of Europe. The aristocratic classical revival styles were particularly reviled by many as the architectural symbol of a now-discredited and outmoded social system. Progressive thinkers called for a completely new architectural design process guided by rational problem-solving and an exterior expression of modern materials and structure rather than what they considered the superficial application of classical facades.

While continuing his traditional neoclassical design practice, Mies began to develop visionary projects that, though mostly unbuilt, rocketed him to fame as an architect capable of giving form that was in harmony with the spirit of the emerging modern society. Boldly abandoning ornament altogether, Mies made a dramatic modernist debut in 1921 with his stunning competition proposal for the faceted all-glass Friedrichstraße skyscraper, followed by a taller curved version in 1922 named the Glass Skyscraper.

He constructed his first modernist house with the Villa Wolf in 1926 in Guben (today Gubin, Poland) for Erich and Elisabeth Wolf. This was shortly followed by Haus Lange and Haus Esters in Krefeld in 1928.

He continued with a series of pioneering projects, culminating in his two European masterworks: the temporary German Pavilion for the Barcelona exposition (often called the Barcelona Pavilion) in 1929 (a 1986 reconstruction is now built on the original site) and the elegant Villa Tugendhat in Brno, Czechoslovakia, completed in 1930.

He joined the German avant-garde, working with the progressive design magazine G, which started in July 1923. He developed prominence as architectural director of the Werkbund, organizing the influential Weissenhof Estate prototype modernist housing exhibition. He was also one of the founders of the architectural association Der Ring. He joined the avant-garde Bauhaus design school as their director of architecture, adopting and developing their functionalist application of simple geometric forms in the design of useful objects. He served as its last director.

Like many other avant-garde architects of the day, Mies based his architectural mission and principles on his understanding and interpretation of ideas developed by theorists and critics who pondered the declining relevance of the traditional design styles. He selectively adopted theoretical ideas such as the aesthetic credos of Russian Constructivism with their ideology of "efficient" sculptural assembly of modern industrial materials. Mies found appeal in the use of simple rectilinear and planar forms, clean lines, pure use of color, and the extension of space around and beyond interior walls expounded by the Dutch De Stijl group. In particular, the layering of functional sub-spaces within an overall space and the distinct articulation of parts as expressed by Gerrit Rietveld appealed to Mies.

As households in the middle class and upper class could increasingly afford household appliances, modern architects like Mies, Le Corbusier, Walter Gropius and Adolf Loos rejected decorative architecture and became drivers of a modern Arts and Crafts movement in Europe.

Mies and Le Corbusier later acknowledged the lasting impact Frank Lloyd Wright's Wasmuth Portfolio had after it was exhibited in Berlin.

== Emigration to the United States ==
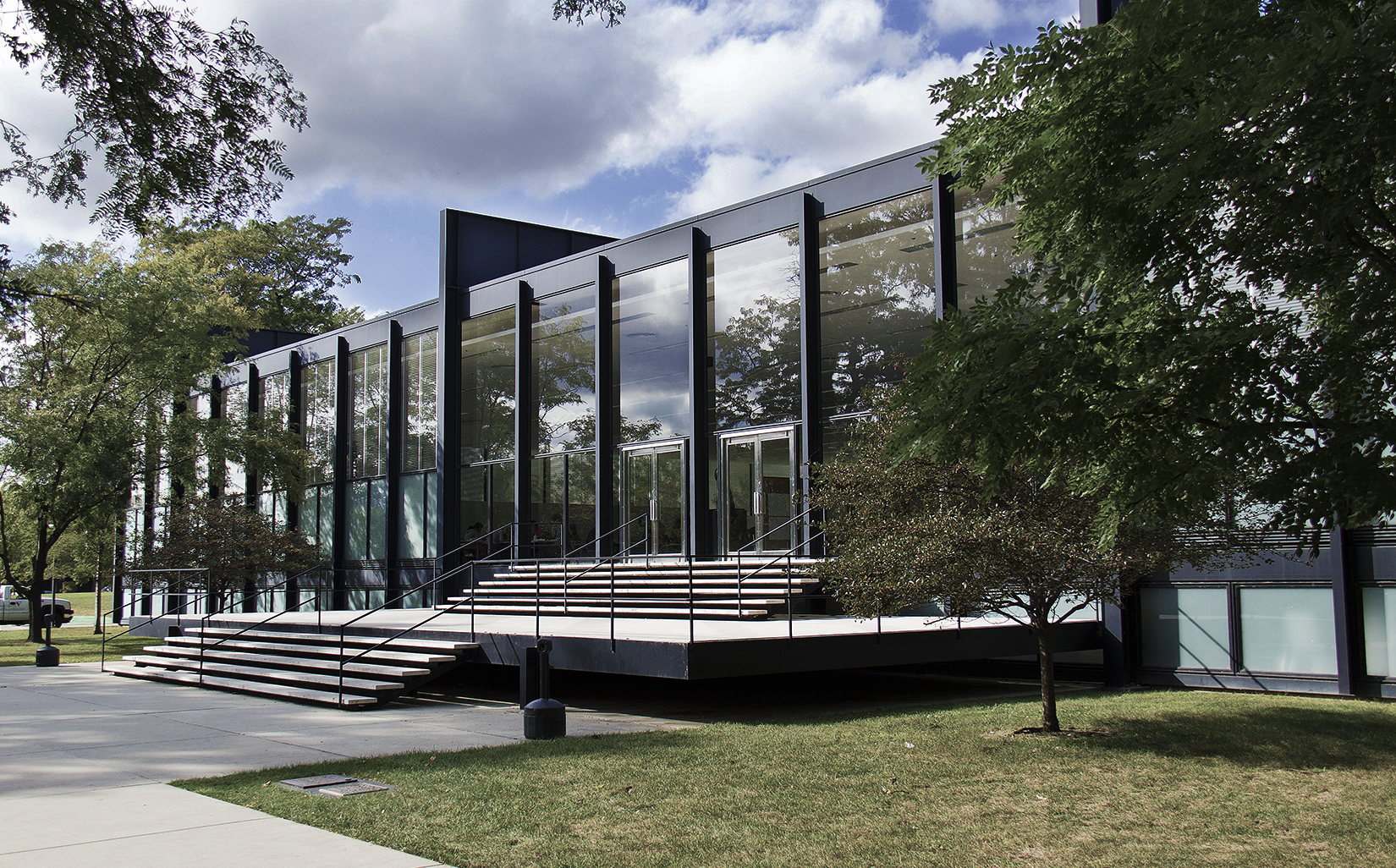
Crown Hall at Illinois Institute of Technology

Mies's first US commission was the interior of Philip Johnson's New York apartment, in 1930.

Starting in 1930, Mies served as the last director of the Bauhaus, at the request of his colleague and competitor Gropius. In 1932, the Nazis forced the state-sponsored school to leave its campus in Dessau and Mies moved it to an abandoned telephone factory in Berlin. In April 1933, the school was raided by the Gestapo and in July of that year, because the Nazis had made the continued operation of the school untenable, Mies and the faculty "voted" to close the Bauhaus.

Some of Mies's designs found favour with Adolf Hitler, such as his designs for autobahn service stations. Mies and Gropius both joined the visual arts section of the Reich Culture Chamber and entered early Nazi architectural competitions, with designs showing structures decorated with swastikas. Mies's design for a Reich Bank building in Berlin was one of six to receive a prize, although it was rejected by Hitler. Mies and Gropius wanted to be accepted by the Nazis and both signed an artists' manifesto supporting Hitler's succession to Hindenburg. Mies's Modernist designs of glass and steel were not considered suitable for state buildings by the Nazis and in 1937 or 1938 he reluctantly followed Gropius to the United States.

He accepted a residential commission in Wyoming and then an offer to head the department of architecture of the Armour Institute of Technology in Chicago. Mies was allowed to combine ideological conviction with commerce. Already in 1919 he had drawn up plans for an office glass tower. In New York he found investors for the Seagram Building, which was completed in 1958.

== Career in the United States ==
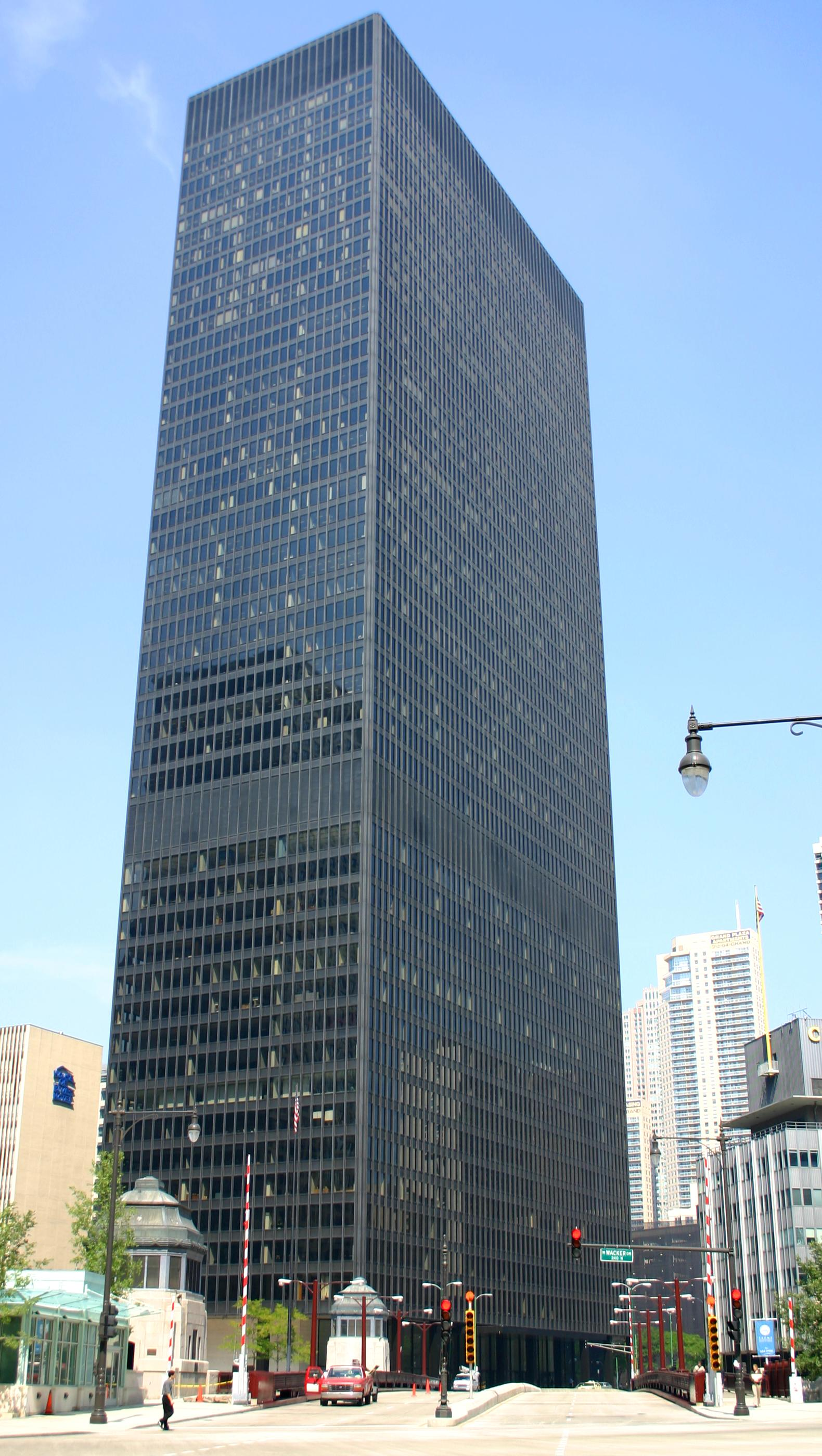
IBM Plaza, Chicago, Illinois

After being hired at the Armour Institute of Technology, Mies settled in Chicago, Illinois. When the Armour Institute merged with the Lewis Institute to form the Illinois Institute of Technology (IIT) in 1940, Mies remained on IIT's faculty to head its architecture department. He was hired to design the Illinois Institute of Technology Academic Campus's new buildings and master plan. All his buildings still stand there, including Alumni Hall, the Carr Memorial Chapel, and his masterpiece the S.R. Crown Hall, built as the home of IIT's School of Architecture.

In 1944, he became an US citizen, completing his severance from his native Germany. His thirty years as an US architect reflect a more structural, pure approach toward achieving his goal of a new architecture for the twentieth century. He focused his efforts on enclosing open and adaptable "universal" spaces with clearly arranged structural frameworks, featuring prefabricated steel shapes filled in with large sheets of glass.

His early projects at the IIT campus, and for developer Herbert Greenwald, presented to Americans a style that seemed a natural progression of the almost forgotten nineteenth century Chicago School style. His architecture, with origins in the German Bauhaus and western European International Style, became an accepted mode of building for American cultural and educational institutions, developers, public agencies, and large corporations.

== Notable buildings ==
=== Chicago Federal Complex ===
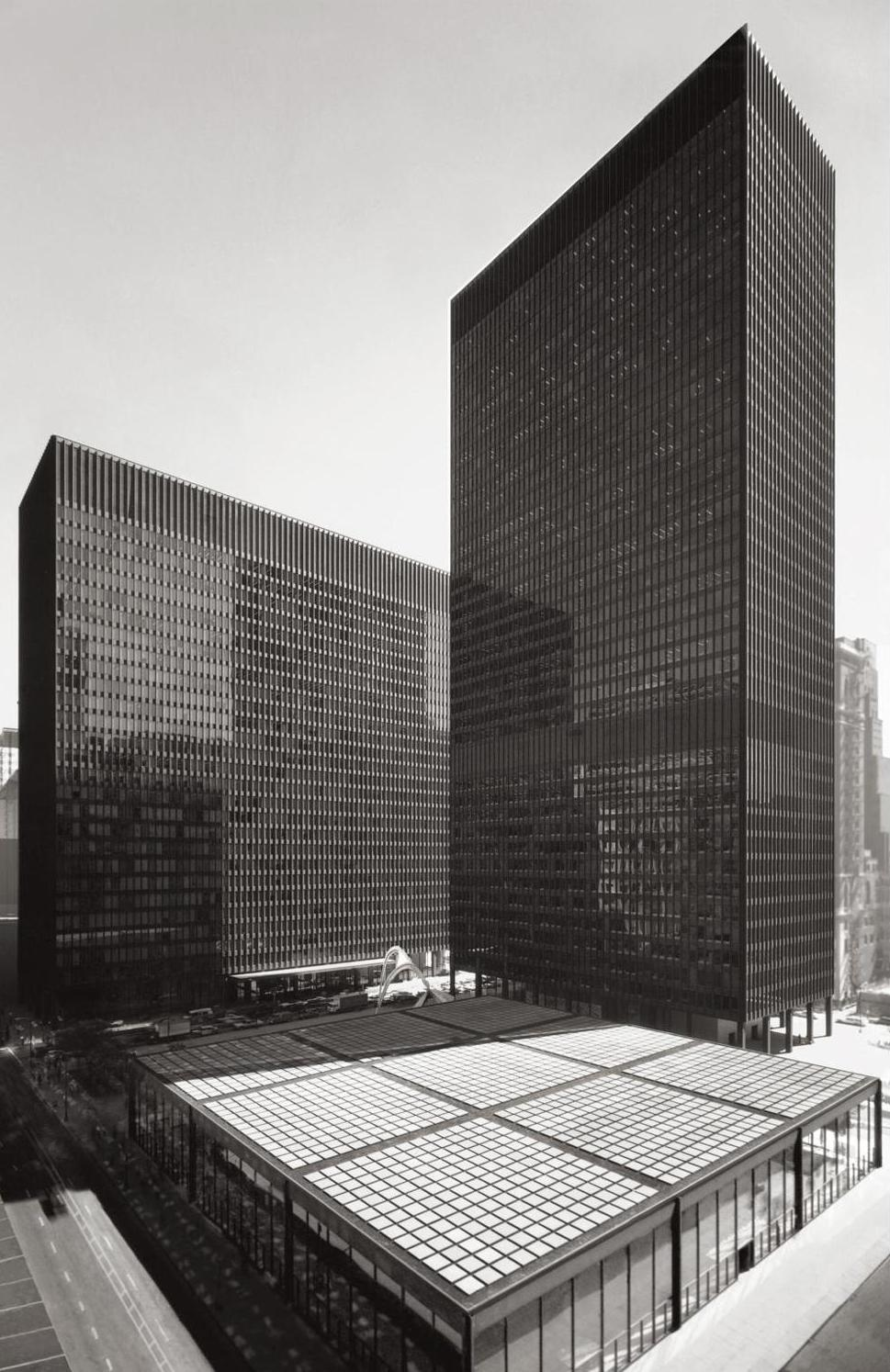
Chicago Federal Center, built 1964–1974

Chicago Federal Center Plaza, also known as Chicago Federal Plaza, unified three buildings of varying scales: the mid-rise Everett McKinley Dirksen United States Courthouse, the high-rise John C. Kluczynski Building, and the single-story Post Office building. The complex's plot area extends over two blocks; a one-block site, bounded by Jackson, Clark, Adams, and Dearborn streets, contains the Kluczynski Federal Building and U.S. Post Office Loop Station, while a parcel on an adjacent block to the east contains the Dirksen U.S. Courthouse. The structural framing of the buildings is formed of high-tensile bolted steel and concrete. The exterior curtain walls are defined by projecting steel I-beam mullions covered with flat black graphite paint, characteristic of Mies's designs. The balance of the curtain walls are of bronze-tinted glass panes, framed in shiny aluminum, and separated by steel spandrels, also covered with flat black graphite paint. The entire complex is organized on a 8.5 m (28 ft) grid pattern subdivided into six 1.4 m (4 ft 8 in) modules. This pattern extends from the granite-paved plaza into the ground-floor lobbies of the two tower buildings with the grid lines continuing vertically up the buildings and integrating each component of the complex. Associated architects that have played a role in the complex's long history from 1959 to 1974 include Schmidt, Garden & Erickson; C.F. Murphy Associates; and A. Epstein & Sons.

=== Edith Farnsworth House ===
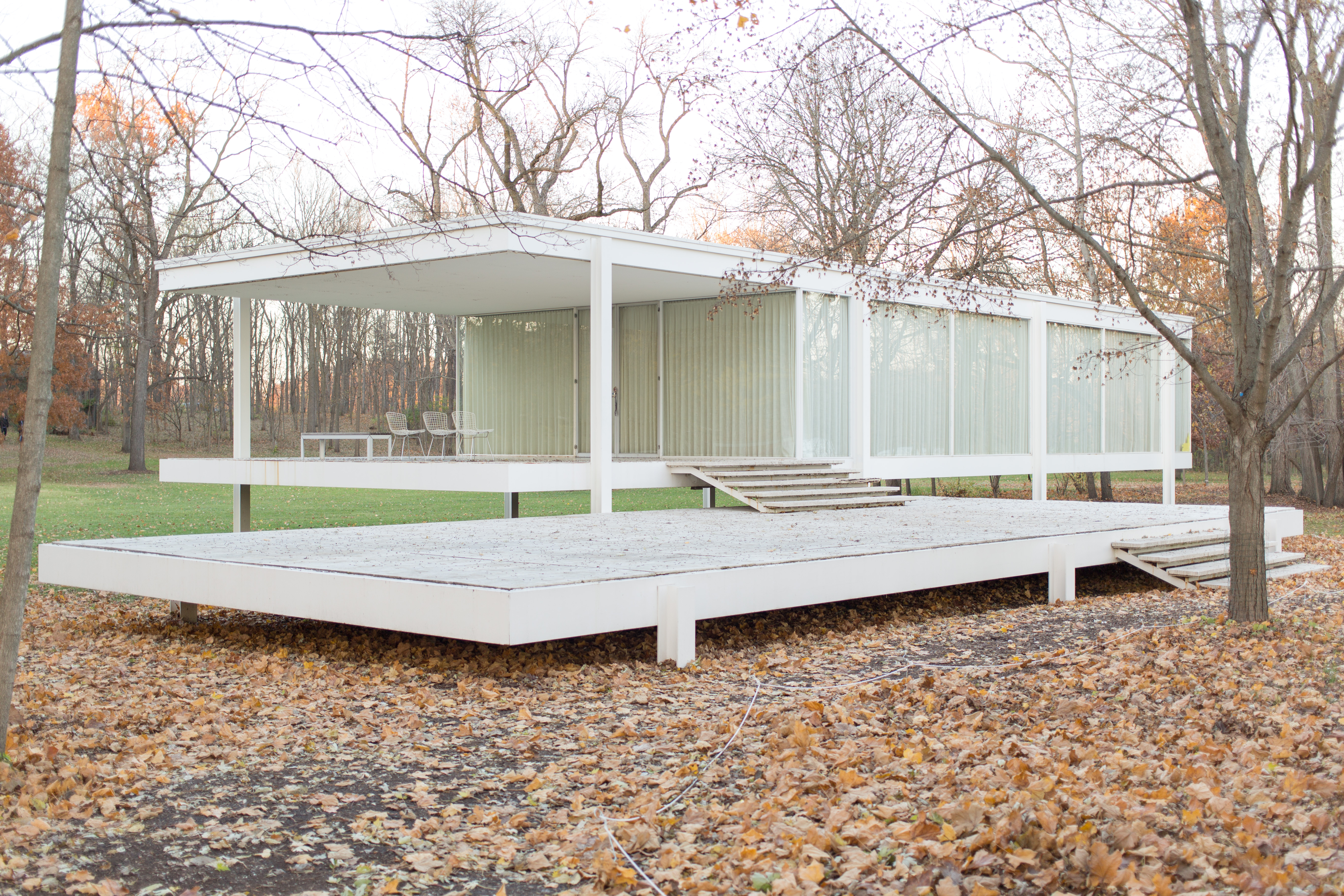
Edith Farnsworth House (1946–1951)

Between 1946 and 1951, Mies van der Rohe designed and built the Edith Farnsworth House, a weekend retreat outside Chicago for an independent professional woman, Dr. Edith Farnsworth. Here, Mies explored the relationship between people, shelter, and nature. The glass pavilion is raised six feet above a floodplain next to the Fox River, surrounded by forest and rural prairies.

The house took a while to be built due to the underlying issues between Mies and Edith Farnsworth. There was a complex relationship between the two for a variety of reasons, some related to personal feelings and others to design considerations. Back and forth legal disputes led to these ongoing issues despite the beautiful outcome of the design.

The highly crafted pristine white structural frame and all-glass walls define a simple rectilinear interior space, allowing nature and light to envelop the interior space. A wood-paneled fireplace (also housing mechanical equipment, kitchen, and toilets) is positioned within the open space to suggest living, dining and sleeping spaces without using walls. No partitions touch the surrounding all-glass enclosure. Without solid exterior walls, full-height draperies on a perimeter track allow freedom to provide full or partial privacy when and where desired. The house has been described as sublime, a temple hovering between heaven and earth, a poem, a work of art.

The Edith Farnsworth House and its 240,000 m^{2} (60 acres) wooded site was purchased at auction for US$7.5 million by preservation groups in 2004 and is now owned and operated by the National Trust for Historic Preservation as a public museum. The building influenced the creation of hundreds of modernist glass houses, most notably the Glass House by Philip Johnson, located near New York City and also now owned by the National Trust.

=== 860–880 Lake Shore Drive, Chicago ===
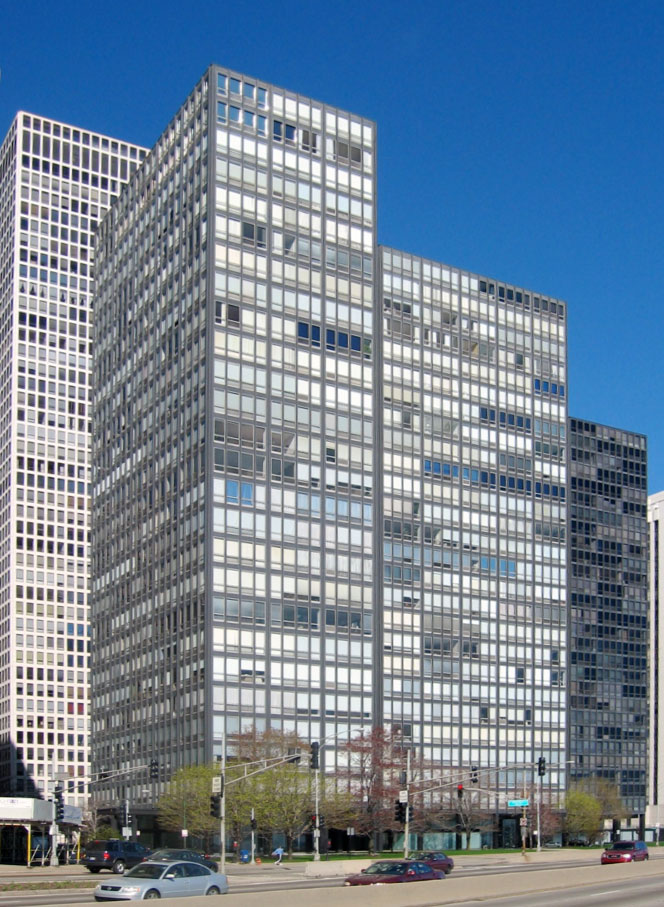
860–880 Lake Shore Drive, Chicago, Illinois (1949–1951)

The 860–880 Lake Shore Drive Apartments were built between 1948 and 1951 and came to define postwar US Modernism. These towers, with façades of steel and glass, were radical departures from the typical residential brick apartment buildings.

Mies designed a series of four middle-income high-rise apartment buildings for developer Herbert Greenwald. The towers were simple rectangular boxes with a non-hierarchical wall enclosure, raised on stilts above a glass-enclosed lobby. The lobby is set back from the perimeter columns, which were exposed around the perimeter of the building above, creating a modern colonnade. This configuration created a feeling of light, openness, and freedom of movement at the ground level that became the prototype for countless new high rises designed both by Mies's office and his followers.

=== Seagram Building, New York City ===
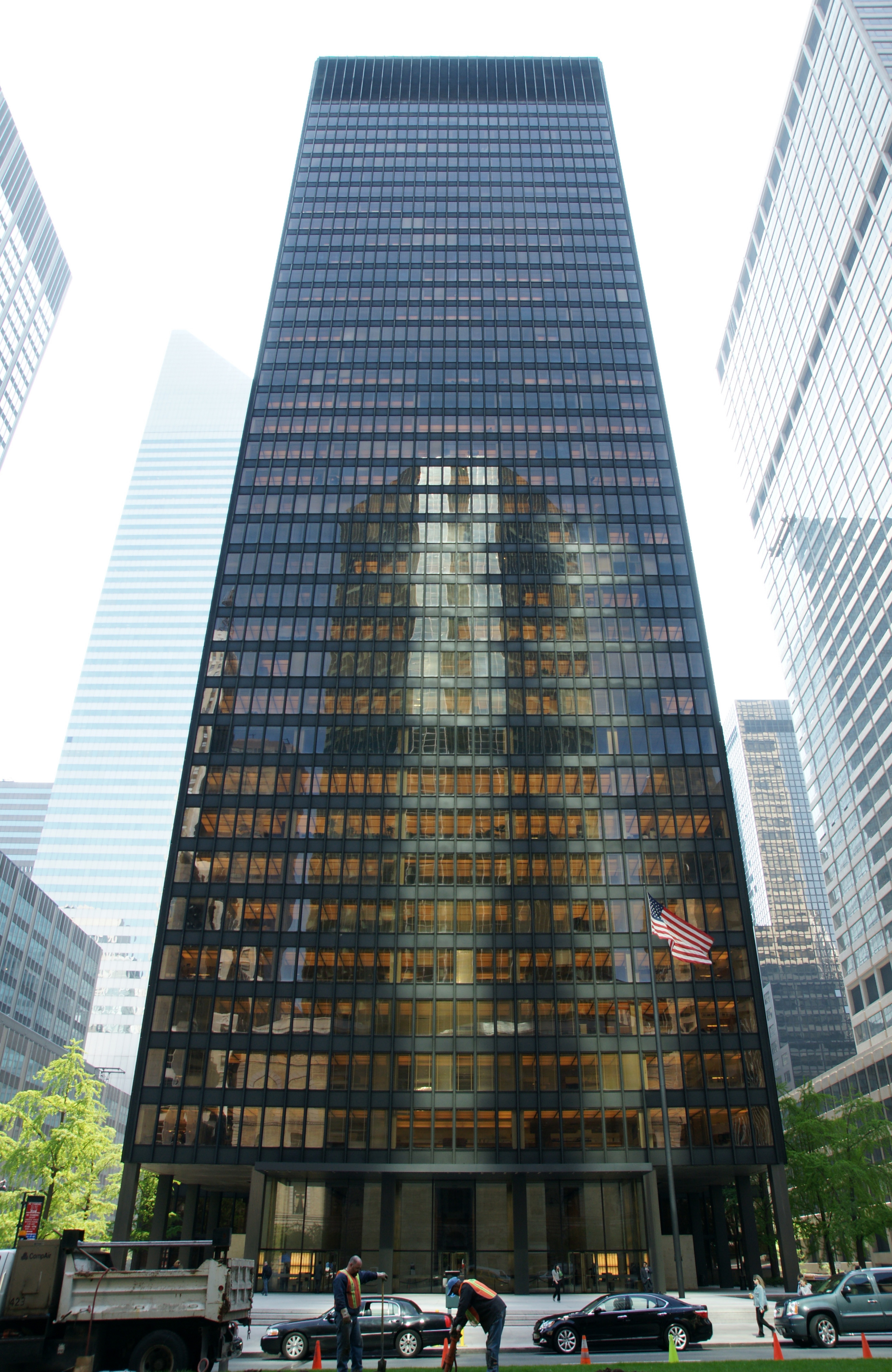
Seagram Building

Although now acclaimed and widely influential as an urban design feature, Mies had to convince Seagram officials that a taller tower with significant "unused" open space at ground level would enhance the presence and prestige of the building. Mies's design included a bronze curtain wall with external H-shaped mullions that were exaggerated in depth beyond what was structurally necessary. Detractors criticized it as having committed Adolf Loos's "crime of ornamentation". Philip Johnson had a role in interior materials selections, and he designed the sumptuous Four Seasons Restaurant. The Seagram Building is said to be an early example of the innovative "fast-track" construction process, where design documentation and construction are done concurrently.

=== McCormick House ===
During 1951–1952, Mies designed the steel, glass, and brick McCormick House, located in Elmhurst, Illinois (18 miles west of the Chicago Loop), for real-estate developer Robert Hall McCormick, Jr. A one-story adaptation of the exterior curtain wall of his famous 860–880 Lake Shore Drive towers, it served as a prototype for an unbuilt series of speculative houses to be constructed in Melrose Park, Illinois. The house has since been relocated and reconfigured as a part of the Elmhurst Art Museum.

=== Museum of Fine Arts, Houston ===
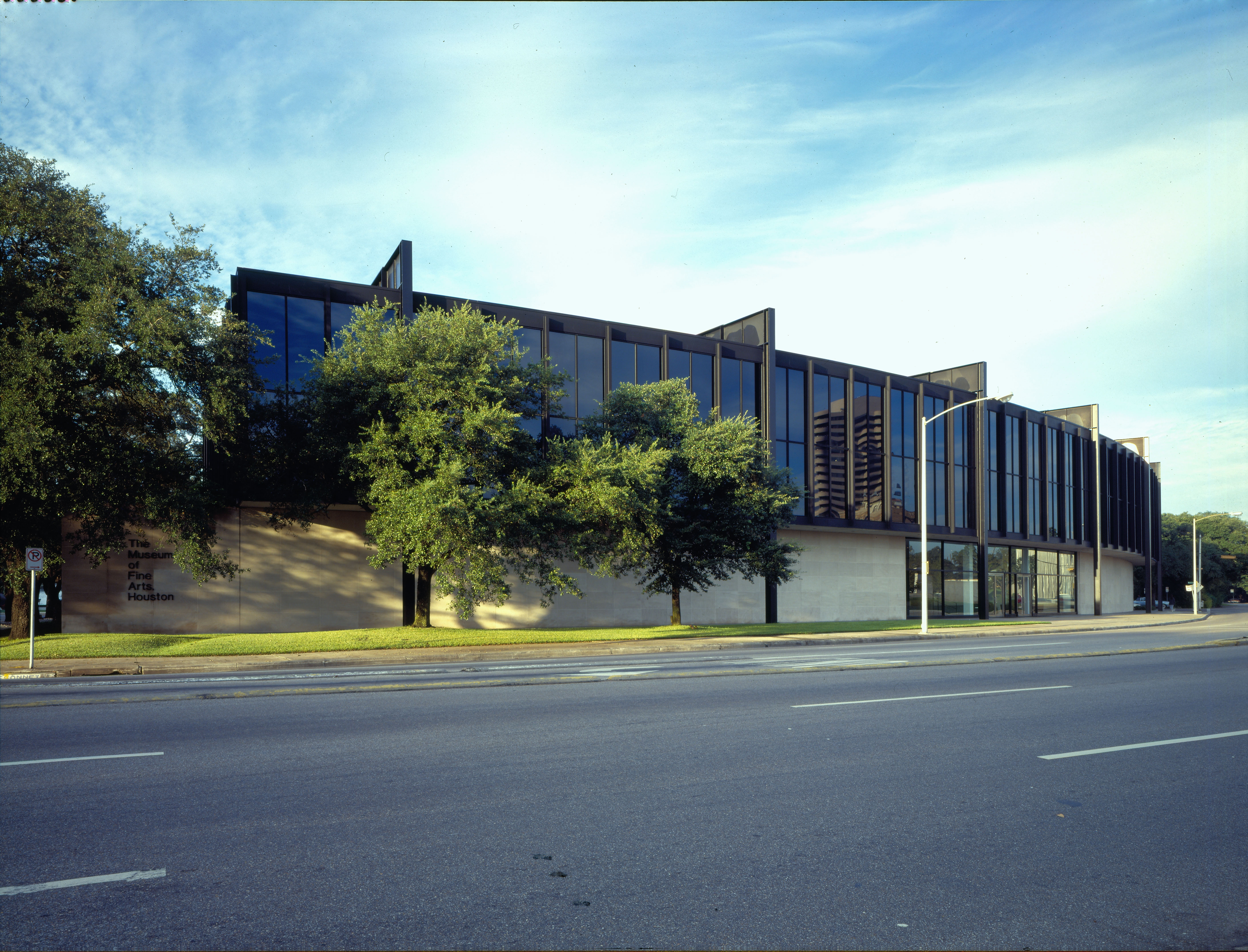
Caroline Wiess Law Building of the Museum of Fine Arts, Houston, Texas

Mies designed two buildings for the Museum of Fine Arts, Houston (MFAH) as additions to the Caroline Wiess Law Building. In 1953, the MFAH commissioned Mies van der Rohe to create a master plan for the institution. He designed two additions to the building—Cullinan Hall, completed in 1958, and the Brown Pavilion, completed in 1974. A renowned example of the International Style, these portions of the Caroline Wiess Law Building comprise one of only two Mies-designed museums in the world.

=== Two buildings in Baltimore, MD ===
The One Charles Center, built in 1962, is a 23-story aluminum and glass building that heralded the beginning of Baltimore's downtown modern buildings. The Highfield House, just to the northeast of the Johns Hopkins Homewood campus, was built in 1964 as a rental apartment building. The 15-story concrete tower became a residential condominium building in 1979. Both buildings are now on the National Register of Historic Places.

=== National Gallery, Berlin ===
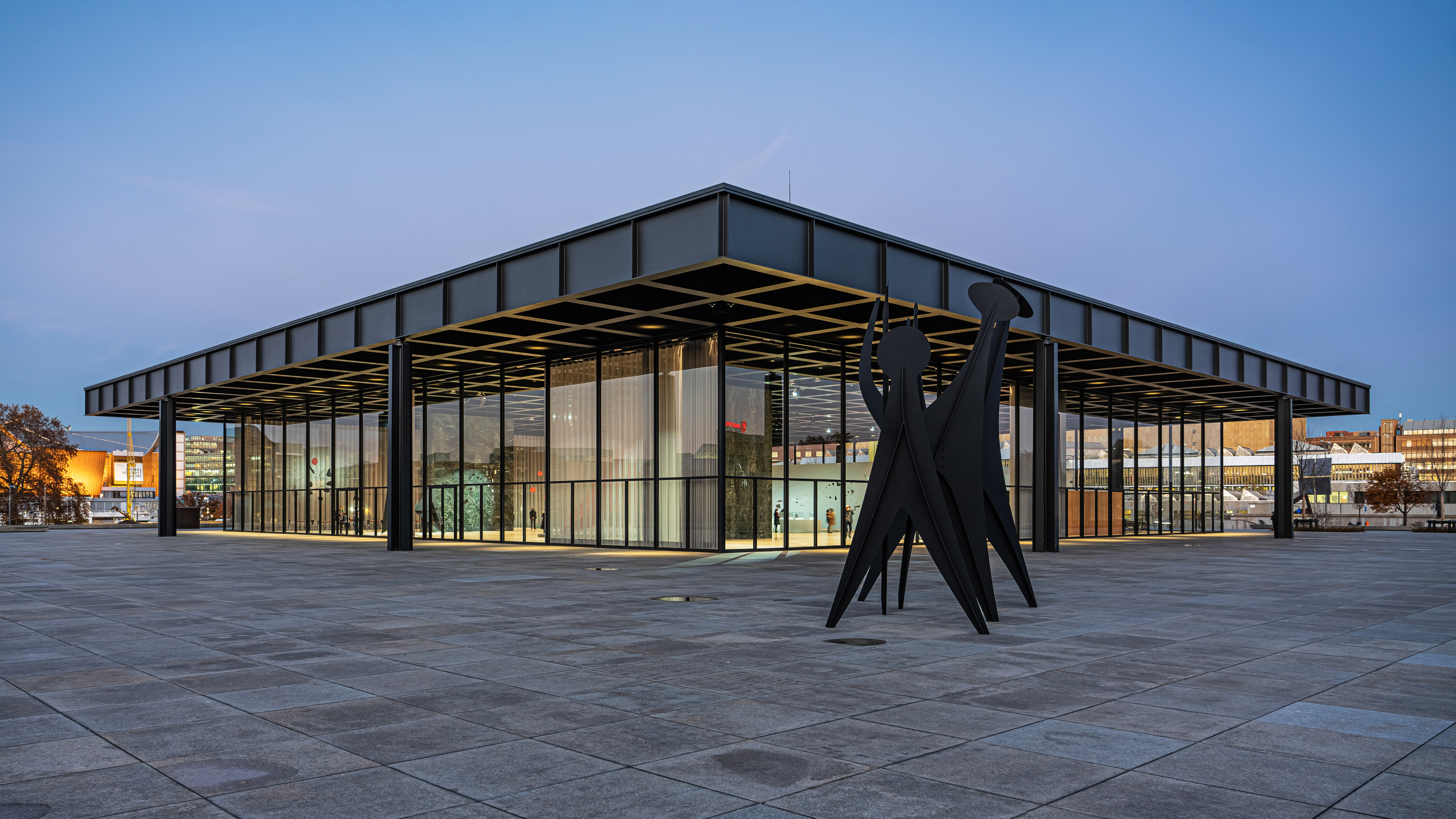
Neue Nationalgalerie, Berlin

Mies's last work was the Neue Nationalgalerie art museum, the New National Gallery for the Berlin National Gallery. Considered one of the most perfect statements of his architectural approach, the upper pavilion is a precise composition of monumental steel columns and a cantilevered (overhanging) roof plane with a glass enclosure. The simple square glass pavilion is a powerful expression of his ideas about flexible interior space, defined by transparent walls and supported by an external structural frame.

=== Mies Building at Indiana University in Bloomington, Indiana ===
In 1952, a fraternity commissioned Mies to design a building on the Indiana University campus in Bloomington, Indiana. The plan was not realized during his lifetime, but the design was rediscovered in 2013, and in 2019 the university's Eskenazi School of Art, Architecture + Design announced they would be constructing it with blessing of his grandchildren. As of June 2022, the building is completed and open.

=== Martin Luther King Jr. Memorial Library, Washington DC ===
Mies designed Martin Luther King Jr. Memorial Library in Washington, DC. The building was completed in 1972 at a cost of $18 million and three years after Mies's death. It is the central facility of the District of Columbia Public Library (DCPL), and is his only realized library and his only building in Washington D.C.

== Furniture ==
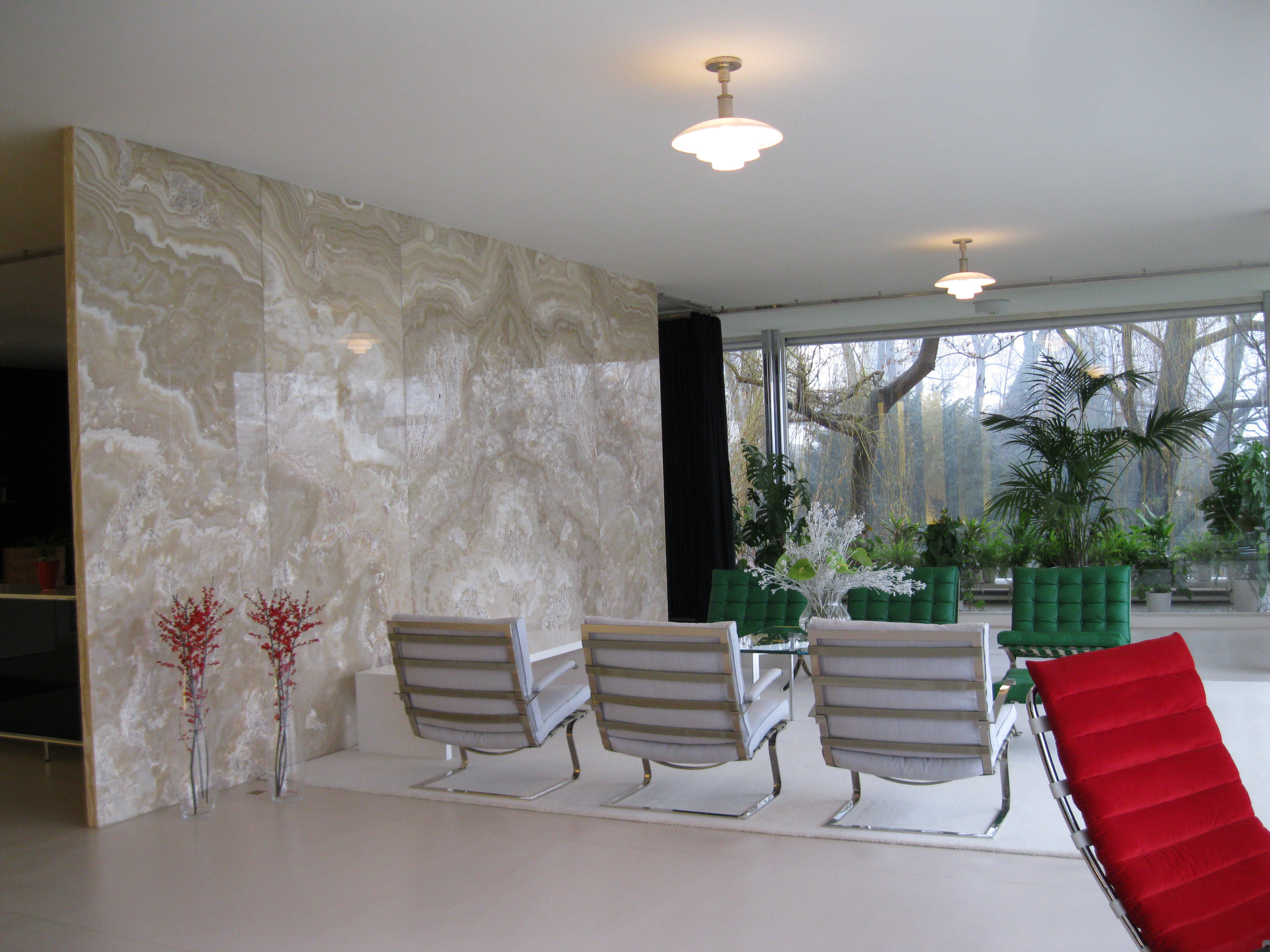
Furniture in the Tugendhat House, including Tugendhat chairs

Mies, often in collaboration with Lilly Reich, designed modern furniture pieces using new industrial technologies that have become popular classics, such as the Barcelona chair and table, the Brno chair, and the Tugendhat chair. These pieces are manufactured under licence by the Knoll furniture company.

His furniture is known for fine craftsmanship, a mixture of traditional luxurious fabrics like leather combined with modern chrome frames, and a distinct separation of the supporting structure and the supported surfaces, often employing cantilevers to enhance the feeling of lightness created by delicate structural frames.

== Educator ==
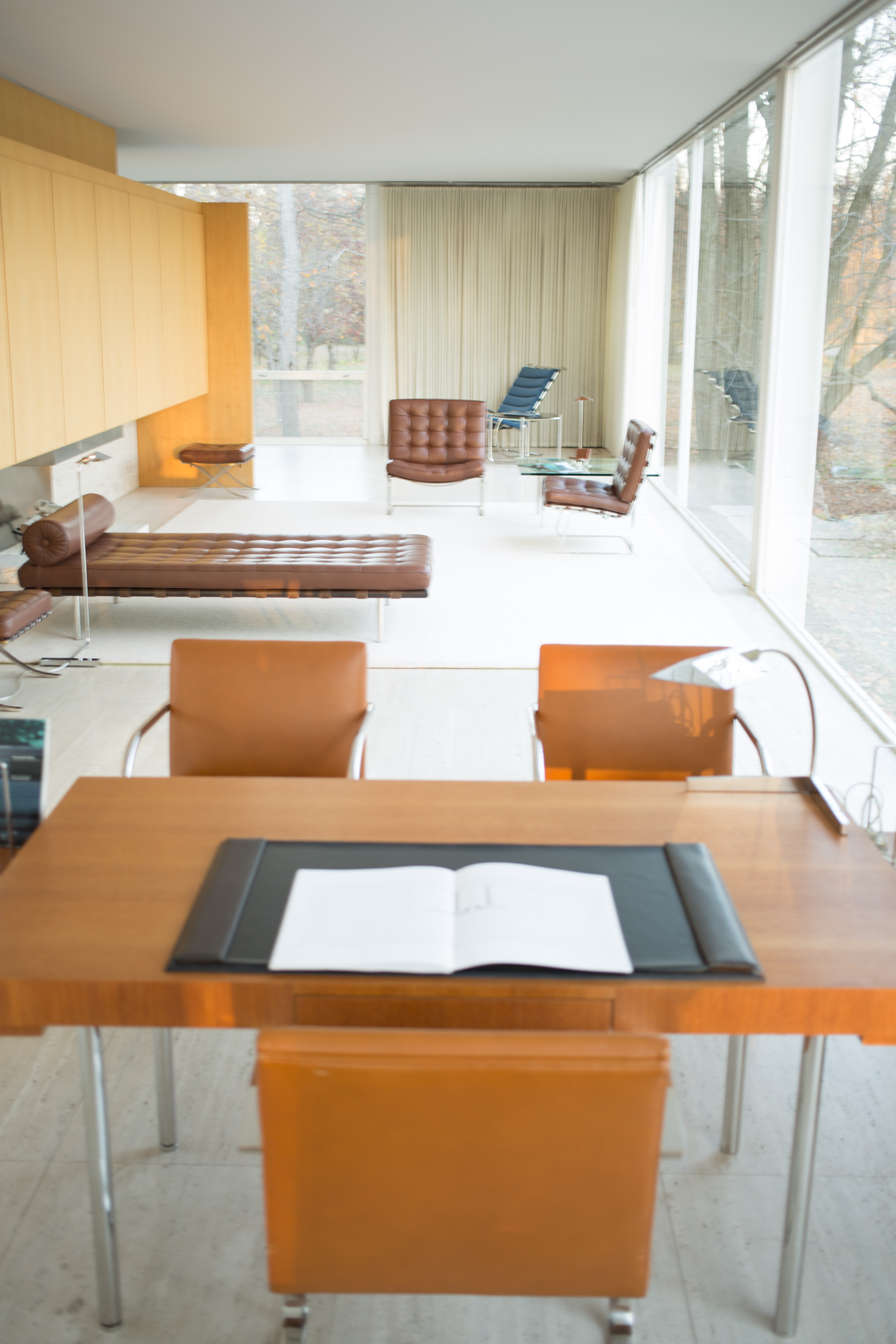
Interior of Farnsworth House

In 1953, the House Beautiful editor Elizabeth Gordon published an editorial under the title "The Threat to the Next America". In it, she criticized Mies's Villa Tugendhat as cold, barren design and dismissed Mies as European Architect.

Mies served as the last director of Bauhaus, and then headed the department of architecture, Illinois Institute of Technology in Chicago, where he developed the Second Chicago School. He played a significant role as an educator, believing his architectural language could be learned, then applied to design any type of modern building. He set up a new education at the department of architecture of the Illinois Institute of Technology in Chicago, replacing the traditional Ecole des Beaux-Art curriculum with a three-step-education beginning with crafts of drawing and construction leading to planning skills and finishing with theory of architecture. He worked personally and intensively on prototype solutions, and then allowed his students, both in school and his office, to develop derivative solutions for specific projects under his guidance.

Mies placed great importance on education of architects who could carry on his design principles. He devoted a great deal of time and effort leading the architecture program at Illinois Institute of Technology. Peter Seidel was under his mentorship during his time in the institute.

Mies served on the initial Advisory Board of the Graham Foundation in Chicago. His own work as architect focused on intensive personal involvement in design efforts to create prototype solutions for building types.

== Death and legacy ==
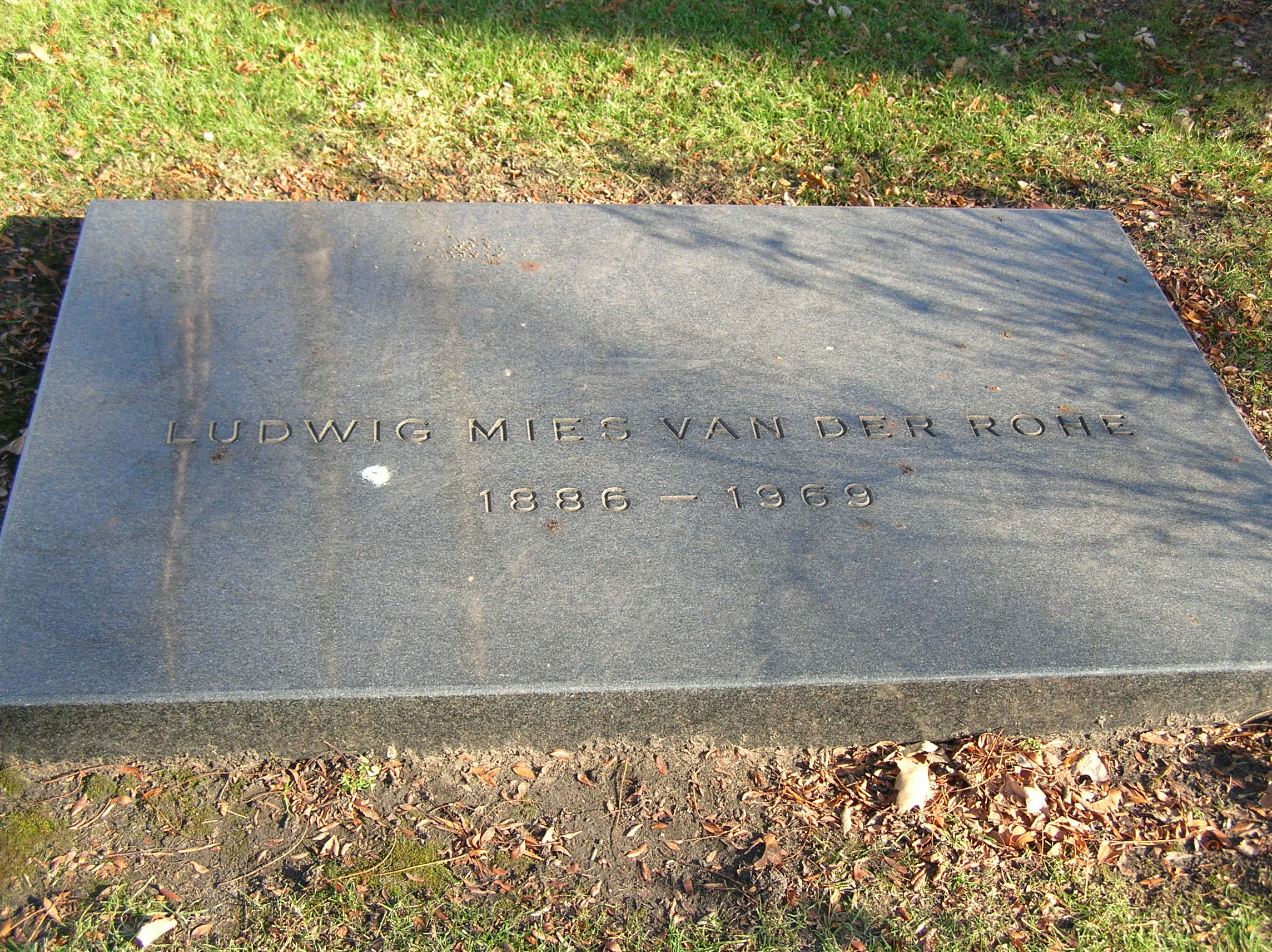
Mies's grave marker in Graceland Cemetery

In 1961, a program at Columbia University's School of Architecture celebrated the four great founders of contemporary architecture: Le Corbusier, Walter Gropius, Ludwig Mies van der Rohe, and Frank Lloyd Wright. It included addresses by Le Corbusier and Gropius as well as an interview with Mies. Discussion focused upon philosophies of design, aspects of their various architectural projects, and the juncture of architecture and city planning.

Technological advances in the manufacturing of architectural glass generated renewed interest in Mies's 1922 designs for a high-rise block on Friedrichstrasse in Berlin. Mies's Farnsworth House in Plano Illinois became a recurrent theme in 20th century architecture because it resembled a glass house. Technological limits meant that Mies's vision for a "skin and bones" architecture, where the steel frame was exposed internally and externally could never be fully realized. Mies also inspired the minimalism movement which fused Japanese architecture with Zen gardens.

In 1956 Mies received an honorary doctorate from North Carolina State University. In 1963, he was awarded the US Presidential Medal of Freedom.

Mies died on August 17, 1969, from esophageal cancer caused by his smoking habit. After cremation, his ashes were buried near Chicago's other famous architects in Chicago's Graceland Cemetery. His grave is marked by an intentionally unadorned, clean-line black slab of polished granite.

While Mies's work had enormous influence and critical recognition, his approach failed to sustain a creative force as a style after his death. In 1966 Robert Venturi coined the post-modern motto "less is a bore" as countervision to Mies's motto "less is more". By the 1980s, Mies's style was eclipsed by a new wave of modernism and post-modernism. This new style of architecture is evident in the buildings designed by Kevin Roche and Peter Roesch, Mies's students at IIT in Chicago.

== Archives ==
The Ludwig Mies van der Rohe Archive, an administratively independent section of the Museum of Modern Art's department of architecture and design, was established in 1968 by the museum's trustees. It was founded in response to the architect's desire to bequeath his entire work to the museum. The archive consists of about nineteen thousand drawings and prints, one thousand of which are by the German designer and architect Lilly Reich (1885–1947), Mies van der Rohe's close collaborator from 1927 to 1937; of written documents (primarily, the business correspondence) covering nearly the entire career of the architect; of photographs of buildings, models, and furniture; and of audiotapes, books, and periodicals.

Archival materials are also held by the Ryerson & Burnham Libraries at the Art Institute of Chicago. The Ludwig Mies van der Rohe Collection, 1929–1969 (bulk 1948–1960) includes correspondence, articles, and materials related to his association with the Illinois Institute of Technology. The Ludwig Mies van der Rohe Metropolitan Structures Collection, 1961–1969, includes scrapbooks and photographs documenting Chicago projects.

Other archives are held at the University of Illinois Chicago (personal book collection), the Canadian Centre for Architecture (drawings and photos) in Montreal, the Newberry Library in Chicago (personal correspondence), and at the Library of Congress in Washington D.C. (professional correspondence).

== Tributes ==
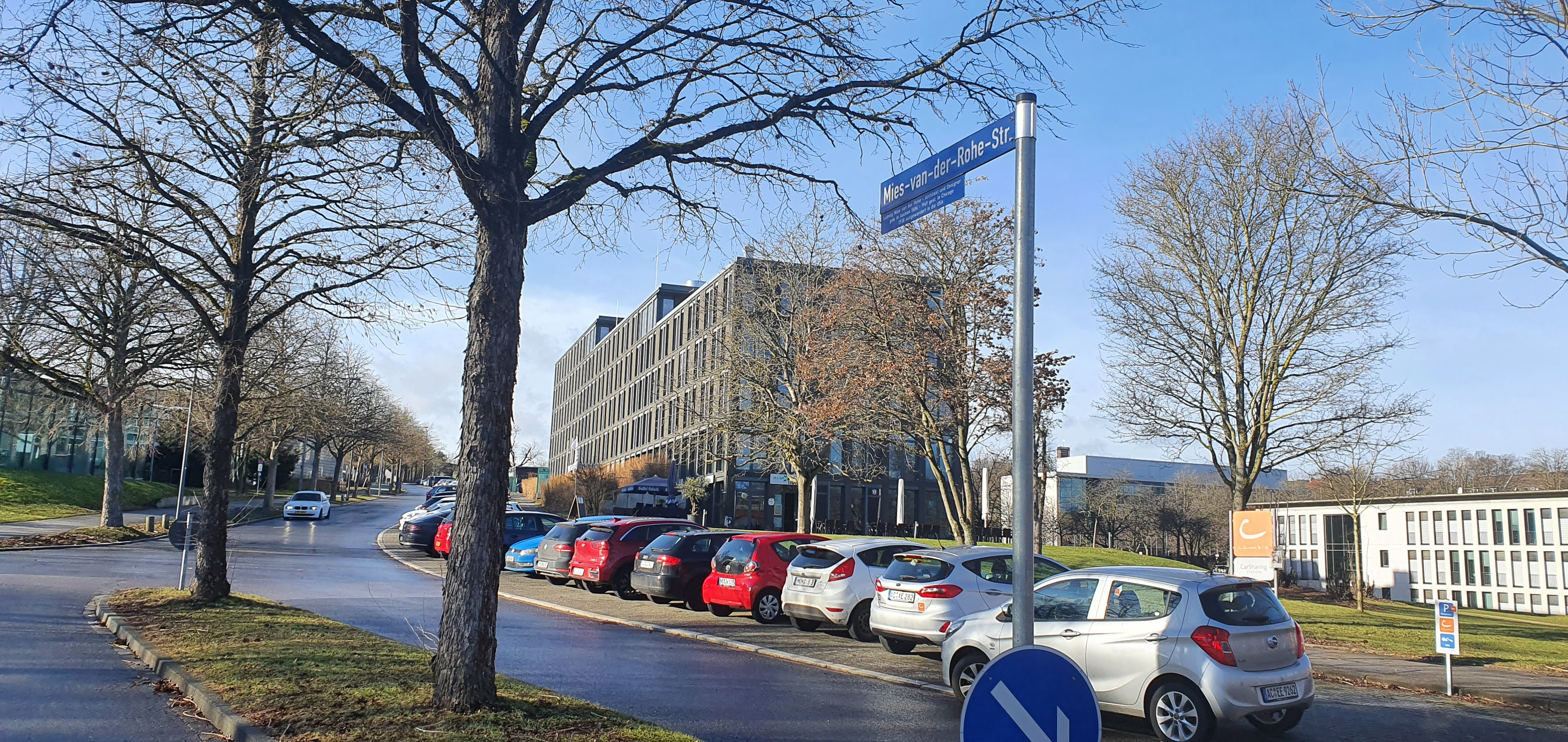
Mies-van-der Rohe-Straße in Aachen (February 2021)

There is a street named after him in his birth town of Aachen known as Mies-van-der Rohe-Straße.

Mies van der Rohe was a partial inspiration for the character of László Tóth in Brady Corbet's film The Brutalist.

== List of works ==
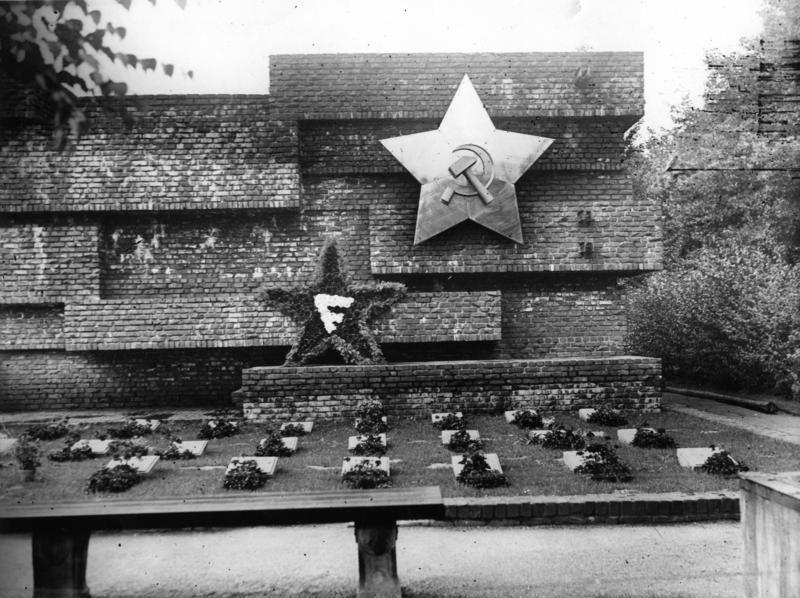
A memorial to the assassinated Spartacist revolutionary leaders Karl Liebknecht and Rosa Luxemburg, commissioned by Eduard Fuchs, president of the German Communist Party in Germany designed by Ludwig Mies van der Rohe, built by Wilhelm Pieck, and inaugurated on June 13, 1926, later destroyed by the Nazis

Early career in Europe (1907–1938)

- 1908 Riehl House – Residential home, Potsdam, Germany
- 1911 Perls House – Residential home, Zehlendorf
- 1913 Werner House – Residential home, Zehlendorf
- 1917 Urbig House – Residential home, Potsdam
- 1922 Kempner House – Residential home, Charlottenburg
- 1922 Eichstaedt House – Residential home, Wannsee
- 1922 Feldmann House – Residential home, Wilmersdorf
- 1923 Ryder House – Residential home, Wiesbaden
- 1925 Villa Wolf – Residential home, Guben
- 1926 Mosler House – Residential home, Babelsberg
- 1926 November Revolution Monument – Monument dedicated to Karl Liebknecht and Rosa Luxemburg, Zentralfriedhof Friedrichsfelde, Berlin
- 1927 Afrikanische Straße Apartments – Multi-Family Residential, Berlin, Germany
- 1927 Weissenhof Estate – Housing Exhibition coordinated by Mies and with a contribution by him, Stuttgart
- 1928 Haus Lange and Haus Esters – Residential home and an art museum, Krefeld
- 1929 Barcelona Pavilion – World's Fair Pavilion, Barcelona, Spain
- 1930 Villa Tugendhat – Residential home, Brno, Czechia, designated a World Heritage Site by UNESCO in 2001
- 1930 Verseidag Factory – Dyeing and HE Silk Mill building Krefeld, Germany
- 1932 Lemke House – Residential home, Weissensee

Buildings after emigration to the United States (1939–1960)

- 1939–1958 – Illinois Institute of Technology Campus Master Plan, academic campus & buildings, Chicago, Illinois
- 1949 Promontory Apartments – Residential apartment complex, Chicago, Illinois
- 1951 Sheridan-Oakdale Apartments (2933 N Sheridan Rd ) – Residential apartment complex, Chicago, Illinois
- 1951 Lake Shore Drive Apartments – Residential apartment towers, Chicago
- 1951 Algonquin Apartments – Residential apartments, Chicago, Illinois
- 1951 Farnsworth House – Vacation home, Plano, Illinois
- 1952 Arts Club of Chicago Interior Renovation – Art gallery, demolished in 1997, Chicago, Illinois
- 1952 Robert H. McCormick House – Residential home, relocated to the Elmhurst Art Museum, Elmhurst, Illinois
- 1954 Cullinan Hall – Museum of Fine Arts, Houston
- 1956 Crown Hall, Illinois Institute of Technology College of Architecture – Academic building, Chicago, Illinois
- 1956 900–910 North Lake Shore (Esplanade Apartments) – Residential apartment complex, Chicago, Illinois
- 1957 Commonwealth Promenade Apartments (330–330 W Diversey Parkway) – Residential apartment complex, Chicago (1957)
- 1958 Seagram Building – Office tower, New York City, New York
- 1958 Caroline Wiess Law Building, Museum of Fine Art, Houston
- 1959 Home Federal Savings and Loan Association Building – Office building, Des Moines, Iowa
- 1959 Lafayette Park – Residential development, Detroit, Michigan.
- 1960 Pavilion and Colonnade Apartments– Residential complex, Newark, New Jersey

Late career Worldwide (1961–69)

- 1961 Bacardi Office Building – Office Building, Mexico City
- 1962 Tourelle-Sur-Rive – Residential apartment complex of three towers, Nuns' Island, Montreal, Quebec, Canada
- 1962 Home Federal Savings and Loan Association of Des Moines Building – Office Building, Des Moines, Iowa
- 1962 One Charles Center – Office Tower, Baltimore, Maryland
- 1963 2400 North Lakeview Apartments – Residential Apartment Complex, Chicago, Illinois
- 1963 Morris Greenwald House – Vacation Home, Weston, Connecticut
- 1964 Chicago Federal Center – Civic Complex, Chicago, Illinois
  - 1960–1964 Dirksen Federal Building – Office Tower, Chicago
  - Kluczynski Federal Building – Office Tower, Chicago
  - United States Post Office Loop Station – General Post Office, Chicago
- 1964 Highfield House, 4000 North Charles – Originally Rental Apartments, and now Condominium Apartments, Baltimore, Maryland
- 1965 Crown Family School of Social Work, Policy, and Practice – Academic Building Chicago, Illinois
- 1965 Richard King Mellon Hall – Duquesne University, Pittsburgh, PA
- 1965 Meredith Hall – School of Journalism and Mass Communication, Drake University, Des Moines, IA
- 1967 Westmount Square – Office & Residential Tower Complex, Westmount, Island of Montreal, Quebec, Canada
- 1968 Neue Nationalgalerie – Modern Art Museum, Berlin, Germany
- 1965–1968 Brown Pavilion, Museum of Fine Art, Houston
- 1967–1969 Toronto-Dominion Centre – Office Tower Complex, Toronto, Ontario, Canada
- 1969 Filling station – Nuns' Island, Montreal, Quebec, Canada (closed)
- 1970 One Illinois Center – Office Tower, Chicago, Illinois (completed posthumously)
- 1972 Martin Luther King Jr. Memorial Library – District of Columbia Public Library, Washington, D.C. (completed posthumously)
- 1973 American Life Building – Louisville, Kentucky (completed after Mies's death by Bruno Conterato)
- 1973 330 North Wabash – Office Tower, Chicago (completed posthumously)

Buildings on the Illinois Institute of Technology Campus (1939–1958)

- 1943 Minerals & Metals Research Building – Research
- 1945 Engineering Research Building – Research
- 1946 Alumni Memorial Hall – Classroom
- 1946 Wishnick Hall – Classroom
- 1946 Perlstein Hall – Classroom
- 1950 I.I.T. Boiler Plant – Academic
- 1950 Institute of Gas Technology Building – Research
- 1950 American Association of Railroads Administration Building (now the College of Music Building) – Administration
- 1952 Mechanical Engineering Research Building I – Research
- 1952 Carr Memorial Chapel – Religious
- 1953 American Association of Railroads Mechanical Engineering Building – Research
- 1953 Carman Hall at IIT – Dormitory
- 1955 Cunningham Hall – Dormitory
- 1955 Bailey Hall – Dormitory
- 1955 I.I.T. Commons Building
- 1956 S. R. Crown Hall – Academic, College of Architecture
- 1957 Physics & Electrical Engineering Research Building – Research
- 1957 Siegel Hall – Classroom
- 1953 American Association of Railroads Laboratory Building – Research
- 1958 Metals Technology Building Extension – Research

== See also ==
- International style (architecture) – Modernist architectural style
- Mies van der Rohe Foundation – Public arts entity in Barcelona, Spain
