= Peter Seidel =

American architect-planner turned writer (1926–2025)

Federick George Peter Seidel
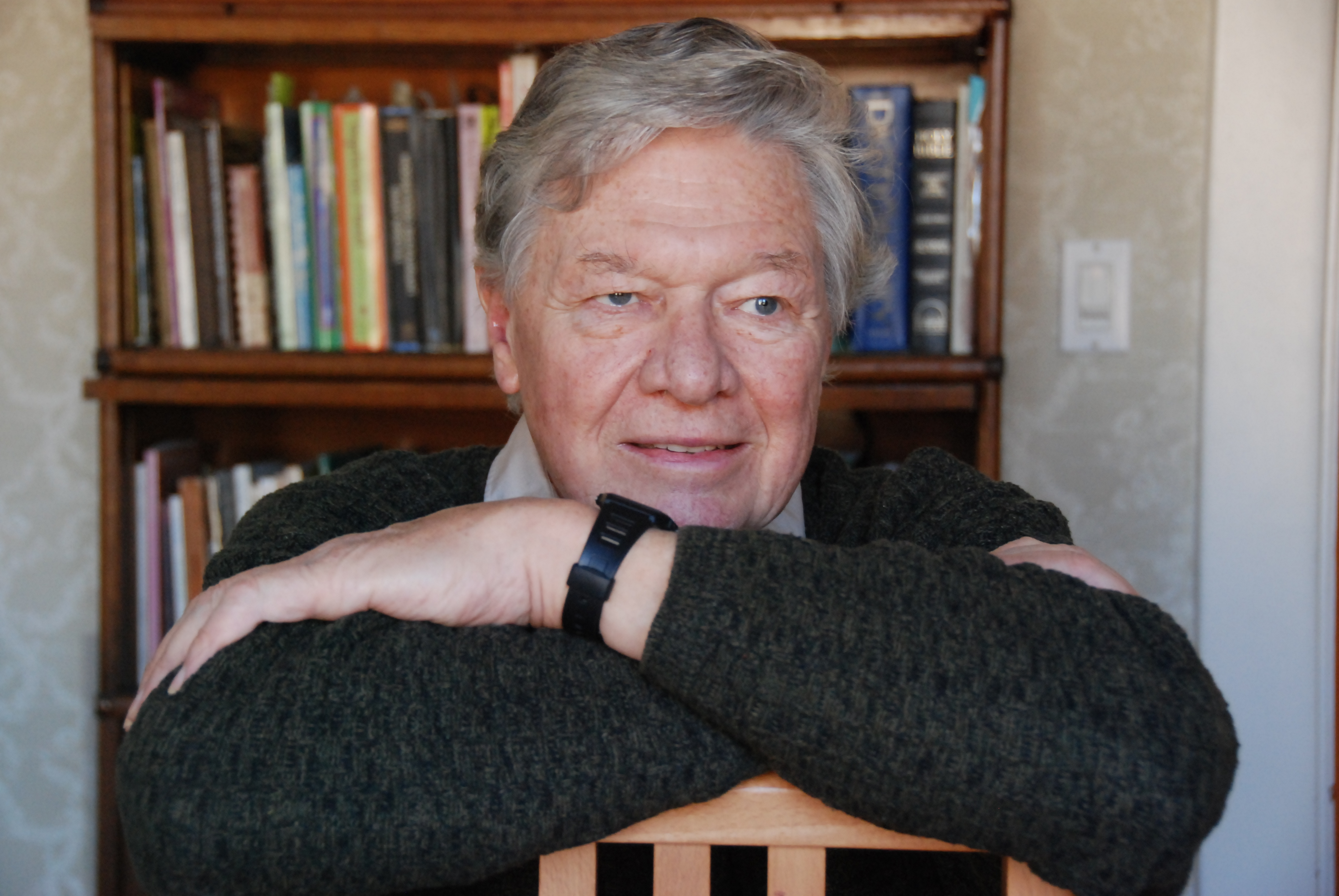
- Peter Seidel in 2023
- Born: December 2, 1926 (age 99); Milwaukee, Wisconsin, U.S.
- Occupations: Architect, Planner, Author

Federick George Peter Seidel, better known as Peter Seidel (December 2, 1926 – July 20, 2025) was an American architect-planner turned writer.

== Life and career ==
Seidel was born in Milwaukee, Wisconsin on December 2, 1926.

He moved from Ann Arbor, Michigan to Ohio to plan a new town outside of Cincinnati, Ohio. His plans for the new town never came to fruition, but he instead built an eco-community in Clermont County on 188 acres of land. Seidel's goal for this was a place where residents could get a feel of nature.

During that time, he obtained a Bachelor in Architectural Engineering from the University of Colorado, and after that obtained Masters in Architectural Planning from the Illinois Institute of Technology. Seidel studied under renowned architect Ludwig Mies van der Rohe while doing his Masters. After that, Seidel was on the faculty of the University of Michigan, then Virginia Tech. He also taught at the Central China Institute of Science and Technology.

After publishing his last book called 2145, Seidel retired in Northside, Cincinnati while donating his fund as part of his philanthropy, mainly to Center for the Advancement of the Steady State Economy (CASSE). He died on July 20, 2025, at the age of 98.

== Works ==
=== Books ===
- 1998, Invisible Walls: Why We Ignore the Damage We Inflict on the Planet ... and Ourselves. Amherst, New York: Prometheus Books. ISBN 1-57392-217-X
- 2006, Global Survival: The Challenge and its Implications For Thinking and Acting. edited with Ervin Laszlo. New York: Select Books. ISBN 1-59079-104-5
- 2009, 2045: A Story of Our Future. Amherst, New York: Prometheus Books. ISBN 978-1-59102-705-8
- 2020, Uncommon Sense: Shortcomings of the Human Mind for Handling Big-Picture, Long-Term Challenges. Arlington: Steady State Press.
- 2022, 2145: A Journey Into the Future. Arlington: Steady State Press. ISBN 978-1-7329933-3-4.
