= Highfield House Condominium =

Building in Baltimore, Maryland

- Highfield House
- U.S. National Register of Historic Places
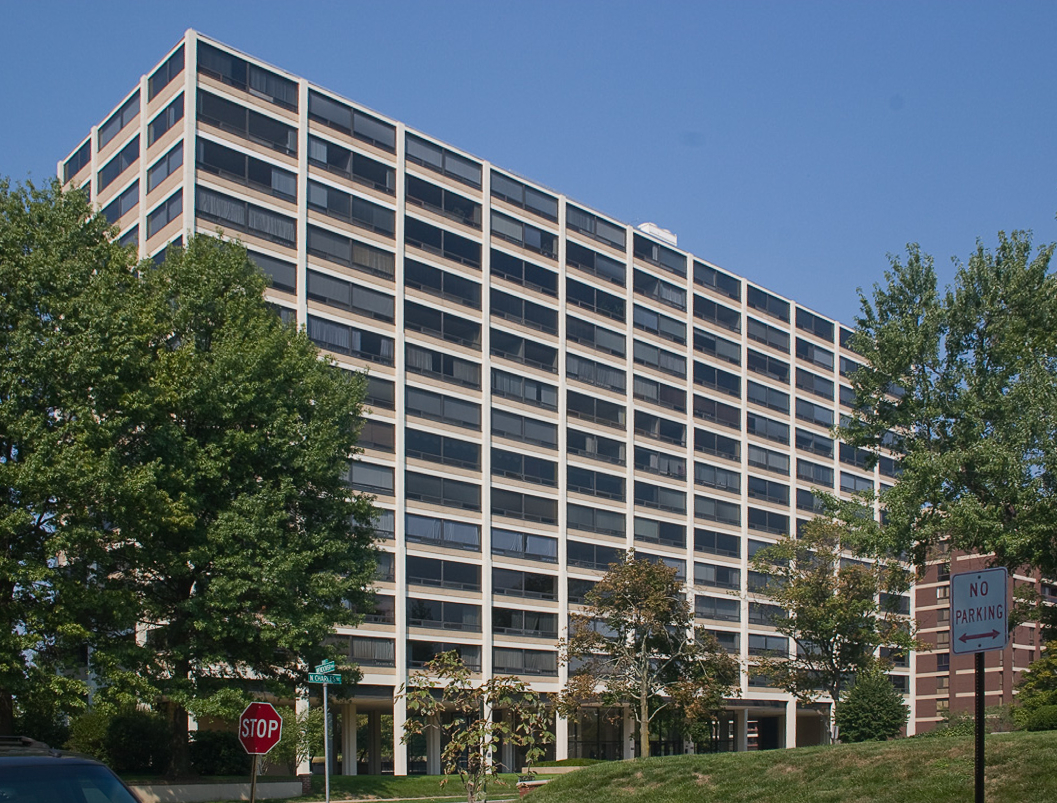
- Highfield House from the southeast

- Location within Baltimore Location within Maryland Location within the United States
- Location: 4000 N. Charles Street, Baltimore, Maryland, United States
- Coordinates: 39°20′17.3″N 76°37′7.6″W
- Built: 1964
- Architects: Ludwig Mies van der Rohe; Metropolitan Structures, Inc.
- Architectural style: International Style
- NRHP reference No.: 07000942
- Added to NRHP: September 12, 2007

Highfield House is a high-rise condominium in the Tuscany-Canterbury neighborhood of Baltimore, Maryland, United States. It was designed by Ludwig Mies van der Rohe and completed in 1964. It was the second of two buildings designed by Mies in Baltimore; One Charles Center was the first.

Highfield House was added to the National Register of Historic Places in 2007 as an outstanding example of International Style residential architecture.

Highfield House was featured in The Baltimore Modernism Project held at the D Center Baltimore in 2012. In October 2014, Highfield House celebrated its 50th anniversary by revealing a new plaque noting its addition to the National Register of Historic Places. Architectural plans for Highfield House are held in the Mies van der Rohe archives at the Museum of Modern Art. Artist Philip Tomaru has published a three-part series of artists' books about Highfield House held in the Museum of Modern Art Library.

== Architecture ==
Highfield House is a 15-story concrete tower facing east. Set on a platform, the main residential floors are 20 feet above the base. 36 columns frame an enclosed lobby and two equally sized areas of sheltered terrace to the north and south. The windows are made of dark gray tinted glass. Below each window is a brick panel. The use of brick decoration can also be seen in his buildings at IIT. To the rear of the building, a round, sunken swimming pool is surrounded by a landscaped garden and plaza.

== See also ==
- National Register of Historic Places listings in Baltimore
