= Bacardi Buildings (Miami) =

Set of buildings in Miami, Florida, USA

- Bacardi Complex
- U.S. National Register of Historic Places
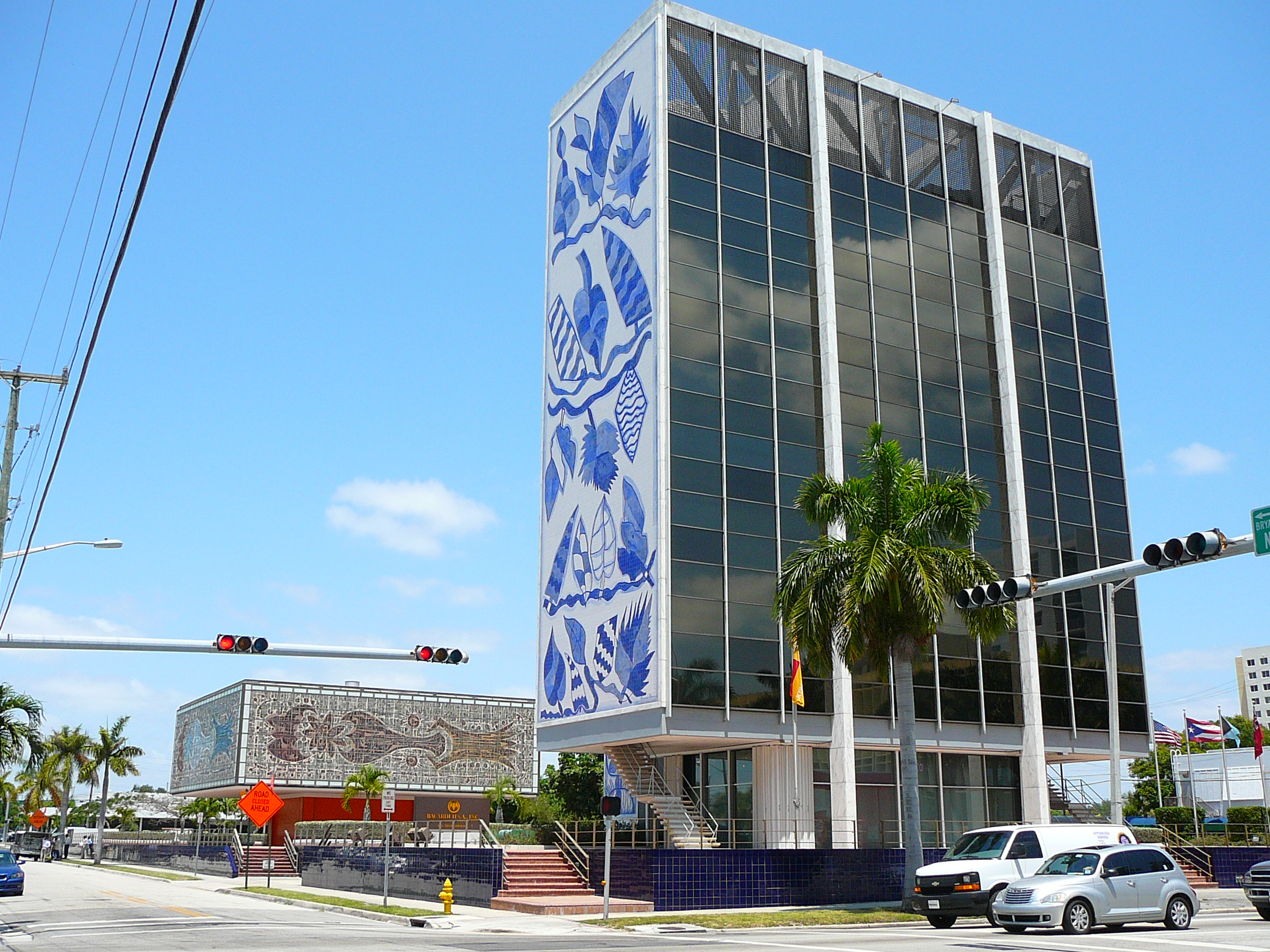
- Location: 2100 Biscayne Blvd. Miami, Florida
- Coordinates: 25.797446°N 80.189375°W
- Architects: Enrique Gutierrez (Office Tower); Ignacio Carrera-Justiz (Administration Annex)
- Architectural style: International Style (architecture)
- NRHP reference No.: 100003017
- Added to NRHP: October 16, 2018

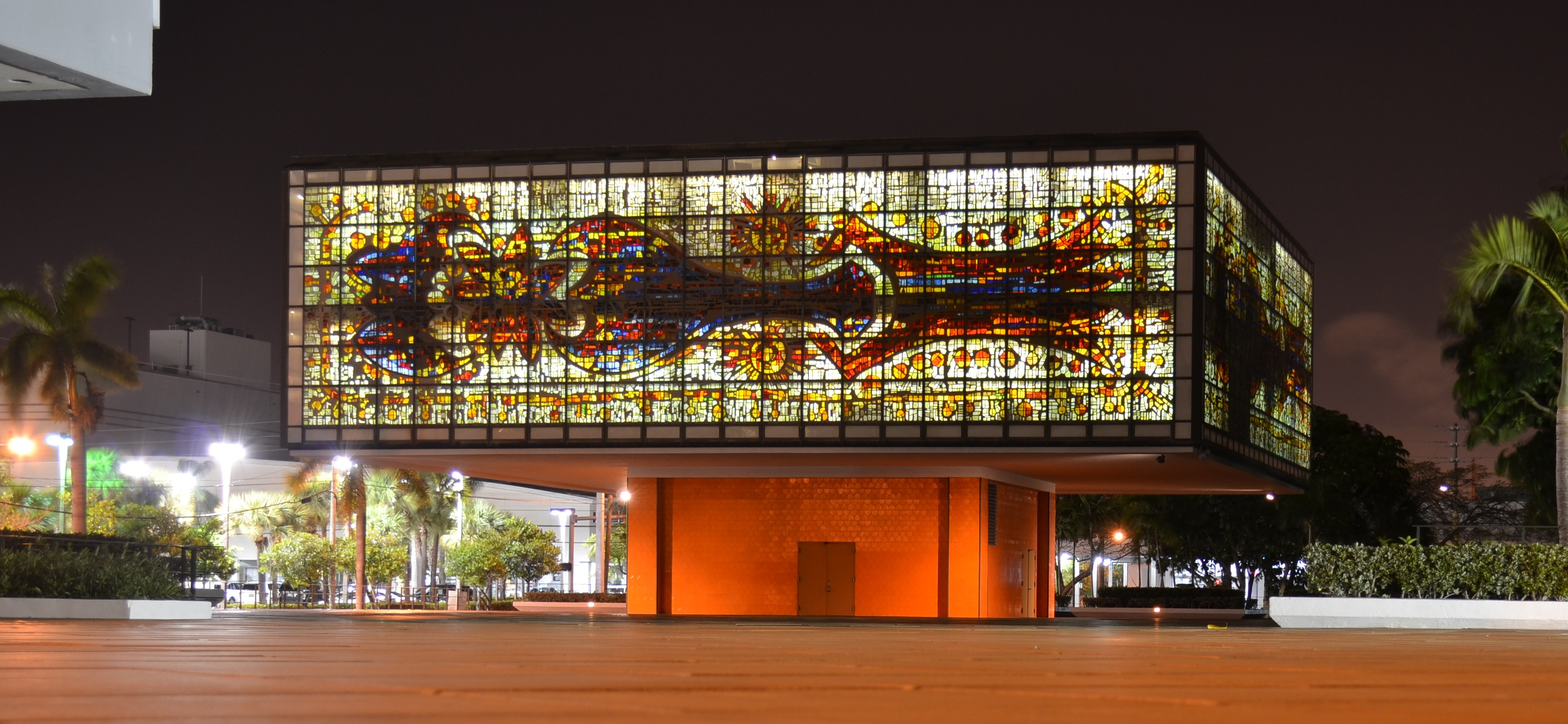
The rear of the annex building, lit up

The Bacardi Buildings are a landmark of Midtown Miami and served as the former headquarters of Bacardi USA. The site, located at 2100 Biscayne Boulevard, consists of the Bacardi Imports Tower and the Bacardi Imports Administration Annex, also known as "The Jewel Box". The tower and the annex were constructed in 1963 and 1973, respectively, and in 2018 they were added to the National Register of Historic Places.

== Bacardi complex ==
The two buildings are located in a plaza at 2100 Biscayne Boulevard. The plaza sits directly above an underground parking garage and features a large painted Bacardi logo, which is visible to planes arriving at and departing from Miami International Airport. Both buildings are accessible from the parking garage via elevators.

=== Bacardi Imports Tower ===
The Bacardi Imports Tower, built in 1963, was the first of the two buildings to be constructed. It was commissioned by former Bacardi president José “Pepin” Bosch and designed by Cuban architect Enrique Gutierrez. Azulejo murals by Brazilian artist and ceramist Francisco Brennand cover two of the building's walls, giving it the nickname "the blue tile building".

=== Bacardi Imports Administration Annex ===
The administration annex was constructed ten years after the tower, in 1973, and was designed by Ignacio Carrera-Justiz of Coral Gables, Florida. It is referred to as "The Jewel Box" because of the colorful hammered-glass mosaic covering its four sides. The Mesoamerican-themed mosaic was designed by German artist Johannes M. Dietz.

== Induction into National Register of Historic Places ==
Around 2009, Miami citizens began a campaign to label the buildings as "historic". University of Miami professor of architecture Allan Shulman said "Miami's brand is its identity as a tropical city. The Bacardi buildings are exactly the sort that resonate with our consciousness of what Miami is about". In 2007, Chad Oppenheim, the head of Oppenheim Architecture + Design, described the Bacardi buildings as "elegant, with a Modernist [look combined with] a local flavour."

On April 18, 2012, the American Institute of Architects' Florida chapter placed the buildings on its list of Florida Architecture: 100 Years. 100 Places as Bacardi USA. The complex was listed on the National Register of Historic Places in 2018.

== Current status ==
The Bacardi Buildings have been occupied by the National YoungArts Foundation since 2012. The current Bacardi headquarters are located at 2701 Le Jeune Road in Coral Gables, Florida.
