= Ludwig Mies Van Der Rohe and Felix Candela's Industrial Buildings =

Buildings in Mexico City, Mexico

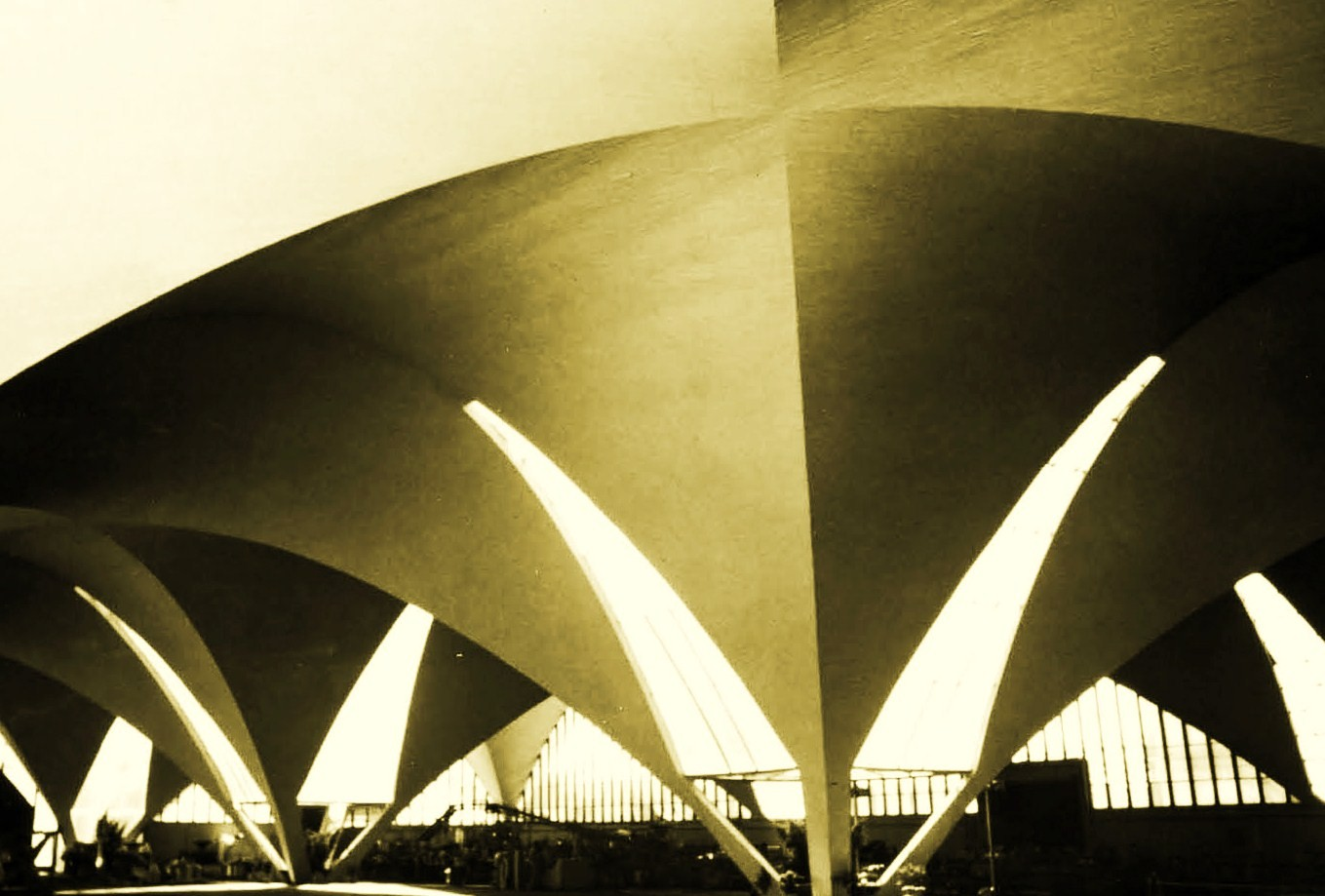

General information
- Type: Industrial
- Location: Tultitlán de Mariano Escobedo, Tultitlán, Greater Mexico City, México
- Coordinates: 19°37′40″N 99°11′26″W
- Completed: 1961

Design and construction
- Architects: Ludwig Mies van der Rohe, Felix Candela

The Bacardi buildings of Ludwig Mies van der Rohe and Félix Candela are located in the Greater Mexico City, Mexico. This site was added to the UNESCO World Heritage Tentative List on 20 November 2001 in the Cultural category.

== Office building ==
The complex was originally constructed between 1958 and 1961. Mies van der Rohe designed the corporate office building, and Felix Candela designed the bottling plant and distillery cellars, of Bacardi & Co. The bottling company's owner, Jose "Pepín" Bosch, had originally commissioned Van der Rohe to design the company's headquarters in Santiago de Cuba and Bacardi's plant in the outskirts of Mexico City. Bosch was impressed with Crown Hall, and requested an office "where there were no partitions, where everybody, both officers and employees, could see each other."

The two-story rectangular office building's dimensions are 56 meters by 27 meters, and it was constructed parallel to the main highway from Mexico City to Querétaro. The building is two floors high and eight meters tall. It has an open plan lobby. The second floor has offices and meeting rooms, enclosed by glass.

== Distillery and Ageing building ==
Felix Candela designed the buildings to incorporate large concrete shells: "long-barrel vaults" and umbrella domes at the warehouses and workshops. These materials allowed for above average illumination indoors, and along with overall design, it created a unique architectural collection. They were inspired by Minoru Yamasaki’s and Anton Tedesko’s 1956 Lambert-St. Louis Airport Terminal.

The factory roof was originally formed by three vaults 4-centimeter (1.6 inches) thick and 26 meters (85.3 ft.) square in plan with 2.5 m. (27.9 ft.) overhanging arches on each side. A second row of three vaults was added in 1971 using the same design but built by another architect.
