= Carman Hall (Illinois Institute of Technology) =

Dormitory owned by the Illinois Institute of Technology

Coordinates: 41°50′12″N 87°37′29″W

Carman Hall is a dormitory owned by the Illinois Institute of Technology.

== History ==
Carman Hall was constructed from 1951 to 1953 and opened in 1953 following an investment of $1,150,000 and was originally built for married students and university staff.

The building underwent renovations in 2021.

== Design ==
The building was designed by Ludwig Mies van der Rohe who was the director of the university's department of architecture at the time. It was named after George N. Carman, the first director of the Lewis Institute, one of the predecessor schools of the university. The building has nine floors.
