= Downtown Martinsburg Historic District =

Historic district in West Virginia, United States

- U.S. National Register of Historic Places
- U.S. Historic district
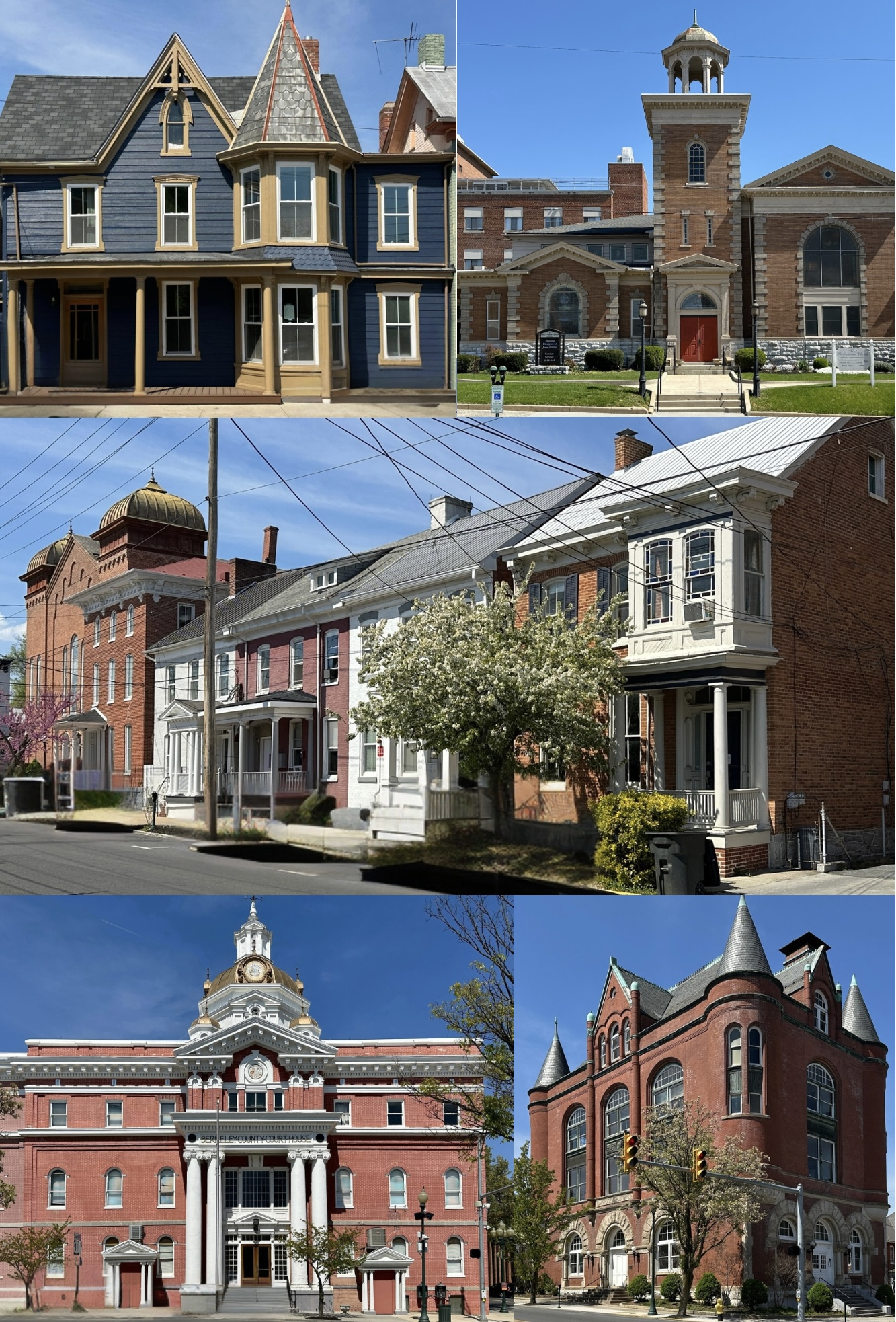
- Downtown Martinsburg Historic District in 2026. (from left to right) 120-122 West Martin Street, First Presbyterian Church, 210-220 West Burke Street, former Berkeley County Courthouse, former United States Courthouse and Post Office

- Location within West Virginia Location within the United States
- Location: Roughly bounded by W. Race, Water, Stephen, and Charles Sts., Martinsburg, West Virginia
- Coordinates: 39°27′28″N 77°57′59″W
- Area: 139 acres (56 ha)
- Architect: Multiple
- Architectural style: Gothic Revival, Italianate, Queen Anne
- MPS: Berkeley County MRA
- NRHP reference No.: 80004416
- Added to NRHP: December 10, 1980

Downtown Martinsburg Historic District is a national historic district located at Martinsburg, Berkeley County, West Virginia. It encompasses 281 contributing buildings. It includes government and industrial buildings, several schools, firehouses, and churches, the two main commercial and professional areas along Queen and King Streets, a major hospital, and surrounding residential areas. The buildings reflect a number of popular 19th-century architectural styles including Gothic Revival, Italianate, and Queen Anne.

It was listed on the National Register of Historic Places in 1980.
