= Washington Hall (University of Notre Dame) =

- U.S. Historic district – Contributing property
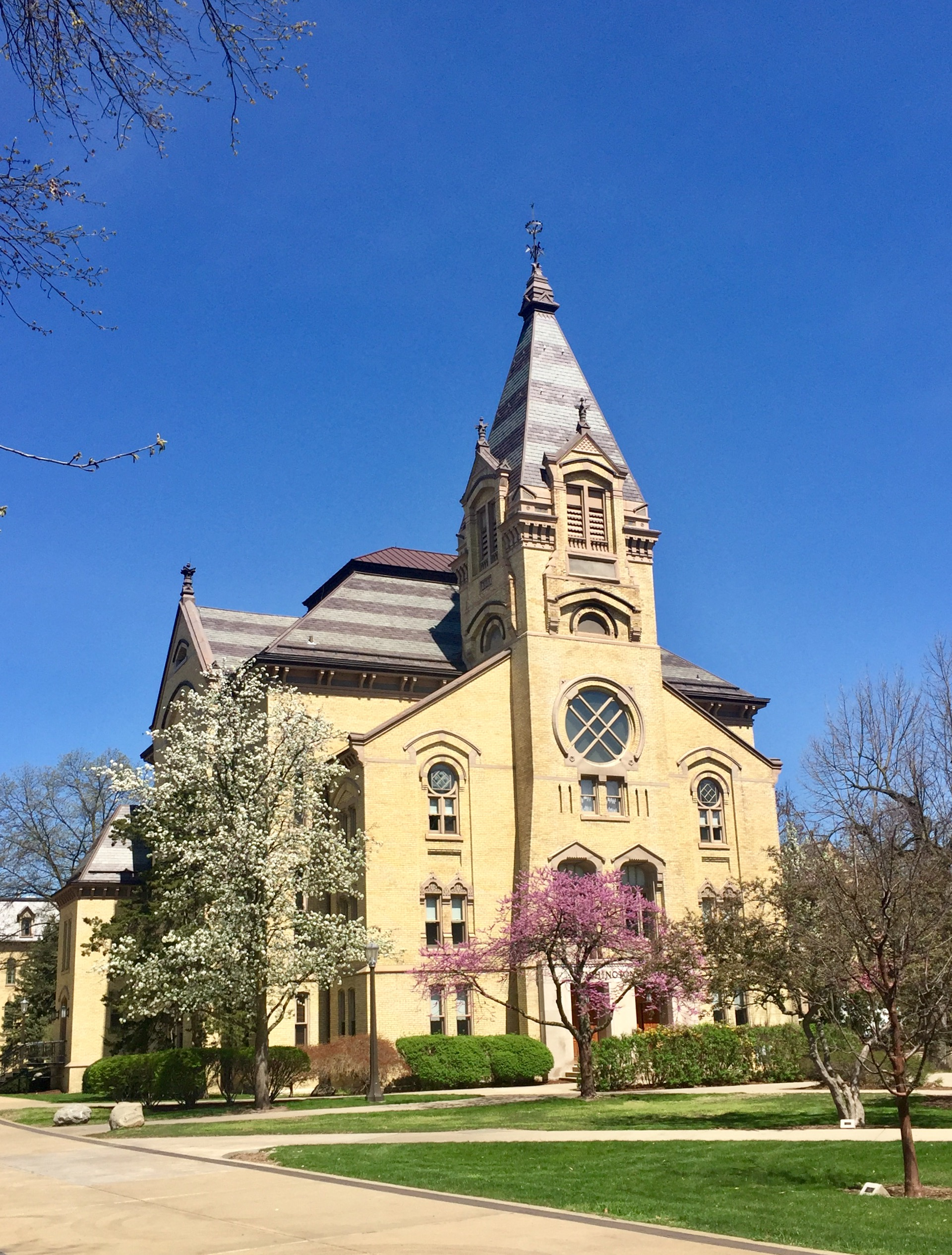

- Location within Indiana
- Location: Notre Dame, Indiana
- Coordinates: 41°42′8.2764″N 86°14′17.4516″W
- Built: 1881
- Architect: Willoughby J. Edbrooke
- Architectural style: Second Empire architecture
- Part of: University of Notre Dame: Main and South Quadrangles (ID78000053)
- Added to NRHP: May 23, 1978

Washington Hall at the University of Notre Dame in Notre Dame, Indiana is the seventh oldest university owned building on the historic campus. It is part of the University of Notre Dame: Main and North Quadrangles historic district, listed on the National Register of Historic Places, and was the original home of the university's music and performing arts programs.

The theater is located just east of the university's Golden Dome, the university's main administrative building, on the main quad on campus, also known as God Quad.

== History ==
=== Notre Dame before Washington Hall ===
Ever since the university's earliest years, the site of Washington Hall has been associated in the minds of Notre Dame students, alumni, faculty and staff with music, entertainment and recreation. In the 19th century, Notre Dame was a small and very much self-contained institution. As early as 1846, the combination of a recognition that Notre Dame would have to provide its own entertainment and a French-inspired appreciation for the fine, dramatic and musical arts led the university's founders to reserve a building for artistic instruction and performance.

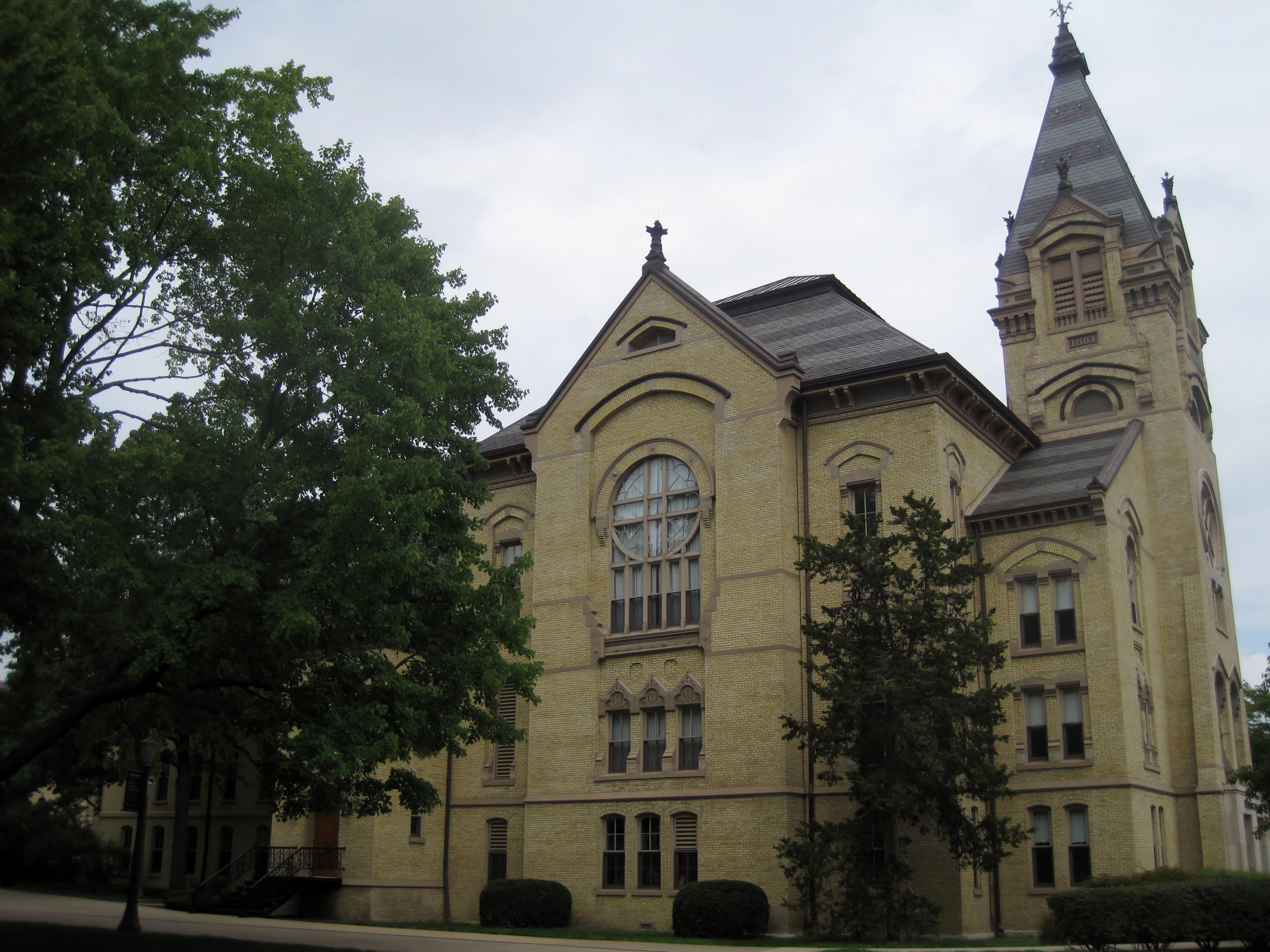
Washington Hall

The original music hall, which stood on the site next to the Administration Building now occupied by Washington Hall, was a two-story clapboard building. It housed classrooms and practice rooms as well as facilities for lectures, concerts and campus assemblies. The building played a major role in the life of Notre Dame throughout the early years.

On April 23, 1879, however, the life of the university changed abruptly when a fire destroyed the five major campus buildings, including the music hall. Although the university literally stood in ashes, the Congregation of Holy Cross was determined to rebuild Notre Dame. Wiloughby J. Edbrooke, a Chicago architect, was commissioned to create a new campus. Two years later, the task was largely completed.

=== Construction ===
Among the new buildings was Washington Hall. Father Edward Sorin chose to name it after the first President rather than a Catholic saint, both show his commitment to the American republic (in an age of anti-Catholicism which Catholics were often seen as not American) and to express his newfound patriotic sentiment towards the United States. Washington Hall was built in the “Modern Gothic” style so popular in the 19th-century Midwest and so much in evidence in Notre Dame's oldest buildings. The placement, façade and proportions of the new building were intended to parallel those of nearby Sacred Heart Church. Because they do so successfully, Washington Hall from the beginning helped to define the boundaries of the main quadrangle of the campus. Thus, even today, Washington Hall remains at the physical core of the university.

The new building retained its function as a music hall. One of its two components continued to provide classrooms and practice rooms for individual students, the orchestra and the marching band. Nonetheless, the octagonal-shaped theater, which the building also housed, became synonymous with the words Washington Hall. This theater, which was completely painted over in 1956, once stood as a fine example of the late 19th century décor. Frescoes and murals by Luigi Geogori and Signor Rusca included four emblematic figures of tragedy, comedy, music and poetry above which were portraits of Shakespeare, Molière, Mozart and Dante. Over the proscenium, Washington loomed, flanked by Demosthenes and Cicero on either side. The theater could accommodate 300 spectators in its gallery and another 400 on the ground floor.

=== Through the years ===
Over the years, the theater has provided the Notre Dame community with countless hours of entertainment and intellectual stimulation. Numerous student productions have been offered on its stage, beginning with the 1882 production of Oedipus Tyrannus. It has served as a forum for speakers ranging from William Howard Taft, Cardinal Gasquet, Douglas Hyde, Seumas MacManus, Henry James, William Butler Yeats, William Jennings Bryan, Tennessee Williams, Pete Seeger and Phil Donahue.

William Butler Yeats stopped at Notre Dame during his tour of America between 1903 and 1904. At Notre Dame, he learned about the student production of the Oedipus Rex in Washington Hall. This play was banned in England, an act he viewed as hypocritical as denounced as part of 'British Puritanism. He contrasted this with the artistic freedom of the Catholicism found at Notre Dame, which had allowed such a play with themes such as incest and parricide. He desired to stage a production of the Oedipus Rex in Dublin.

Eamon De Valera, President of Ireland, arrived on campus to visit Notre Dame on October 15, 1919. After a warm welcome by the student body, he lay a wreath under statue of Father Corby and planted a tree in honor of his visit. He then spoke in Washington hall about the cause of Ireland in front of twelve hundred students. His address was followed by an impressive ovation and De Valera stated that "It was the happiest day since coming to America."

On October 25, 1936, Washington Hall was the location for the visit by Cardinal Secretary of State Eugenio Pacelli, future Pope Pius XII, on his stop at Notre Dame during his visit to the United States. On the stage of the theatre he gave an address and benediction, and received an honorary degree from President O'Hara.

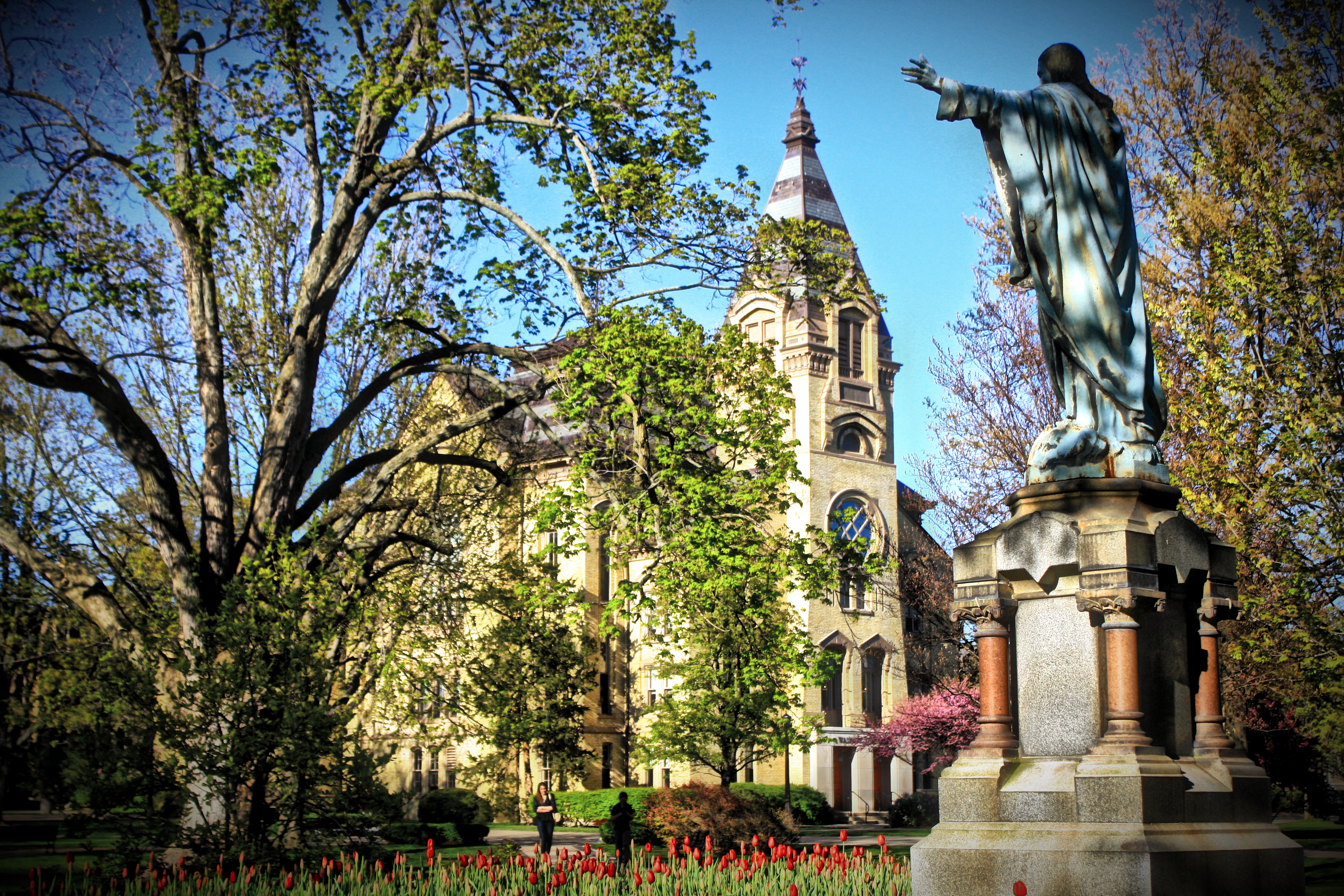
View of Washington Hall

=== Legendary figures ===
Notre Dame has often associated in the public mind with legendary figures but few Notre Dame legends have endured as long or lodged themselves as firmly in campus apocrypha as has the ghost of Washington Hall. Theories as to the ghost's identity vary, with the most persistent hypotheses being that the ghost is either that of George Gipp, who supposedly slept on the steps of Washington Hall the night before he became fatally ill in 1920 or a Steeplejack who fell to his death while working in 1886. While they may not agree on the ghost's identity, few students scoff at stories of doors slamming on windless nights, footsteps heard on the roof, or inexplicable noises heard during late-night play preparations. To them the ghost of Washington Hall is very real and very much a part of the respect for the tradition that makes Notre Dame, Notre Dame.

=== National Register of Historic Places ===
In May 1978, approximately seventy acres of the University of Notre Dame campus were entered as an historic district on the National Register of Historic Places. The National Register is the federal government's official list of the nation's cultural resources worthy of preservation. Inclusion of a district, site or building on the National Register is determined after both state and federal review boards have assessed the quality of significance of the nominated property in American history, architecture, archaeology and culture. Districts must possess integrity of location, design, setting, materials, workmanship, feeling and association, and a) Be associated with events that have made a significant contribution to the broad patterns of our national history; b) Be associated with the lives of significant historical persons; c) Embody distinctive characteristics of architectural and artistic design and construction; d) Yield important historical evidence. Listing on the National Register makes properties eligible for protection under federal preservation law and for federal grants-in-aid for exterior restoration.

Notre Dame's historic district was assessed to be of significance particularly in the areas of architecture, community planning and educational and religious history. Washington Hall (1881), the seventh oldest extant structure in the district, was identified as a critical structure in both the original campus design plan and as an example of the university's predominant architectural style. Its location at the very center makes its preservation essential for the maintenance of the district's historical aesthetic integrity.

== Current building use ==
With the opening of the DeBartolo Performing Arts Center in the 2004 fall semester, the Student Activities Office entered into an agreement with the Provost's Office to transform Washington Hall from an academic building into a student-centered venue.

The building is divided into five main uses for student groups:

=== Mainstage ===
550-seat auditorium suitable for theatrical productions, musicals, pageants, and lectures.

=== Rehearsal Room 110 ===
A large room suitable for dance practice and performing arts rehearsals.

=== Lab Theatre ===
Located on the third floor, a black box theatre with a capacity of 100. Great for small scale theatrical productions and rehearsals.

=== Scene Shop ===
The Scene Shop, located on the first floor, is available for students to build sets for their productions.

=== Club storage rooms ===
Space allocation is made on an annual basis during the spring semester during the club registration process.

== Performers of Washington Hall ==
- Actors from the London Stage
- The Notre Dame Dance Company
- The Notre Dame Undertones
- The Not-So-Royal Shakespeare Company (NSR)
- Pasquerilla East Musical Company (PEMCo)
