= Mecca Flats =

Apartment building in Chicago (1891–1952)

General information
- Location: Chicago, Illinois, U.S.
- Completed: 1891
- Closed: 1952

Design and construction
- Architects: Edbrooke and Burnham

Mecca Flats was an apartment complex that existed from 1891 to 1952 in Chicago, Illinois, United States. It was originally built as a hotel for visitors to the World's Columbian Exposition. The building was designed by Willoughby J. Edbrooke and Franklin Pierce Burnham. The 96-unit Mecca Flats became an apartment complex after the 1893 World's Columbian Exposition and is also known as the Mecca Apartments to some.

After the Exposition when the building was converted to apartments, rooms were leased only to white tenants at first. This policy was later reversed, and the building became home to mostly middle-class black families. IIT razed the building in 1952 after a decade-long fight with tenants who aimed to prevent its destruction. S.R. Crown Hall, designed by Mies van der Rohe, replaced the building. Portions of the building's basement floor were unearthed in 2018 and subsequently displayed by IIT's architectural school, which is located in S.R. Crown Hall.

The building inspired a song by Jimmy Blythe titled "Mecca Flats Blues" and a poem, "In the Mecca", by poet Gwendolyn Brooks.

== History ==
The Mecca Flats was originally seen as a building for the rich since it was initially constructed to serve as housing for the visitors of the 1893 World's Fair in Chicago. The Mecca Apartments were located on the west side of State Street, which at the time, was a line of racial division with white residents on the east side and African-American residents living on the west side. In 1911, the owners of the building retracted their original all-white tenant policy, and allowed African-American families who were looking to rent a larger apartment in a fairly new building to live there.

The complex began a transition from only Caucasian residents to mostly African-American residents, with most of these new residents having middle-class professions like hotel clerks and Pullman Porters. The design of the structure made it popular during the time period since it was one of the first Chicago residential buildings with a landscaped courtyard open to the street, which combined the two ideals of building densely while also preserving the natural landscape.

In 1941, Illinois Tech acquired the building. In 1952, the Mecca Flat was torn down to allow for the construction of S. R. Crown Hall by Mies van der Rohe. Residents of the building objected to the college's plans. The preservation effort for the Mecca Flats lasted for 15 years, from 1937 to 1952, and this effort was one of the first examples of a Chicago community preservation effort to save an important and historic building from demolition. In fact, this might even be one of the first community efforts that opposed a concept that is now known as "urban renewal".

The concept of "urban renewal" was a response by mid-20th-century urban planners to "urban decline" in American cities, which ultimately led to the erasure of entire neighborhoods, deepened residential segregation, urban poverty, and racism. In 1943, the Illinois Legislature passed a bill that was meant to preserve the Mecca Flat, but Illinois Governor Dwight Green vetoed the bill, and the courts allowed for the demolition of the building in 1952.

== Design ==
Knowledge about the design of the Mecca Flats is limited because only black and white photographs survive, making it impossible to know what the exact appearance of the complex was. Although the residents were mostly middle class, the apartments were large. One important aspect in the design and decoration of the Mecca Apartments were the intricately detailed iron guardrails. Included in the building's design were two sky lit interior courts surrounded by stacked open corridors, which were unique and contributed to the buildings reputation of having no secrets.

The open interior design heightened social drama because residents were able to observe the actions and lives of the other residents. The residents of the apartment complex were able to enter their homes through open galleries that encircled the interior courts. A popular Chicago vernacular tradition would later be inspired by this design of having a courtyard within an apartment complex.

In the late 19th century, the need and want for more light and fresh air for the city's apartments became more pronounced, and residents wanted small parks and playgrounds to be available in the neighborhoods. Overall, the Mecca Flats layout was able to fulfill these progressive concerns through a new and innovative design.

=== Artifacts found at Crown Hall ===
In July 2018, construction workers found the tiled floor of the basement at Mecca Flats while they were digging a hole for a pipe while Crown Hall was under construction. This discovery revealed that the overall design of the building included more bright and vivid colors than previously thought. It is assumed that most, if not all, of the building was decorated with similar vibrant colors because the basement tile matches the same pattern as the flooring in the court.

The colors of the patterned floor tile that were discovered include blues, oranges, and browns. The construction work being done at Crown Hall was suspended so that a team of historians and urban archaeologists can excavate a portion of the remaining tile. These artifacts will be installed in a permanent exhibit dedicated to the Mecca Flat at the Graham Resource Center once the tiles have been properly preserved.

== Media inspirations ==
=== "In the Mecca" by Gwendolyn Brooks ===
Aspiring author Gwendolyn Brooks was once a worker for one of the residents at Mecca Flats and she started delivering goods door-to-door. Through her job, she became familiar with nearly all of the residents and got to learn about their lives and culture. She later wrote a long poem called "In the Mecca" that discussed the effects that urban design and discourses had on the residents of the Mecca Flat during the time of the building's decline. Brooks's writing also included narrative about the bleak time period at the Mecca Apartments when the complex was used as a tenement for poor and mostly African-American residents.

=== "Mecca Flat Blues" by Jimmy Blythe ===
The vibrancy and social life that was present at the Mecca Flats inspired the musician Jimmy Blythe to write his jazz song "Mecca Flat Blues" in 1924, which he recorded with vocalist Priscilla Stewart that year.
