= Grand Opera House (Dubuque, Iowa) =

- U.S. National Register of Historic Places
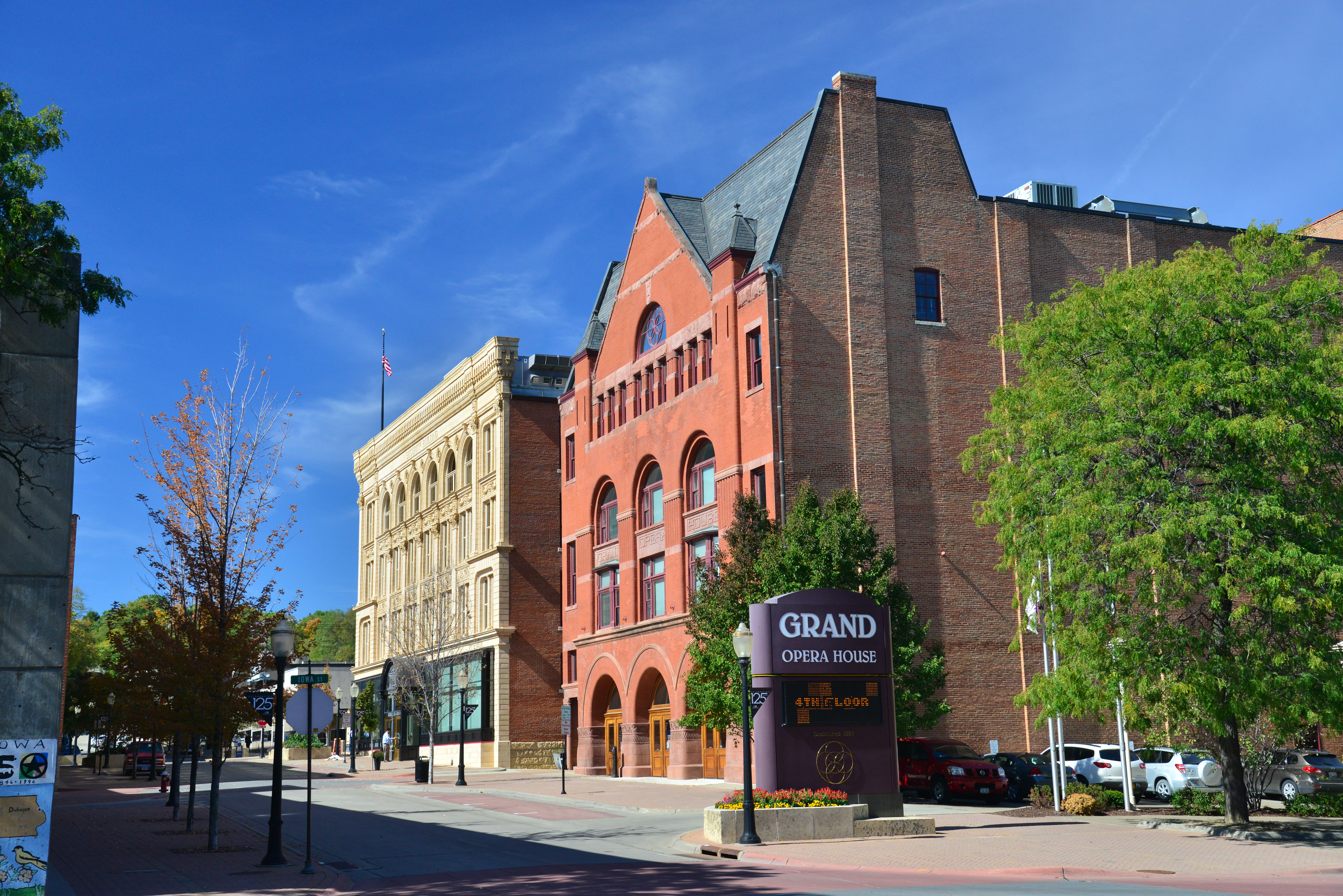

- Location within Iowa Location within the United States
- Interactive map showing the location of Grand Opera House
- Location: 135 8th St. Dubuque, Iowa
- Coordinates: 42°30′6″N 90°39′56″W
- Area: less than 1 acre (0.40 ha)
- Built: 1890
- Architect: Willoughby J. Edbrooke
- Architectural style: Richardsonian Romanesque
- MPS: Footlights in Farm Country: Iowa Opera Houses MPS
- NRHP reference No.: 02001029
- Added to NRHP: September 20, 2002

The Grand Opera House is an opera house located at the corner of 8th and Iowa Streets in Dubuque, Iowa that was built in 1890. It was listed on the National Register of Historic Places in 2002.

It was deemed important as a "national treasure". The theatre has the largest of all stages ever in Dubuque, and is Dubuque's only surviving opera house. It is architecturally important as an early Richardsonian Romanesque building in Dubuque and as a salient work of Chicago architect Willoughby James Edbrooke. It is Edbrooke's only surviving opera house, and he used its design in his design portfolio that won him the position of Supervising Architect of the U.S. Treasury Department in 1891. Its design is said to be "representative of Edbrooke's smooth exterior wall interpretation of the Richardsonian Romanesque style." It is also historically important from its association with high-quality theatre in Dubuque during 1890-1928. The theater has been preserved with great historic integrity and, in 2002, was being restored for continuing use in live stage entertainment. Its history is extremely well documented.
