= Willoughby J. Edbrooke =

American architect (1843–1896)

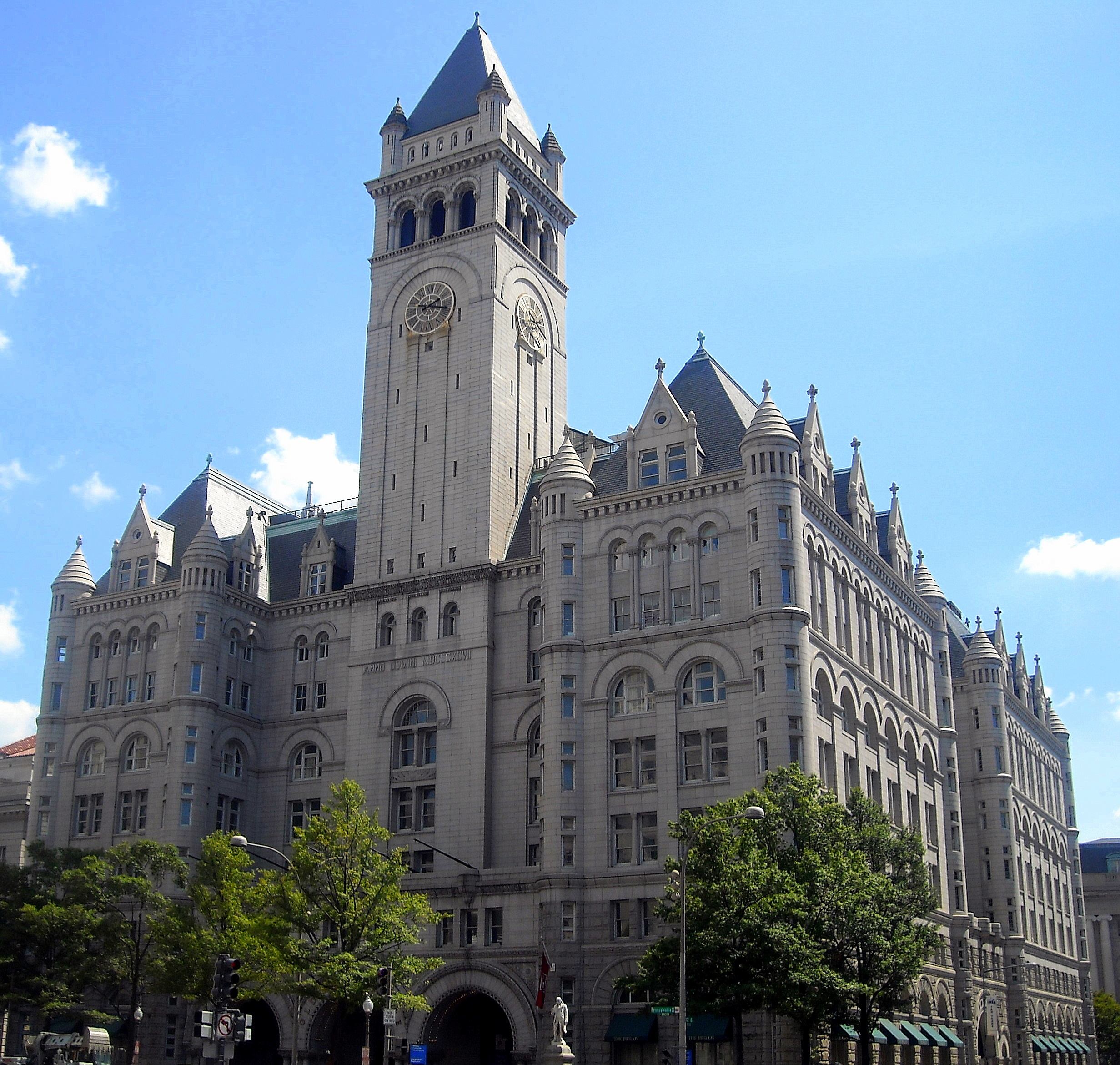
The Old Post Office Building in Washington, D.C.

Willoughby James Edbrooke (1843–1896) was an American architect and a bureaucrat who remained faithful to a Richardsonian Romanesque style into the era of Beaux-Arts architecture in the United States, supported by commissions from conservative federal and state governments that were spurred by his stint in 1891-92 as Supervising Architect of the U.S. Treasury Department.

== Early life ==
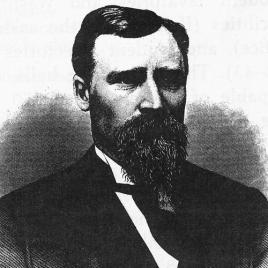
Willoughby J. Edbrooke

Edbrooke was born in Evanston, Illinois, in 1842.

== Career ==
Edbrooke first practiced in Chicago, in 1868 and in 1879 formed a partnership with Franklin Pierce Burnham (died 1909). The partnership was dissolved in 1892. Among their major joint commissions were the Georgia State Capitol, and buildings for University of Notre Dame, and the Mecca Flats in Chicago, where Edbrooke served as superintendent of construction. The division of responsibilities and credit for constructions at the World's Columbian Exposition, Chicago, 1893, may have finalized the dissolution of the partnership. Edbrooke resided in Washington DC, where in his position as supervising architect of the Treasury Department, he initiated the design of at least forty buildings.

The monumentally classical Georgia State Capitol shows Burnham's design sensibility rather than Edbrooke's, as Edbrooke's late constructions show. At the turn of the twentieth century, fire destroyed many of the documents in storage at the Capitol, including the original plans and specifications for the building. The competition for the capitol's design was judged by New York architect, George B. Post, who remarked its "beauty, strength and harmony" in justifying his selection of the Edbrooke and Burnham classicizing design, that it was more academically correct, simple and elegant, and monumental in its appearance. At the World's Columbian Exposition in Chicago, 1893, the Government Building was ascribed to Willoughby J. Edbrooke. Its classicizing design fit in harmoniously with the "White City" that ushered in the American Renaissance movement and the age of Beaux-Arts architecture. At the Exposition, Franklin P. Burnham was officially credited only with the Cold-Storage Warehouse, while "Willoughby J. Edbrooke, Washington" is credited with the United States Government Building and the other official federal exhibits.

Edbrooke was elected a Fellow of the American Institute of Architects.

His son Harry W. J. Edbrooke (1873–1946) went into practice with Willoughby's brother, Frank E. Edbrooke, the dean of early Denver architecture.

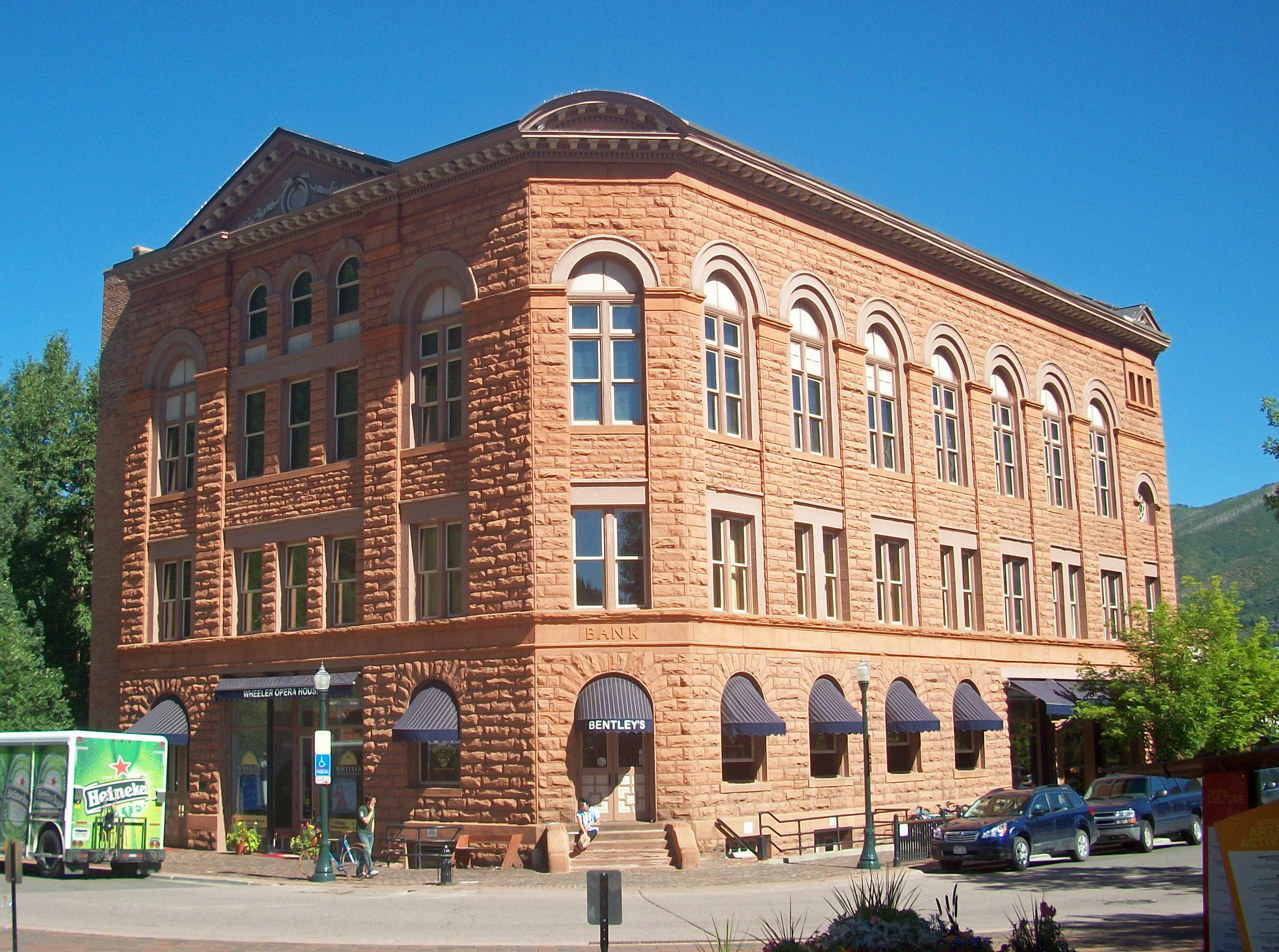
Wheeler Opera House, a landmark in the center of Aspen, Colorado

== Selected works ==
- Wheeler Opera House, Aspen, Colorado (1888–89).

=== With Franklin P. Burnham ===
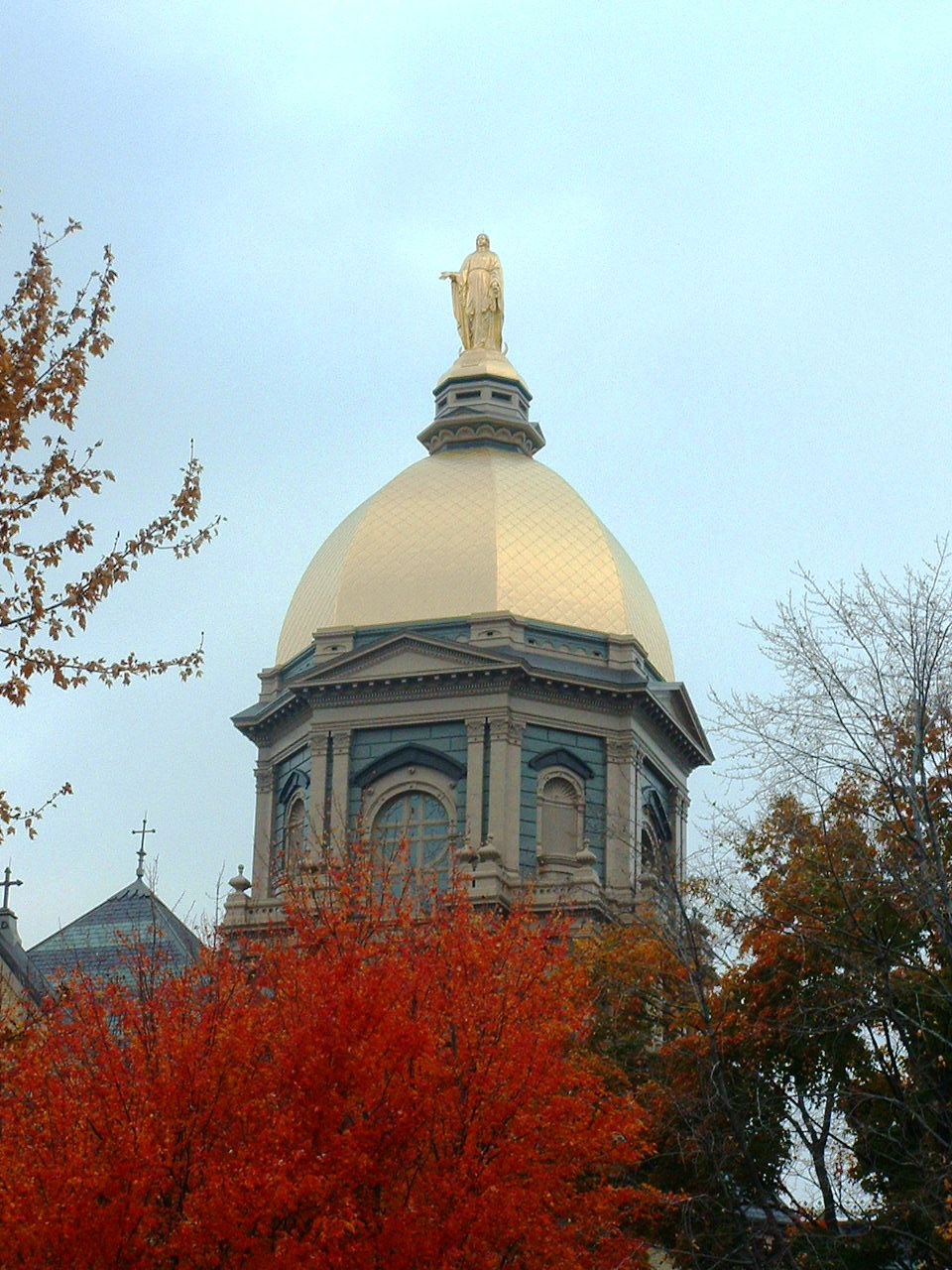
Edbrooke's Golden Dome, a landmark of the University of Notre Dame

- Construction for University of Notre Dame: the Main Administration Building (1879), Washington Hall (1881), LaFortune Student Center (1883) and Sorin Hall (1889).
- Georgia State Capitol (1884–1889) Co-architect Franklin P. Burnham. It was built by Miles and Horne. George Crouch worked on the ornamental sculpture.
- Christ Episcopal Church, Waukegan, Illinois (1887–1889). Co-architect Franklin P. Burnham. Done in classic Richardsonian Romanesque style, its interior has been updated but preserves much of the original aesthetic. It also features an excellent collection of stained glass windows, including one from the studios of Louis Comfort Tiffany. Located at 410 Grand Ave, it continues to be an active Episcopal parish.
- 7th District Police Station, Chicago, Illinois (1888) Co-architect Franklin P. Burnham
- Kane County Courthouse, Geneva, Illinois (c. 1890–1892). Co-architect Franklin P. Burnham.
- World's Columbian Exposition, Chicago (1893) Government Building. Co-architect Burnham.

=== As supervising architect ===
- Grand Opera House, Dubuque Iowa (1890) Edbrooke's only surviving opera house design.
- San Jose Post Office, San Jose, California (1892) Served as the main city library 1937–1969; occupied by the Civic Art Gallery 1969, renamed the San Jose Museum of Art 1974. In the 1906 earthquake the top of the tower collapsed into the street and was rebuilt in modified form.
- Old Post Office Building (Washington, D.C.) (1892–1899) During construction, five supervising architects made alterations to Edbrooke's design.
- Federal Court House and Post Office, Martinsburg, West Virginia (1892–1895) Edbrooke's design here, as at many federal structures commenced during his official term, was revised and detailed by assistants, in this case by Assistant Supervising Architect D.W. Aiken. Now housing a Federal Aviation Administration Records Center.
- York Federal Building, York, Pennsylvania (1895).
- Old United States Courthouse and Post Office, Duluth, Minnesota (1896). Co-architects Jeremiah O'Rourke, James Knox Taylor. Demolished.
- City Hall, Sioux City, Iowa (1896) Co-architect William Martin Aiken.
- U.S. Court of Appeals, San Francisco, California (1897–1905)
- Milwaukee Federal Building, Milwaukee, Wisconsin (1892–1899). Its five-bay entrance loggia virtually repeats the three-bay entrance loggia for the Old Post Office Building, Washington DC, being erected at the same time.
- Federal Archive Building, New York (1899). A full city block between Greenwich Street and Washington Street, its interior has been renovated as studios and loft apartments, as The Archive.
- Federal Court House and Post office for the Upper Midwest, now the "Landmark Center", St. Paul, Minnesota (1894–1902) Completed after Edbrooke's death, Cass Gilbert, supervising architect.
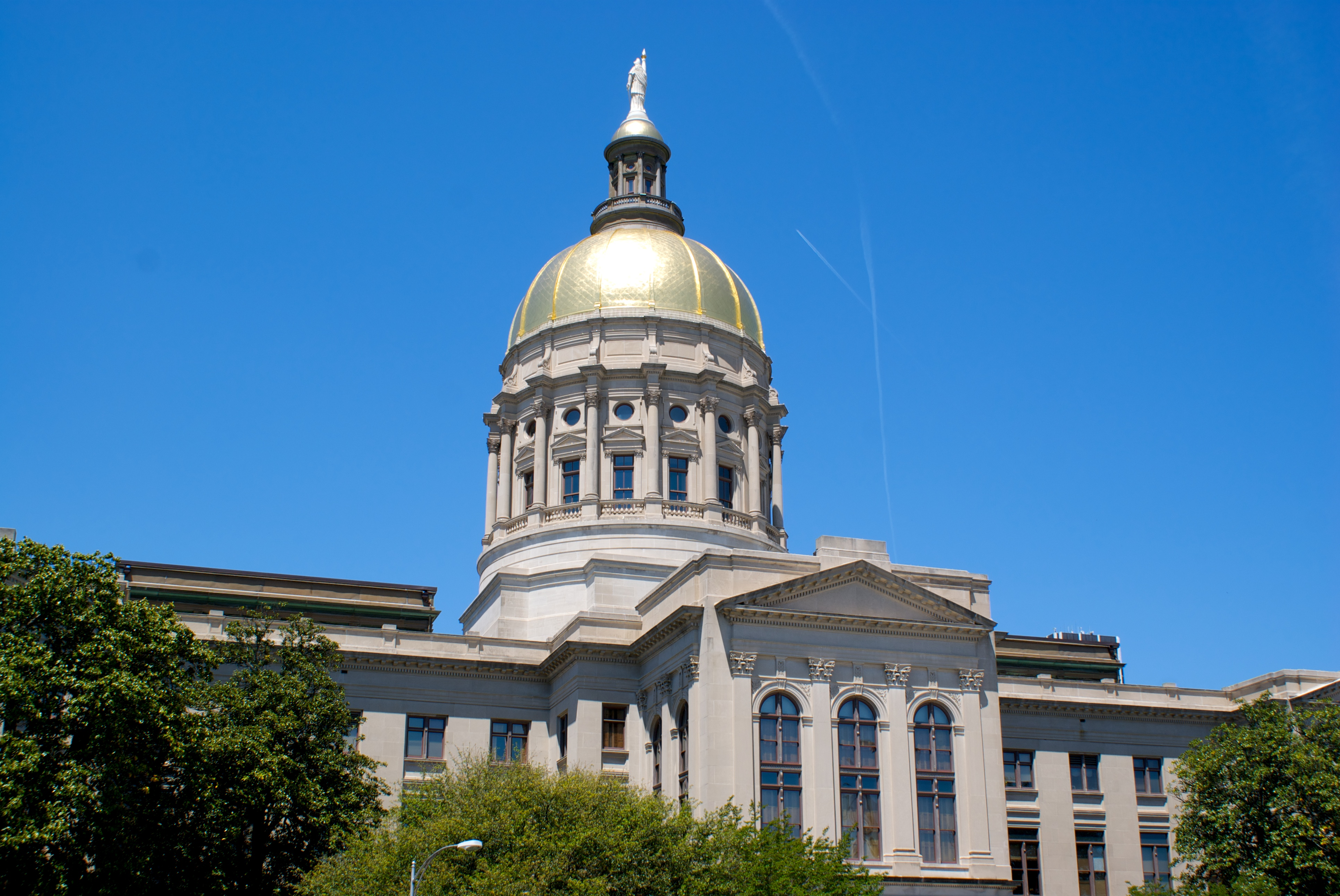
Georgia State Capitol, Atlanta, GA (1884–1889). With Franklin P. Burnham.

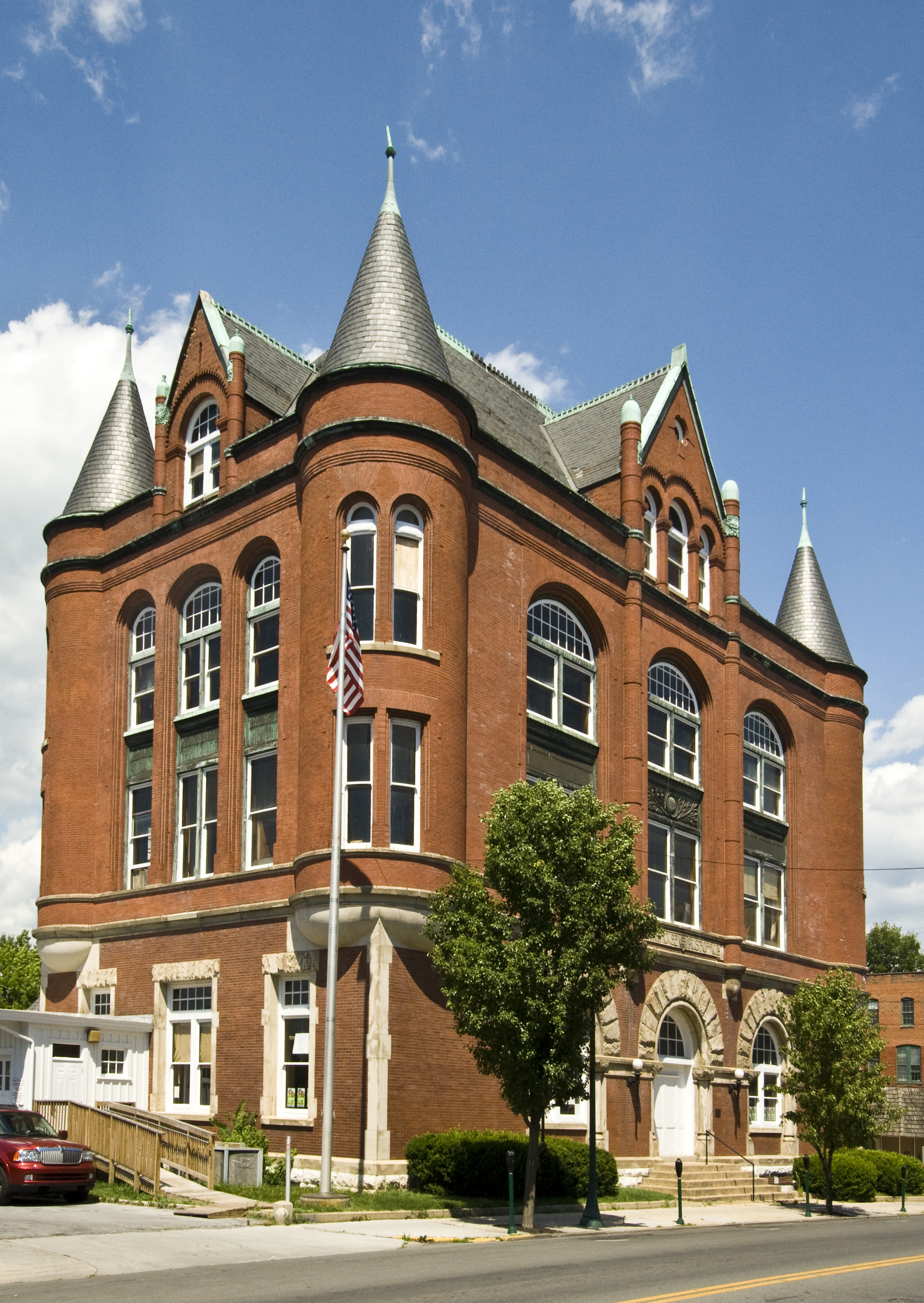
Federal Court House and Post Office, Martinsburg, WV (1892–1895).

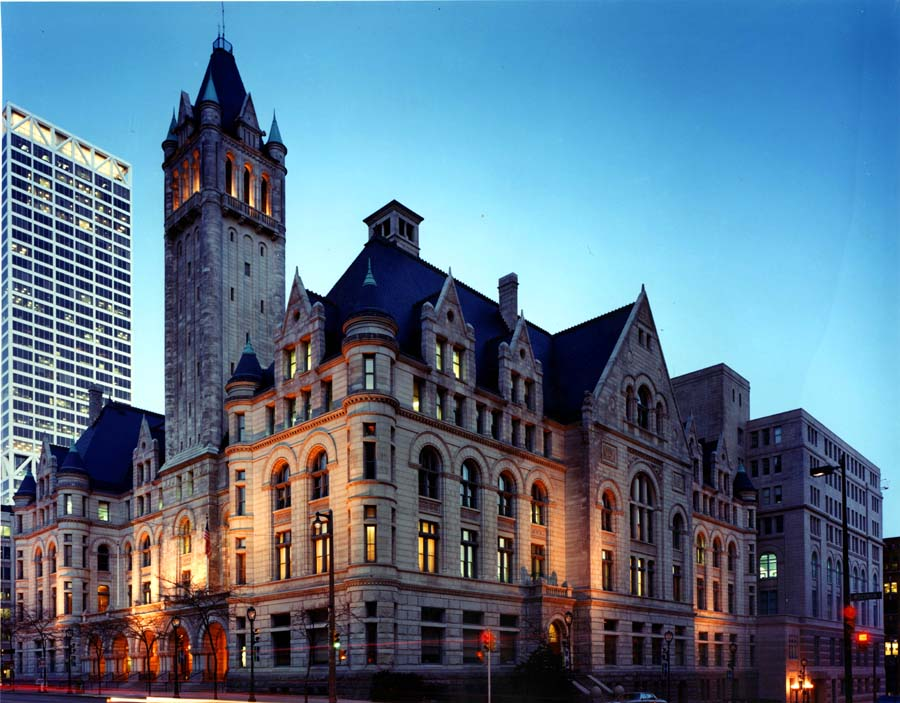
Milwaukee Federal Building, Milwaukee, WI (1892–1899).

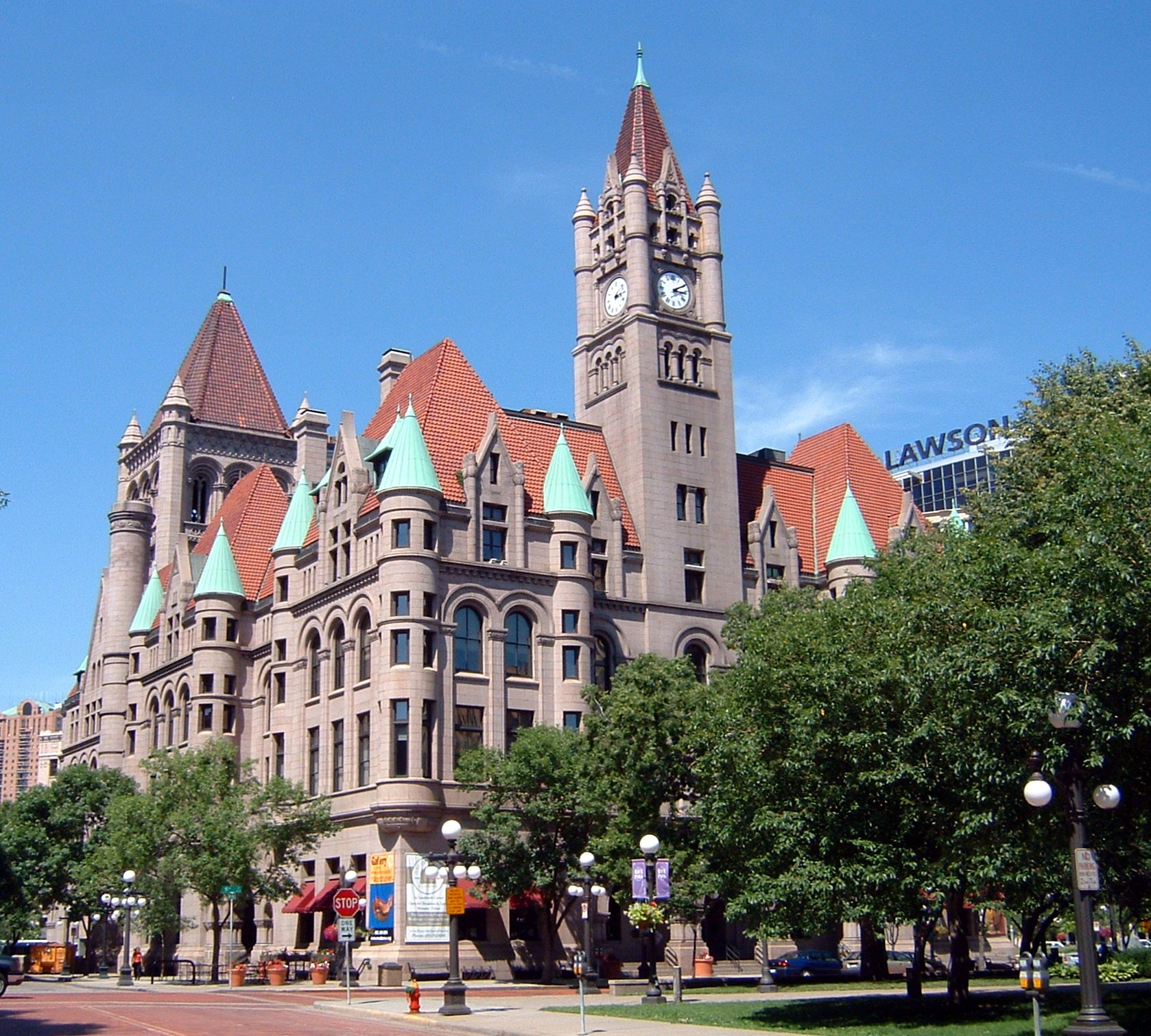
Federal Court House and Post Office, St. Paul, MN (1894–1902). Completed by James Knox Taylor.

| Preceded by James H. Windrim | Office of the Supervising Architect; 1891–1892 | Succeeded by Jeremiah O'Rourke |
