= S. R. Crown Hall =

Academic building in Chicago, Illinois

- U.S. National Register of Historic Places
- U.S. National Historic Landmark
- U.S. Historic district – Contributing property
- Chicago Landmark
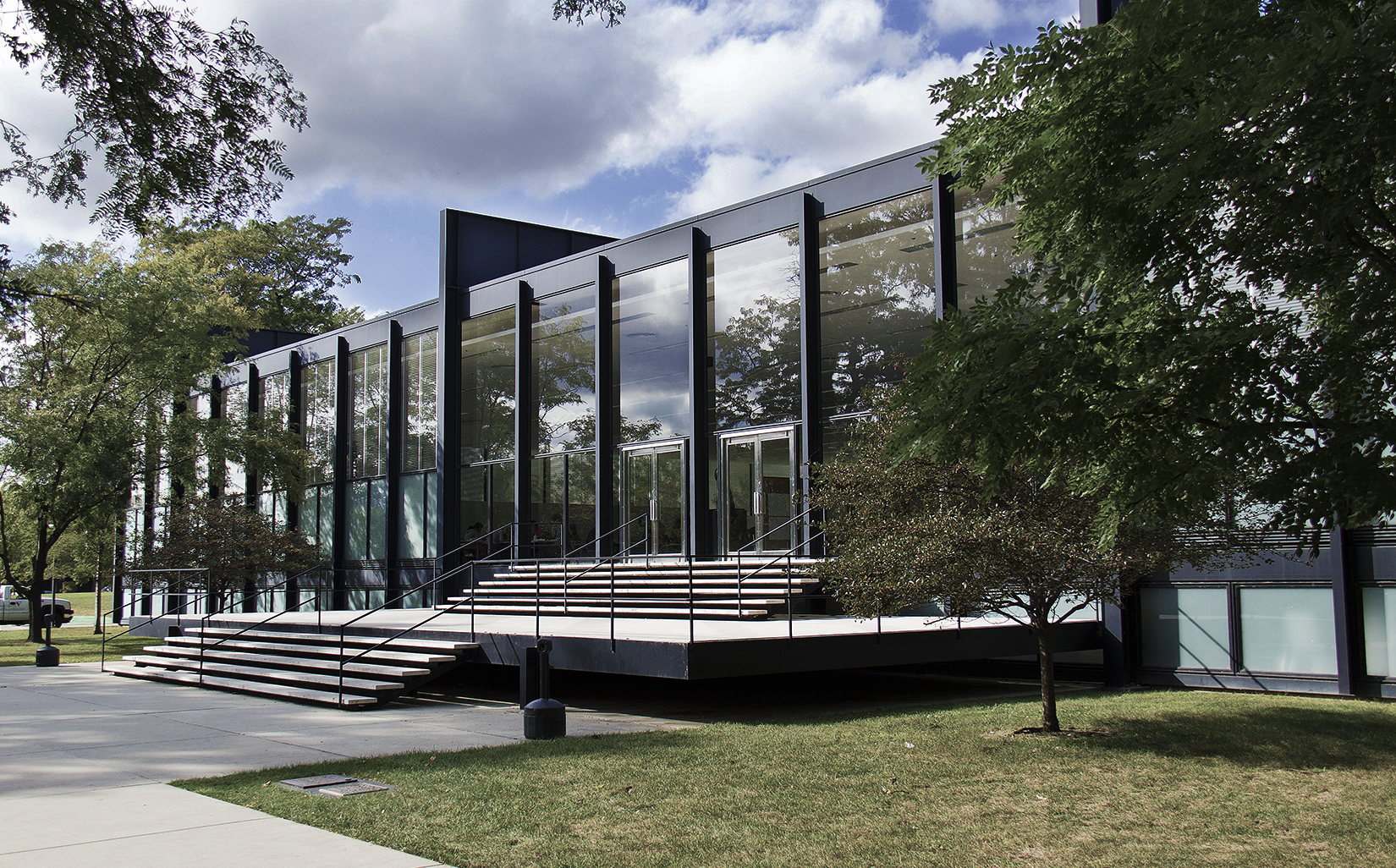

- Location within Chicago metropolitan area Location within Illinois Location within the United States
- Location: 3360 S. State Street; Chicago, Illinois, United States
- Coordinates: 41°50′00″N 87°37′38″W
- Built: 1950–1956
- Architect: Ludwig Mies van der Rohe
- Architectural style: Modernist, International Style
- Part of: Illinois Institute of Technology Academic Campus (ID05000871)
- NRHP reference No.: 01001049

Significant dates
- Added to NRHP: August 7, 2001
- Designated NHL: August 7, 2001
- Designated CP: August 12, 2005
- Designated CHICL: October 1, 1997

S. R. Crown Hall is a building on the campus of the Illinois Institute of Technology (IIT) in Chicago, Illinois, United States. Completed in 1956, the structure was designed by the architect Ludwig Mies van der Rohe for the IIT's College of Architecture, which he led for two decades. Crown Hall is a Chicago Landmark and is listed on the National Register of Historic Places as a National Historic Landmark.

The building occupies a rectangular site of 120 by 220 feet (37 m × 67 m), with its longer axis running east–west, and consists of two levels: the main story and a basement. The main level is raised 6 feet (1.8 m) and is accessed mainly from a porch to the south. The glass curtain wall is divided horizontally into three tiers of panes, interspersed with steel columns and mullions. The roof is 18 feet (5.5 m) above the main level and is supported by four girders, which rest on four pairs of columns. Inside, the main level is a mostly open plan space with half-height partitions; there are no interior columns besides two mechanical shafts. The basement consists of rooms arranged around a U-shaped corridor that links two stairways.

The site was previously occupied by Mecca Flats, which was demolished in 1952. Mies was first commissioned to design a lecture hall for IIT's architecture school in 1950. The building was named in honor of the businessman S. R. Crown, whose brothers Henry and Irving donated $250,000 for construction. (Note: Equivalent to $2,374,000 in 2025) Work began on December 2, 1954, and the building was dedicated on April 30, 1956. The windows were replaced in the 1970s, and an air-cooling system was added in the late 20th century. Extensive renovations in the 2000s fixed issues with the design, upgraded mechanical systems, and made the building more energy efficient. Over the years, the structure has received praise for its design, and numerous commentators described it as a major accomplishment by Mies. The building has also received architectural awards and has been depicted on a postage stamp.

== Site ==
S. R. Crown Hall is located at 3360 South State Street, on the campus of Illinois Institute of Technology (IIT), in the South Side of Chicago in Illinois, United States. Crown Hall occupies a rectangular site of 120 by 220 feet (37 m × 67 m), with its longer axis running east–west. Alfred Caldwell, who frequently worked with the building's architect Ludwig Mies van der Rohe, was responsible for the landscape around Crown Hall. The landscape features originally included honey locust trees surrounding the building on three sides; these trees helped cool down the windows but have since been felled. The main entrance faces south toward where 34th Street would have run. Directly west of the building is a north–south pathway and a tree-lined lawn. To the north of the building is a larger lawn that runs along the eastern side of the neighboring Siegel Hall. The Chicago "L"'s 35th–Bronzeville–IIT station is located just east of Crown Hall.

== Architecture ==
Ever since its completion in 1956, Crown Hall has been occupied by IIT's College of Architecture program. The structure was designed by Ludwig Mies van der Rohe, who directed the program from 1938 to 1958 and designed approximately 20 buildings on the campus. (Note: During his tenure, Mies is variously cited as having designed 18, 19, 20, 21, or 22 buildings for the Illinois Tech campus.) Pace Associates was the associate architect, while Frank J. Kornacker & Associates was the structural engineer. Although Crown Hall includes several design features that were commonplace in other contexts (such as plate girders, rolled steel, and welded joints), many of these features had seldom been used as they were in Crown Hall's design.

=== Exterior ===
Except for the areas around the entrances, the exterior is made entirely of steel and glass. About 285 short tons (254 long tons; 259 t) of steel was used throughout the building. Most of the steel is welded together, though some of the design elements are made of rolled steel. The exterior was originally covered with lead paint in a charcoal hue described as "Mies black"; gradual deterioration caused the paint to become gray by the 2000s. When the building was renovated in 2005, a three-layered paint was applied to the facade due to restrictions on lead-based paint in the United States. The curtain wall is composed of single-layered glass and is divided horizontally into three tiers and vertically into multiple bays.

==== Entrances ====
Crown Hall's main entrance is through the south porch, a terrace with a travertine marble floor, on the southern elevation of the facade. The south porch is placed within a steel frame, cantilevered outward from the wall. Because the porch floats above the ground, trash tends to accumulate underneath. The porch functions as an intermediate landing for two short flights of steps, which descend to the ground and ascend to the main entrance. Both flights have handrails on either side. The stairs are designed to appear as though they are floating, since there are no risers vertically separating each step. They are stylistically similar to the stairs outside Mies's Farnsworth House in Plano, Illinois. The entrance itself consists of a pair of stainless-steel doors; there is no canopy above the main entrance door, likely because it would have created a visual distraction. Architectural Forum and The New York Times described the entrance as being reminiscent of classical architecture, albeit without the elaborate design details associated with that style.

There is a rear entrance in the middle of the northern elevation, which also consists of a pair of stainless-steel doors. Flights of concrete stairs lead up from the west and east to a concrete landing, where two travertine steps lead to the rear entrance. Underneath the concrete steps are additional stairs, which lead to two sets of hollow-steel double doors in the building's basement. There are metal handrails around and along the steps.

==== Curtain wall ====
Of the three tiers of window panes, the upper and middle tiers correspond to the upper level, and the lower tier corresponds to the basement. The upper tier of windows (known as the upper lights) measures approximately 11 1/2 to 12 3/4 feet (3.5 to 3.9 m) tall, while the middle tier measures 7 3/4 feet (2.4 m) tall. (Note: While the National Park Service cites the upper tier's windows as measuring 9 7/12 by 11 1/2 feet (2.9 by 3.5 m), Architectural Record gives an alternative measurement of 9 2/3 by 12 3/4 feet (2.9 by 3.9 m) for the upper tier.) Vertical mullions, consisting of steel I-beams, divide each tier into bays measuring 10 feet (3.0 m) wide. (Note: The National Park Service gives a different width of 9 feet 7 inches (2.92 m) for the bays.) The eastern and western elevations have 11 bays, and the northern and southern elevations have 22 bays.

The original upper lights were transparent to allow students to work in sunlight. The original panes were only 1/4 inch (6.4 mm) thick, and they tended to bow inward or break during windy weather. The 1975 replacement project added new upper lights 3/8 inch (9.5 mm) thick. The 2005 replacement involved installing panes, measuring 1/2 inch (13 mm) thick, to meet modern building codes. Since conventional glass tends to become greener at higher thicknesses, the upper lights are made of low-iron glass, which does not turn green as it becomes thicker. Due to modern building-code requirements and space limitations, the tops of each pane are held in place by sloped window stops, which measure 5/8 inch (16 mm) thick at the top and 6/8 inch (19 mm) thick at the bottom. Although the stops are barely visible, they were controversial when installed, as Mies's original design did not include any diagonals or slopes. The stops are held in place by small steel fasteners.

The middle and lower tiers were originally translucent to provide some privacy and reduce distractions. Within both tiers, each bay has two panes separated by an additional mullion. In the middle tier, there are louvers or ventilation flaps at the bottom of each pane, allowing the main level to be naturally ventilated; these flaps had to be operated manually. The six center bays on this tier, next to the entrances, lack louvers and were originally transparent. The windows for the basement, the lower lights, were held in place by window stops at their tops. They doubled as clerestory windows for the basement, and they could be opened for natural ventilation. Over the years, fingerprints and common materials such as tape caused scratches and stains, so the original panes were replaced with laminated glass in 1975. During the 2005 renovation, most of the middle- and lower-tier windows were replaced again with 1/4-inch-thick (6.4 mm) panes, while transparent tempered glass was added next to the entrances. The inward-facing portions of the lower lights are sandblasted to give them a translucent effect, as this was more resilient than the original laminated glass.

==== Columns and roof ====
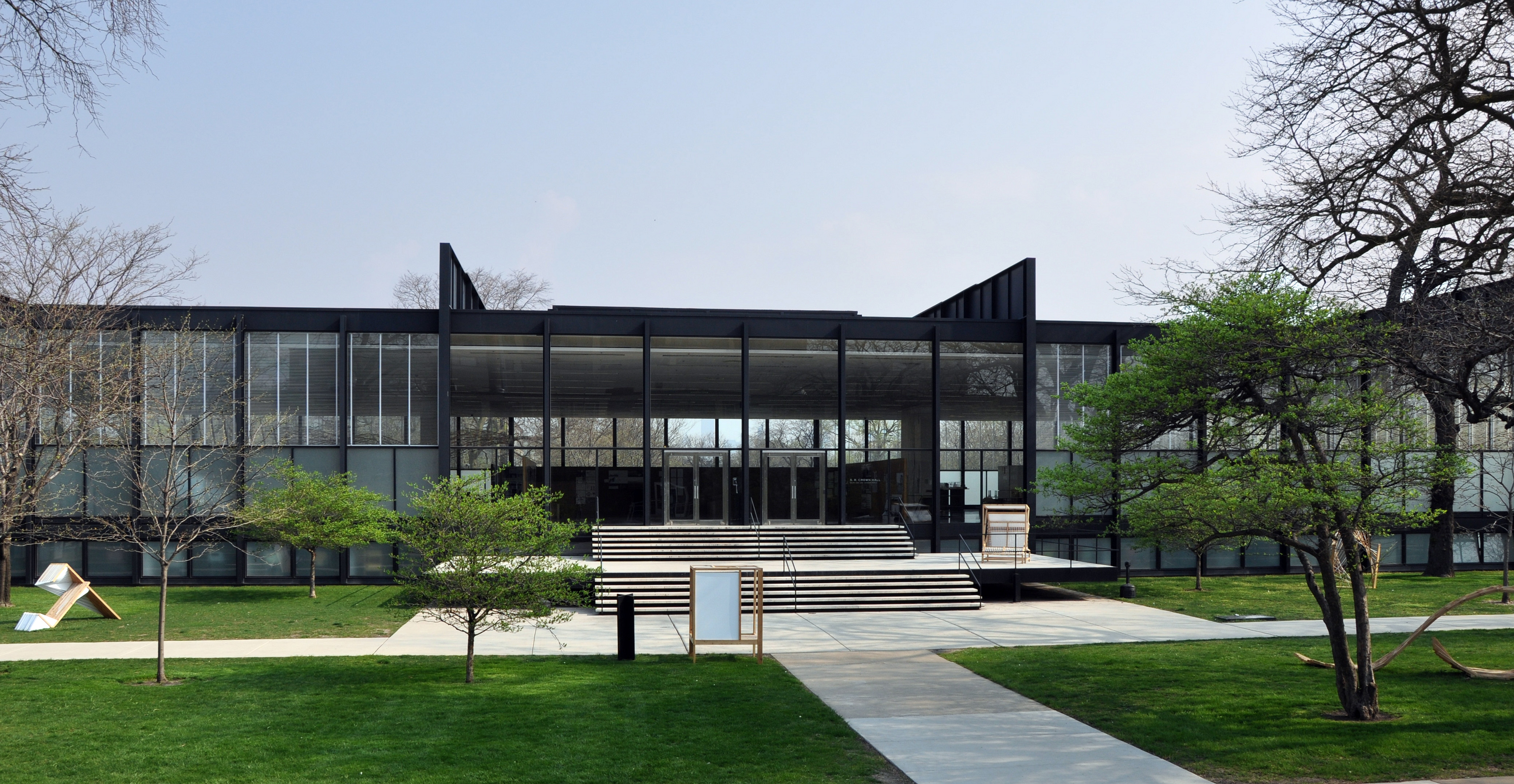
The entrance as seen from the south. Two of the roof girders are visible, one on either side of the entrance.

Unlike most other contemporary buildings, Crown Hall's entire superstructure was on its exterior and was completely visible from the outside. Crown Hall was Mies's first such design and is an early example of a clear span structure. The building is supported by H-shaped columns on the facade, which are welded to flanges along the roof and floor slab. The northern and southern elevations each have four columns; each column to the north is paired with another to the south. The columns on each elevation are spaced 60 feet (18 m) apart, and the roof is cantilevered 20 feet (6.1 m) outward from the westernmost and easternmost pairs of columns. The columns thus divide the building from west to east into a 1-3-3-3-1 configuration. The three 60-foot sections and the two 20-foot sections add up to a total building length of 220 feet (67 m).

Four steel plate girders, which run north–south between each pair of columns, carry the entire weight of the roof and are visible from the exterior of the building. Each girder measures 120 feet (37 m) long (spanning the building's entire width) and 6 1/4 feet (1.9 m) deep, while the roof itself is 18 feet (5.5 m) above the main level. (Note: An Architectural Forum article from 1956 gives a conflicting figure of 19.5 feet (5.9 m).) By suspending the roof from the girders, Mies eliminated the need for interior columns and created an open plan space. The roof itself is made of gravel and asphalt, with interior drains and an aluminum (originally copper) coping at its perimeter. In the center of the roof is a penthouse for mechanical functions. The penthouse measures 40 by 40 feet (12 by 12 m) across, with louvers on its western and eastern elevations, as well as translucent panels on the other elevations. There is also a photovoltaic power station on the roof, as well as a battery energy storage system that can store up to 500 kilowatt-hours (1,800 MJ) of energy.

=== Interior ===
The interior spans around 52,000 to 53,000 square feet (4,800 to 4,900 m^{2}). It is split between the main level and a basement. Each floor has a gross floor area of approximately 26,400 square feet (2,450 m^{2}) (Note: This is the exact area of a rectangle measuring 120 by 220 feet (37 m × 67 m). However, a figure of 26,000 square feet (2,400 m^{2}) has also been given.) and is arranged on a grid of squares measuring 10 feet (3.0 m) on each side. Like many of Mies's other works, which had a floating quality because they were placed slightly above ground, the main level of the building was placed 6 feet (1.8 m) above ground to create a raised basement. City building codes at the time of Crown Hall's construction required that multi-story buildings have concrete fireproofing, but since Crown Hall has one above-ground story, the metal was allowed to be left exposed.

When Crown Hall was built, the windows provided natural ventilation, and a hot-air system heated the building. The hot-air system consists of diffusers in the ceiling and a radiant heating system embedded into the main level's concrete floor. However, an air-conditioning system was not installed until later (despite being part of the original plan). Instead, Venetian blinds ventilated the upper level.

==== Main level ====
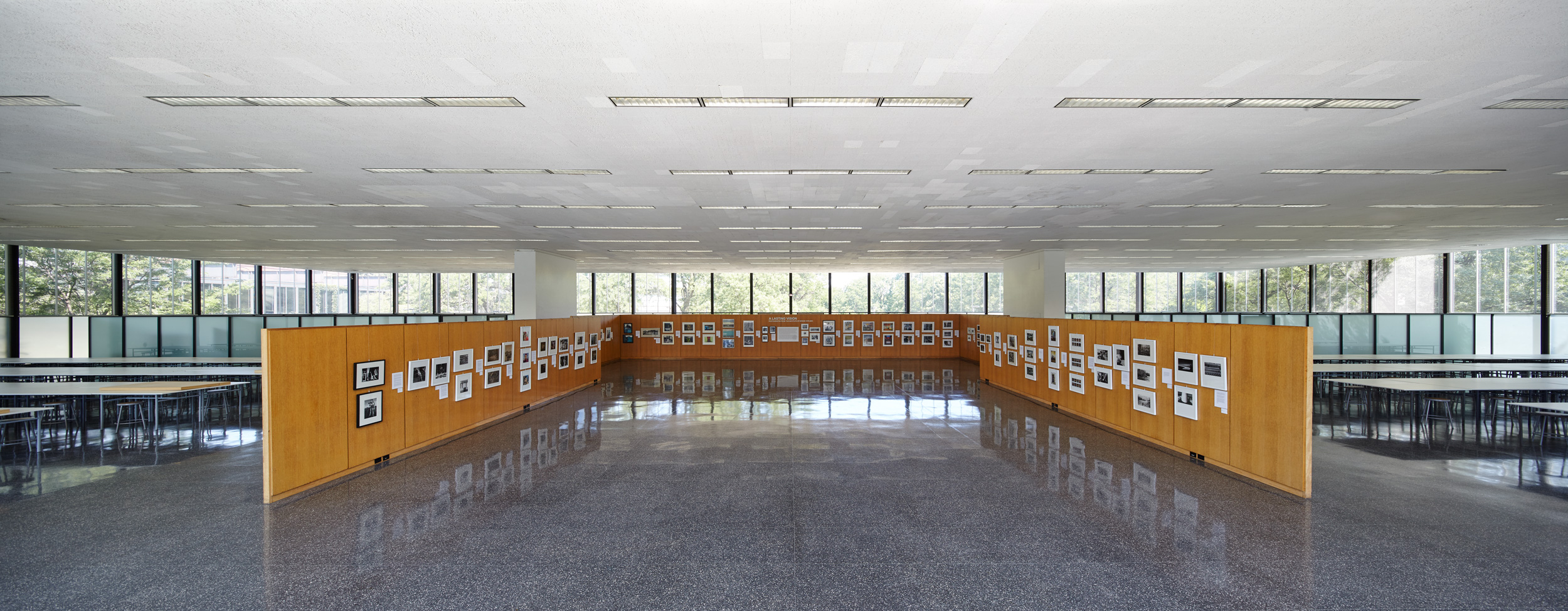
The interior of the main floor, with half-height wooden partitions surrounding the exhibition space near the main entrance

The main level occupies the building's entire site of 120 by 220 feet (37 by 67 m) and is arranged on a north–south axis, flanked by eastern and western wings. Arranged in a roughly symmetrical layout, it was the largest interior space that Mies designed in his lifetime. Its open plan, suitable for a myriad of uses, made it the first "universal space" that Mies designed in his career. The open plan may have been in part inspired by Museum for a Small City, a 1942 design for a building with a single large room that could be adapted to multiple uses. Mies used details from the Museum for a Small City design not only at Crown Hall, but also in his earlier Farnsworth House and his later Neue Nationalgalerie.

The main level has terrazzo floor tiles measuring 2.5 by 5 feet (0.76 by 1.52 m), which consists of an aggregate made of cement binder and pieces of gray and black marble. Two staircases to the basement, set back about 40 feet (12 m) from the southern facade, are placed 50 feet (15 m) apart from each other and have terrazzo treads and metal railings. The ceiling is composed of square acoustic tiles, each measuring 1 by 1 foot (0.30 by 0.30 m) across. The tiles are interspersed with fluorescent light tubes, sprinklers, and ventilation openings, which are grouped in fours. The ceiling is surrounded by a soffit that is recessed 1 foot (0.30 m) from the facade.

The main level has no obstructions other than two service shafts and several low partition walls. The oak partitions do not reach the ceiling, giving the impression that the different parts of the room blend into one another; instead, they reach a height of approximately 8 feet (2.4 m). The partitions have hardwood borders and plywood finishes. Near the main (south) entrance are two 35-foot-long (11 m) partitions, which are spaced 45 feet (14 m) apart and adjoin the staircases to the basement. These form the western and eastern walls of an exhibition space. A third wall to the north separates the exhibition space from another space that was originally occupied by administrative offices. Near the main level's northern wall are the two service shafts, described as "chases", which are spaced 80 feet (24 m) apart. The chases, set back about 40 feet from the northern facade, are made of clay tiles and have terrazzo bases and plaster capitals.

==== Basement ====
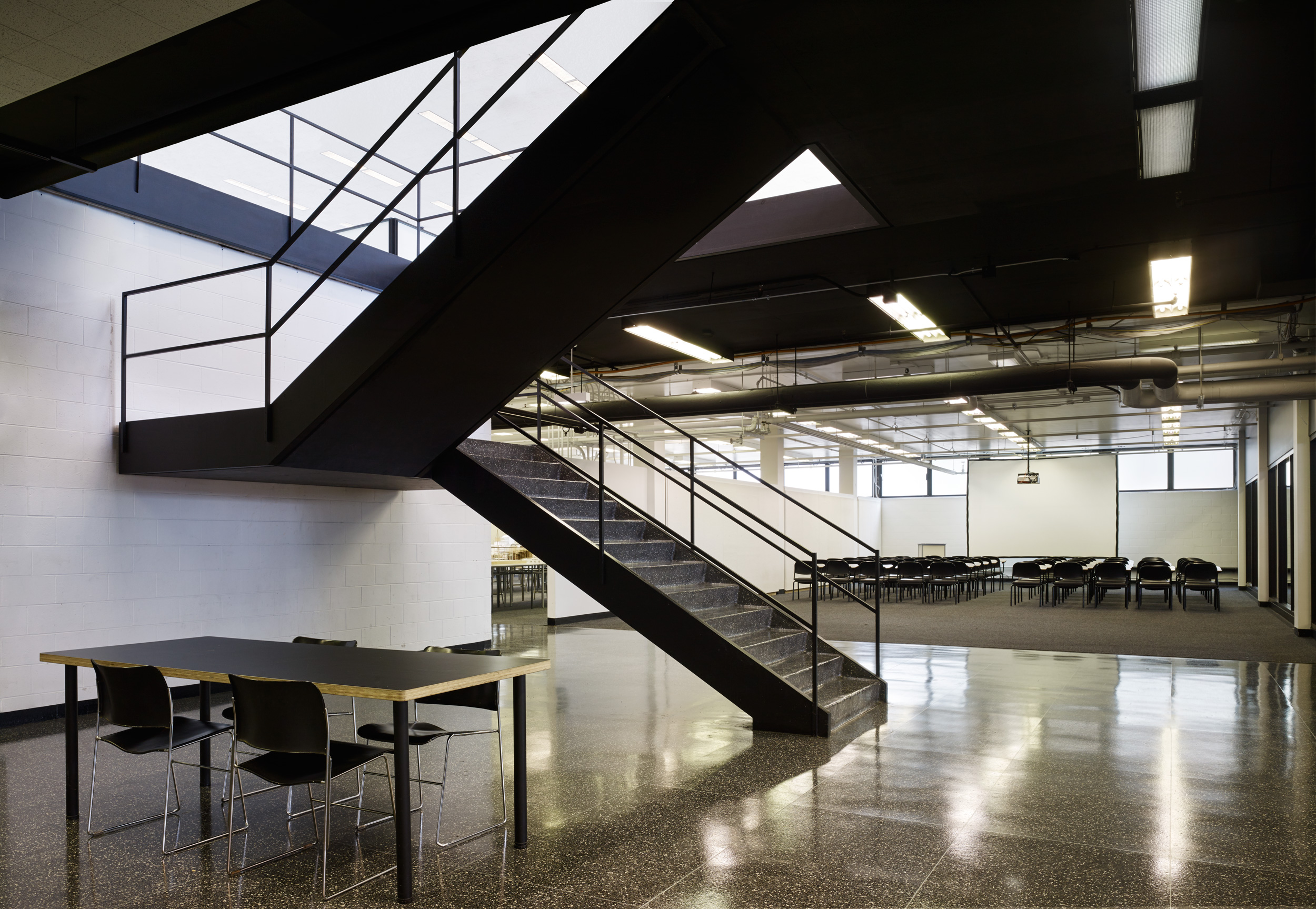
The bottom of one of the stairs leading to the basement

The basement is divided into numerous spaces such as lecture rooms, bathrooms, and service rooms. Originally used by IIT's design department, it has also housed the building's administrative offices since the 1980s. These spaces are arranged around a U-shaped corridor, which runs between the entrances at the north end of the building; the south end of the corridor connects the two staircases from the main level. The basement generally has concrete-block walls and concrete ceilings with fluorescent tube lights. The floors near the stairs and in the corridor are made of terrazzo, while the rest of the floor is made of tiles. Internally, the lower-level spaces are divided into modules of 20 by 30 feet (6.1 by 9.1 m), corresponding to six squares.

As originally laid out, most of the student spaces in the basement were workshops, except for one room used as a lecture room, and another used for storage and desk space. The workshops had sinks, and there were also shelves constructed by students (the rooms originally had no furniture at all). The offices, lecture rooms, studios, and workshop rooms are placed on the perimeter of the U-shaped corridor, while the bathrooms and service spaces are placed along the corridor's interior wall. Since 1990, the southern side of the basement has housed the IIT College of Architecture's library, the Graham Resource Center; this space is separated from the stairs by a glass wall.

== History ==
The Illinois Institute of Technology Academic Campus was built on the site of a predominantly African-American neighborhood. The Crown Hall site, specifically, previously contained the Mecca Flats. Originally built as a hotel for visitors to the World's Columbian Exposition, the building was converted to apartments and housed mostly middle-class black families, with as many as 1,500 residents at its peak. IIT acquired Mecca Flats in April 1941 with plans to clear the site for the new campus. Renters' court judge Samuel Heller prevented the tenants' eviction in 1943, citing the wartime housing shortage. IIT continued to own Mecca Flats but did not re-rent apartments after tenants had moved away. After sufficient tenants had moved away, IIT announced plans to clear the site again in 1950 and razed it in 1952.

The architect Ludwig Mies van der Rohe became the architectural director for Armour College in 1938; the college merged with the Lewis Institute to form IIT in 1940. Mies was commissioned to design a new campus for Armour, and later IIT, in the Near South Side section of South Chicago. Lacking a suitable building, IIT's architecture school was temporarily housed in the Art Institute of Chicago for two decades. The other buildings on campus are placed on a symmetrical grid, with small parks between each building, and were built predominantly of brick, glass, and steel. Mies's earlier buildings were designed around a grid of rectangular prisms measuring 12 by 24 by 24 feet (3.7 m × 7.3 m × 7.3 m) across. These buildings were generally no more than four stories high, with corners made of I-beams.

=== Development ===
==== Plans and initial design ====
Mies was first commissioned to design a lecture hall for IIT's architecture school in 1950, sketching a cursory drawing that year to help raise funds for the hall. At the time, Mies was designing fewer residential buildings and more institutional and commercial buildings. He simultaneously drew plans for a Mannheim National Theatre building and a convention center in Chicago, which used similar design elements to Crown Hall, although neither was ever built. Preliminary plans for what became Crown Hall depicted a building supported by internal columns. The first drawings attributed specifically to Crown Hall were drawn up between May and October 1952. This design called for a rectangular three-story structure built on a 15×16 grid of squares, with a windowless basement, a main story at ground level, and a mezzanine above the middle of the building. The facade would have had a brick band course running horizontally across the building, except at the main entrance, which would have been on the shorter axis.

In June 1953, Mies completed the initial floor plans for the basement and main story, but not the mezzanine. The proportions of the building were different from those of all the previous buildings on campus. The main level would be a central space for offices and exhibitions, flanked by two workspaces of equal size, one each for the architecture school and the design institute. Further revisions to the plans took place throughout the year; for example, Mies arranged the basement's rooms around a U-shaped corridor and eliminated the brick on the facade. In addition, the support columns were all repositioned to the exterior. IIT's buildings and grounds committee was initially reluctant to approve the plans, but this changed when the college hired a new publicist. After the publicist picked up a scale model of the building, he decided that the project should be funded; as Mies later said, "You get money only for interesting things, not stupid things."

==== Fundraising and construction ====
IIT president John Rettaliata announced plans for a building for the college's departments of architecture, design, and urban planning in May 1954, and IIT began raising $600,000 for the building the next month. (Note: Equivalent to $5,699,000 in 2025) Mies presented plans for a two-story glass and steel structure with a roof supported by exterior columns, eliminating the need for interior columns. Further revisions to the plans took place between August and October. Henry and Irving Crown of the Material Service Corporation, the owners of the Merchandise Mart and Empire State Building, donated $250,000 for the project in October 1954. Following the Crowns' donation, the structure was renamed in honor of their brother S. R. Crown, who had led that company before dying in 1921. More than a thousand donors contributed the remaining cost, giving between $5 and $18,000 apiece. (Note: Equivalent to $47–171,000 in 2025) The architect Raphael N. Friedman convinced officials in the building industry to donate to the building's construction.

The plans were approved by November, and construction began on December 2, 1954. By then, the construction cost had increased to $775,000. (Note: Equivalent to $7,361,000 in 2025) IIT had raised $400,000 for construction by early 1955. (Note: Equivalent to $3,747,000 in 2025) Initially, work was supposed to be completed in July, but part of the concrete floor deck caught fire and partly collapsed in March 1955, delaying the building's completion. The steelwork cost $76,000, or $267 per short ton ($294/t). (Note: Equivalent to $712,000 in 2025. The equivalent cost per short ton is $2,501 ($2,754 per metric ton).) Each of the roof girders was manufactured in sections measuring 60 feet (18 m) long and then installed using cranes.

The details of the main floor's layout were finalized in August 1955. When the building was nearing completion, IIT applied for a certificate of occupancy. The building inspector, saying that Crown Hall was unlike any other classroom structure he had ever seen, classified it as an industrial building solely based on its size. This classification required that the structure be outfitted with emergency sprinklers, which increased the building's cost by an extra $30,000. (Note: Equivalent to $272,000 in 2025) Sources disagree on whether the building ultimately cost $746,850, (Note: Equivalent to $6,765,000 in 2025) or $800,000. (Note: Equivalent to $7,246,000 in 2025) IIT estimated that the presence of Crown Hall and two new dormitories would allow the university to accommodate 7,300 students in 1956, an increase of 600 from the previous year.

=== Late 20th century ===
==== Opening and early years ====
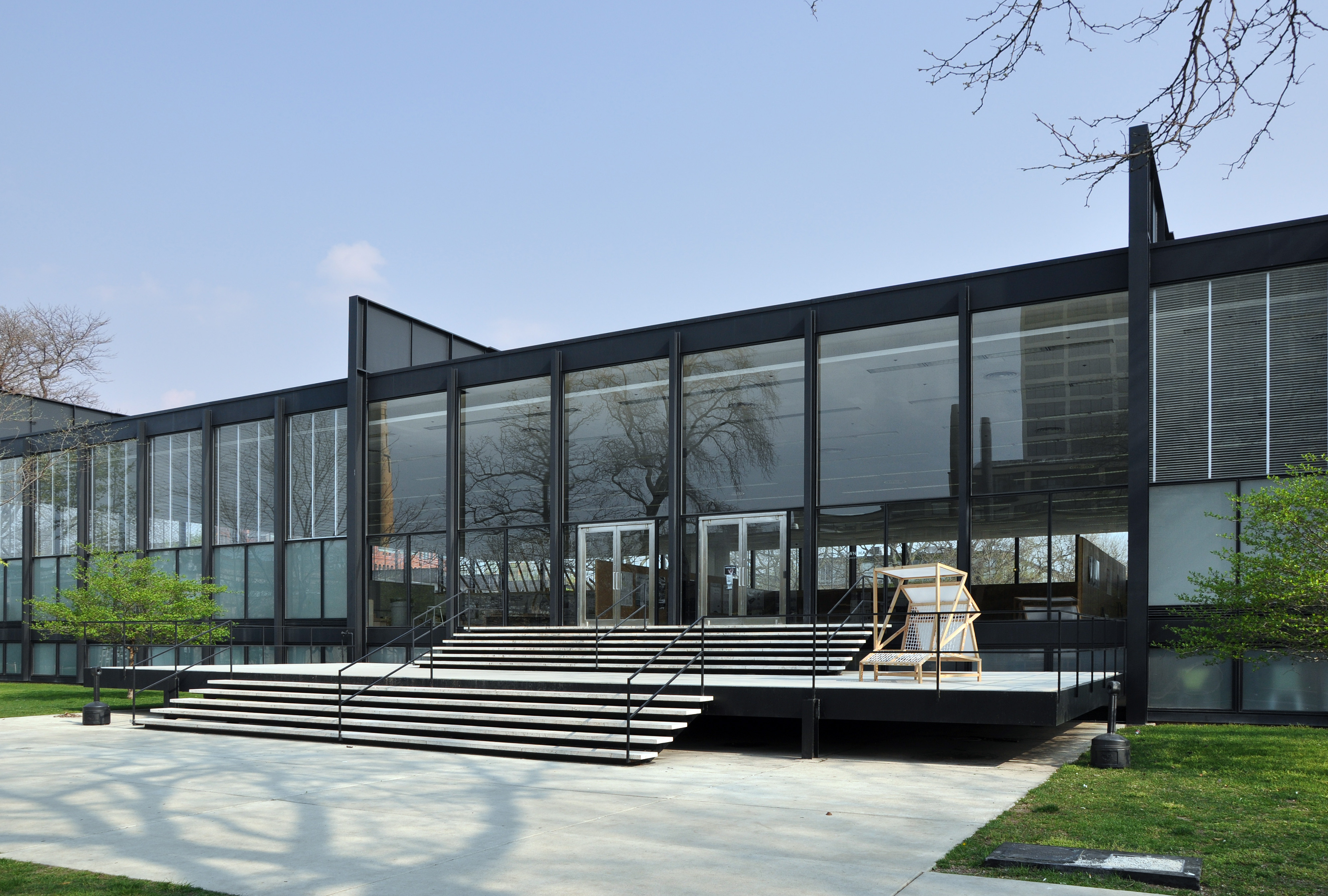
When the building opened, Mies described it as "the clearest structure we have done, the best to express our philosophy".

The building was dedicated on April 30, 1956, with speeches from the industrial designer Henry Dreyfuss, the architect Eero Saarinen, and the city planner Walter H. Blucher. Contemporary media wrote that the campus around Crown Hall still had many "derelict buildings awaiting eventual destruction". Crown Hall was variously described as the 19th or 20th building at IIT's South Chicago campus. Mies described it as "the clearest structure we have done, the best to express our philosophy", and he reportedly liked Crown Hall more than any other design he was responsible for. Crown Hall was among Mies's later structures at IIT, as he retired two years after the building's completion. When the Royal Institute of British Architects gave him a gold medal in 1959, Mies said of Crown Hall: "It is beautiful... I like to work in this building." Mies further recalled that the building's acoustics were rarely disrupted except when professors yelled, and that he frequently could not see others behind the partitions.

From the outset, Mies had intended the building as a place for collaboration and education. The biographer Franz Schulze described Crown Hall as a "perfect setting for a school of Baukunst", or building art. The building housed IIT's architecture, design, and city-planning departments; the architecture department used the main level, while the other departments were relegated to the basement. The workshops on either side of the main level's core had drafting tables designed by Mies, and the core itself contained an exhibition area to the south and offices to the north. Students at Crown Hall drew up sketches and constructed rudimentary structures. Nearly a decade after Mies's retirement, in 1966, the writer Wolf Von Eckardt said that it was uncanny "to see Mies' life work reflected all over in precise and miniature images" at Crown Hall.

The upper level's open-plan layout made it suitable for a myriad of uses; as Mies said facetiously, "This building could be a nightclub on Saturday night and a garage on Sunday morning." As such, it hosted events such as exhibitions, receptions, banquets, and dances. Among the exhibitions Crown Hall hosted in its early years were showcases of artwork by Frederick Sommer, exhibits of German fine art, photographs by Harry Callahan, displays of Bauhaus architectural works, and objects salvaged from streets and trash dumps. Its other events included a science fair, a jazz concert by Duke Ellington and his orchestra, and a memorial service for Mies after the architect's death in 1969. Multiple classes often took place simultaneously in the upper level; one of Mies's collaborators, Peter Carter, said the design allowed students to be more deeply immersed in the curriculum. The interior was often noisy because the half-height partitions allowed sound to carry over to other parts of the building.

==== Modifications ====
As originally designed, the windows were shaded by nearby trees, minimizing solar gain inside. However, the windows tended to bend or break during high winds, and students stayed away from the windows during windstorms as a result. Skidmore, Owings, & Merrill were hired to replace all the windows in 1975. As part of the project, the original panes were replaced with laminated glass, though these ended up absorbing rather than reflecting heat. In 1978, IIT announced that it would upgrade Crown Hall's lighting and replace the roof and ceiling. The building continued to host events such as an exhibit of unusual designs. a showcase of Mies's work in honor of his 100th birthday in 1986, and an auction of items designed by Mies.

The hot-air circulation system was also retrofitted to provide cool air in 1986. The original hot-air system distributed air through diffusers in the ceiling, but the modifications meant that the diffusers blasted cold air at students sitting directly underneath. In addition, because of the presence of the cool-air system, students and staff stopped using the window louvers, which fell into disrepair. The original trees around the building, which had provided shade, either died due to disease or were felled to make way for paths. By the mid-1990s, IIT wanted to add computers to Crown Hall, which required reconfiguring the hall to accommodate electrical outlets. When computers were installed, this worsened heat gain in the building, while glare emerged as an additional problem. Simultaneously, IIT leadership were also considering a wider-ranging renovation of Crown Hall. By then, the building and others on the IIT campus were in poor shape; for instance, the ceiling above Crown Hall's main level was tattered.

=== 21st century ===
==== Renovation plans ====
Crown Hall continued to accommodate architecture students in the 21st century. When the building was designated as a U.S. National Historic Landmark in 2001, it received a $250,000 conservation grant from the Getty Institute, (Note: Equivalent to $433,000 in 2025) which was intended to fund a renovation of the building's facade. Crown Hall had previously secured a combined $500,000 from foundations operated by the Crown and Pritzker families. (Note: Equivalent to $867,000 in 2025) IIT and former Illinois Governor James R. Thompson announced plans in late 2002 to raise $20 million to renovate Crown Hall and the nearby Wishnick Hall. (Note: Equivalent to $34,167,000 in 2025) In addition, the Council on Tall Buildings and Urban Habitat opened a small office at Crown Hall in 2003.

Under the tenure of Donna Robertson, the School of Architecture's dean, Krueck and Sexton Architects began designing a renovation of Crown Hall in 2003. They discovered evidence of extensive deterioration in the steel frame and the windows, including corrosion caused by inadequate drainage and failing sealant joints. Complaints of drafts and overheating—with summer temperatures reaching 86 °F (30 °C)—led IIT to hire two engineers to investigate. They discovered that many of the original decorative details had fallen into disrepair, and that the removal of trees and the 1970s window replacements had worsened the building's energy efficiency. The building was also consuming excessive energy; one restoration architect recalled finding that some of the lights had been turned on for several years.

==== Renovation and later years ====
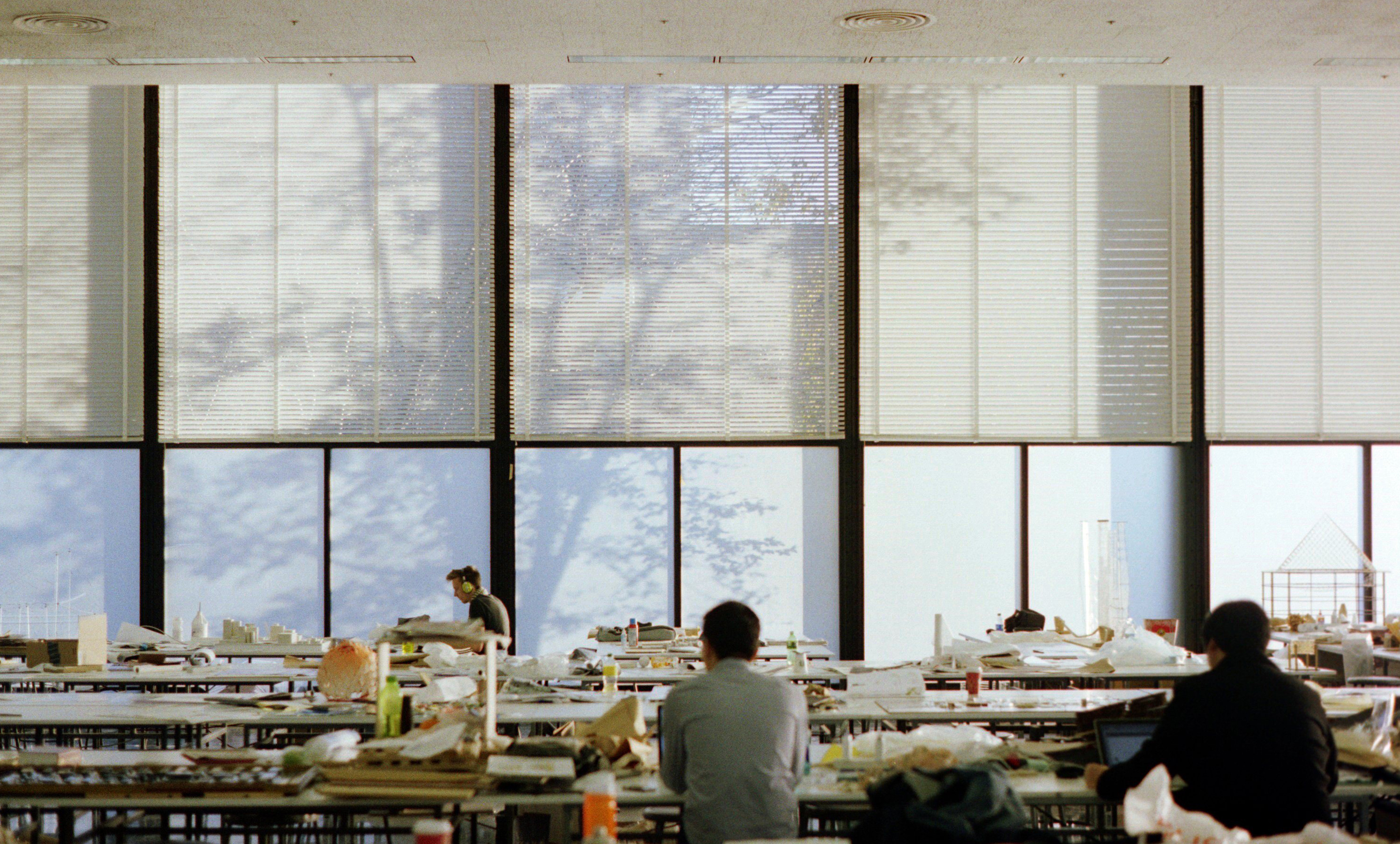
Interior of a workspace on the main level. The transparent upper-tier windows are seen at the top, while the translucent middle-tier windows are at the bottom (behind the students and desks).

The renovation was divided into four phases. The first phase cost $2.2 million (Note: Equivalent to $3,480,000 in 2025) and involved upgrading Crown Hall's wiring, rebuilding the restrooms, and making the building accessible. To raise money, IIT held an eBay auction for the right to smash one of the building's old windows. Mies's grandson, the architect Dirk Lohan, submitted the winning bid of $2,705; (Note: Equivalent to $4,280 in 2025) he was invited to break the window on May 17, 2005, during a ceremony that marked the beginning of the renovation's second phase. The second phase was overseen by Krueck and Sexton, with Gunny Harboe as the conservation consultant and Clune Construction as the general contractor. The lead paint was removed, the steel was repainted black, and new glass panels resembling the original windows were installed. The blinds and doors were also replaced. The second phase took 15 weeks with a budget of $3.6 million. (Note: Equivalent to $5,694,000 in 2025) The curtain-wall replacement was ultimately completed in August 2005, before the beginning of the academic year.

The subsequent phases included re-landscaping the site and upgrading the mechanical systems. The south porch's travertine-marble surface was also replaced. The original travertine had developed cracks due to Chicago's climate, which had caused the marble to freeze and thaw repeatedly, but rather than using a more resilient material, conservators opted to replicate the original material. By 2007 and 2008, workers were re-landscaping the area around Crown Hall. The mechanical system upgrades were necessitated in part because the windows could not be double-glazed or otherwise altered to provide additional insulation. The project reduced the building's energy use by an estimated 60%.

After the building's renovation, Crown Hall hosted events such as an exhibition of works by the Adler & Sullivan architectural firm, as well as a celebration of Mies's 121st birthday. When Wiel Arets became the dean of the College of Architecture in 2012, he removed the lockers and replaced the dean's office in the basement with a new office on the main floor. In July 2018, remnants of the former Mecca Flats' basement floor were discovered next to Crown Hall while workers were installing a pipe next to the building; objects from the excavation were later displayed at Crown Hall. A battery storage system and photovoltaic array were installed on the roof in 2020. IIT received $250,000 in 2024 to restore Crown Hall's main entrance as part of an $8 million grant given to 13 Chicago Landmark buildings.

== Reception and impact ==
=== Architectural commentary ===
When the building was finished, Architectural Forum said the design was evidence of Mies's "ability to build a remarkable architectural atmosphere" and that the design's simplicity belied its elegance. Architectural Record praised the uniform size of the bays but found the interior design to be only incidental to the building's intended use, while the writer Peter Blake said that the building deviated so sharply from the principle of functionalism that it could be used for anything. Life magazine wrote that Mies had achieved "shining spaciousness" in Crown Hall's design. The Chicago Defender said in 1962 that Crown Hall "put Chicago on the architectural map for all time", and Reyner Banham, a British architecture critic, deemed the building "a crystal casket of meditative calm". In 1964, the historian Carl W. Condit said that the building was "a technical masterpiece of pure geometric form" because of its simple glass-and-steel design and exposed superstructure. Conversely, one commentator criticized Crown Hall for its unconventional superstructure, though a writer for The New Leader said that the critic's review ignored the fact that "virtually none of Mies' buildings is quite what it appears to be".

In later years, Crown Hall became a popular site for adherents of Mies. A writer for The New York Times said in 1982 that the building "appears to do no more than enclose space", while David A. Spaeth wrote that "Mies challenged the limits of structure and technology" in designing Crown Hall. Other writers, including Mies biographer Franz Schulze and Chicago Tribune architecture critic Paul Gapp, said that Crown Hall exemplified Mies's less-is-more ethos, even as Gapp regarded the building as not being ideal for its intended purpose. A writer for Architectural Record described Crown Hall in 2004 as having a "stripped-to-fundamentals grandeur". The Toronto Star said that architecture students at Crown Hall "add what Mies left out, i.e. clutter, messiness and vitality", while Herbert Muschamp of The New York Times called it "a classical temple remade for modern times". When Crown Hall was renovated in the 2000s, a writer for Artforum magazine said that it was an example of how a properly executed restoration project "is an act of exegesis in which even the smallest moves are interpretative". A USA Today writer in 2017 described the building as a prime example of mid-century modern architecture. In 2026, Luxus Magazine described the design as "a playground for light, flexibility, and education".

A writer for Interiors magazine wrote in 2000 that Mies's American portfolio "reached an expressive peak" in Crown Hall's design, with exterior and interior blending into one another. The preservation group Docomomo International described the building in 2017 as one of Mies's "supreme achievements", while other writers called Crown Hall the campus's best building. In a report about the building, Project, Progress, Architecture magazine wrote in 2010 that the design "reveals [Mies's] main architectural approaches and grasps concepts such as 'universal space'." Time magazine named Crown Hall one of the world's best buildings in 2004, describing it as "one of the world's most influential, inspiring and astonishing structures". A writer for the Pittsburgh Tribune-Review called it one of Mies's three greatest accomplishments from the 1950s, along with the Farnsworth House and the Seagram Building. Schulze regarded the building as one of Mies's "masterpieces".

=== Awards and landmark designations ===
When Crown Hall was completed, it received a citation of merit from the American Institute of Architects' Chicago chapter and the Chicago Association of Commerce. The Commission on Chicago Landmarks recommended in 1996 that both the exterior and interior be granted municipal landmark status; this contrasted with most Chicago Landmark buildings, which received only exterior protection. Crown Hall was named a Chicago Landmark on October 1, 1997, and the landmark commission's chairman called it "universally recognized symbol of an entire period of architecture". It was added to the National Register of Historic Places (NRHP) as a National Historic Landmark in August 2001 because of its architectural significance, and particularly because it was associated with Mies's role as the leader of IIT's architecture school. At the time, NRHP listings were generally required to be at least 50 years old, but the building was only 45 years old. The remainder of the IIT Main Campus was entered into the NRHP in 2005.

=== Architectural influence and media ===
After designing Crown Hall, Mies went on to design Cullinan Hall at the Museum of Fine Arts, Houston, which had similar design features. The clear-span roof and steel-and-glass facade helped influence later buildings such as the Chicago Federal Center post office and Berlin's Neue Nationalgalerie. Several works by the architect Glenn Murcutt, such as the Laurie Short House and Magney House, were described as having been inspired by Crown Hall and other Miesian works. Skidmore, Owings, & Merrill, who took over as IIT's architect after Mies's retirement in 1958, designed several buildings that alluded to the architecture of Crown Hall. Conversely, Crown Hall's plain design contrasted with the curved facade of a residential complex designed by Helmut Jahn and built across State Street in 2003.

In 1982, to honor Mies's designs, the United States Postal Service issued a stamp depicting Crown Hall; the stamp, part of a series honoring American architects, was designed by Walter D. Richards. On March 27, 2012, Mies's 126th birthday, Google commemorated the building and its architect with a Google doodle of Crown Hall. In addition, the building is the namesake of the Mies Crown Hall Americas Prize, an architecture award that was first issued in 2014 and has been awarded every two years since then. Crown Hall has been depicted in art as well, including the 1978 photomontage Titanic by the architect Stanley Tigerman and photographs by Balthazar Korab.

== See also ==
- List of Chicago Landmarks
- List of National Historic Landmarks in Illinois
- National Register of Historic Places listings in South Side Chicago
