= Federal Aviation Administration Records Center =

- Federal Aviation Administration; Records Center
- U.S. National Register of Historic Places
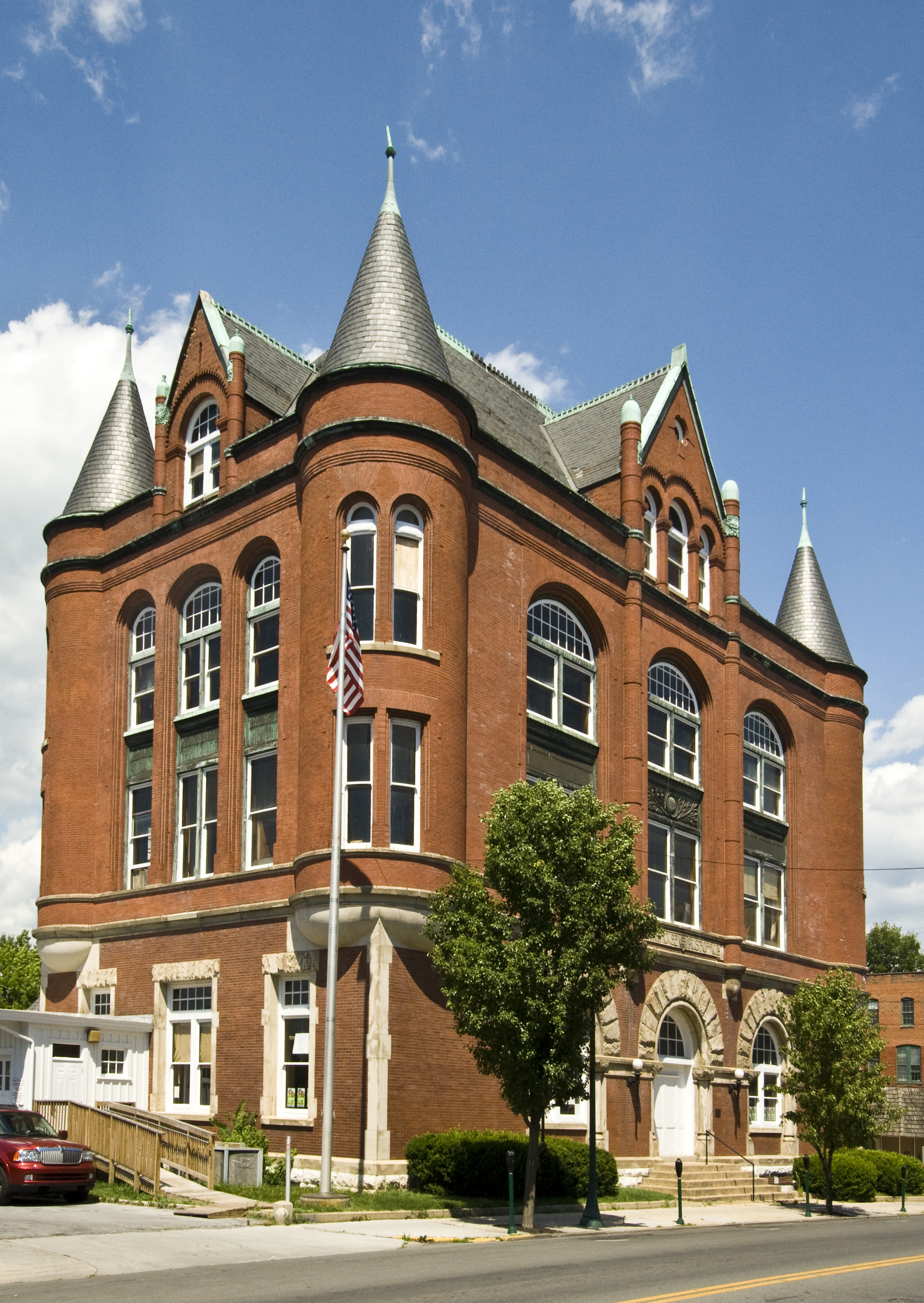

- Location within West Virginia Location within the United States
- Location: 300 W. King St., Martinsburg, West Virginia
- Coordinates: 39.4569°N 77.9667°W
- Built: 1892
- Architect: Willoughby J. Edbrooke
- Architectural style: Richardsonian Romanesque
- Website: http://www.theartcentre.org
- NRHP reference No.: 74001995
- Added to NRHP: September 10, 1974

The Federal Aviation Administration Records Center in Martinsburg, West Virginia is the former United States Courthouse and Post Office for the city. It is a Richardson Romanesque style building, principally designed by Willoughby J. Edbrooke, of the Office of the Supervising Architect. It was used as a federal courthouse and post office from 1895 to 1961, when both functions moved across the street to a new facility. The building to some extent resembles Henry Hobson Richardson's now-destroyed Cincinnati Chamber of Commerce Building.

The Federal Aviation Administration occupied the building in 1970, primarily as an emergency relocation center for Washington-based operations, then vacated the building in the 1990s. The blast-resistant construction and communications facilities are still visible in the basement. During the Cold War, the Justice Department and essential operations staff of the Federal Bureau of Investigation planned to use the building's top floors as an emergency relocation center.

The building was partly renovated as an arts center. It is part of the Downtown Martinsburg Historic District and was listed on the National Register of Historic Places in 1974.
