= Cindy Pritzker =

American philanthropist

- Born: Marian Friend; December 15, 1923; Chicago, Illinois, U.S.
- Died: March 15, 2025 (aged 101); Chicago, Illinois, U.S.
- Education: Grinnell College
- Occupation: Philanthropist
- Spouse: Jay Pritzker
- Children: 5 (including Thomas, John, Daniel, Gigi)
- Parent(s): Hugo Friend (father); Sadie Cohn (mother)

Marian "Cindy" Pritzker (née Friend; December 15, 1923 – March 15, 2025) was an American philanthropist. She headed the Chicago Public Library board and co-founded the Pritzker Architecture Prize. As the wife of Jay Pritzker, the co-founder of Hyatt Hotels, she was the matriarch of the Pritzker family.

== Early life, family, and education ==
Pritzker was born on December 15, 1923 to Judge Hugo Friend, a Cook County circuit judge, and Sadie Cohn Friend. She grew up in Kenwood on the South Side of Chicago and attended Hyde Park High School. She graduated from Grinnell College in Iowa.

== Philanthropy ==
In 1984, Pritzker was appointed to the Chicago Public Library Board by Mayor Harold Washington. She served as the board's president and led an effort to build the Harold Washington Library Center, which opened in 1991. Pritzker was also the founding chairwoman of the Chicago Public Library Foundation.

Together with her husband, she co-founded the Pritzker Architecture Prize in 1979. Following her husband's death in 1999, she commissioned the architect Frank Gehry to design the Jay Pritzker Pavilion in Millennium Park.

In 1996, she and her husband received the National Building Museum's Honor Award.

== Personal life ==
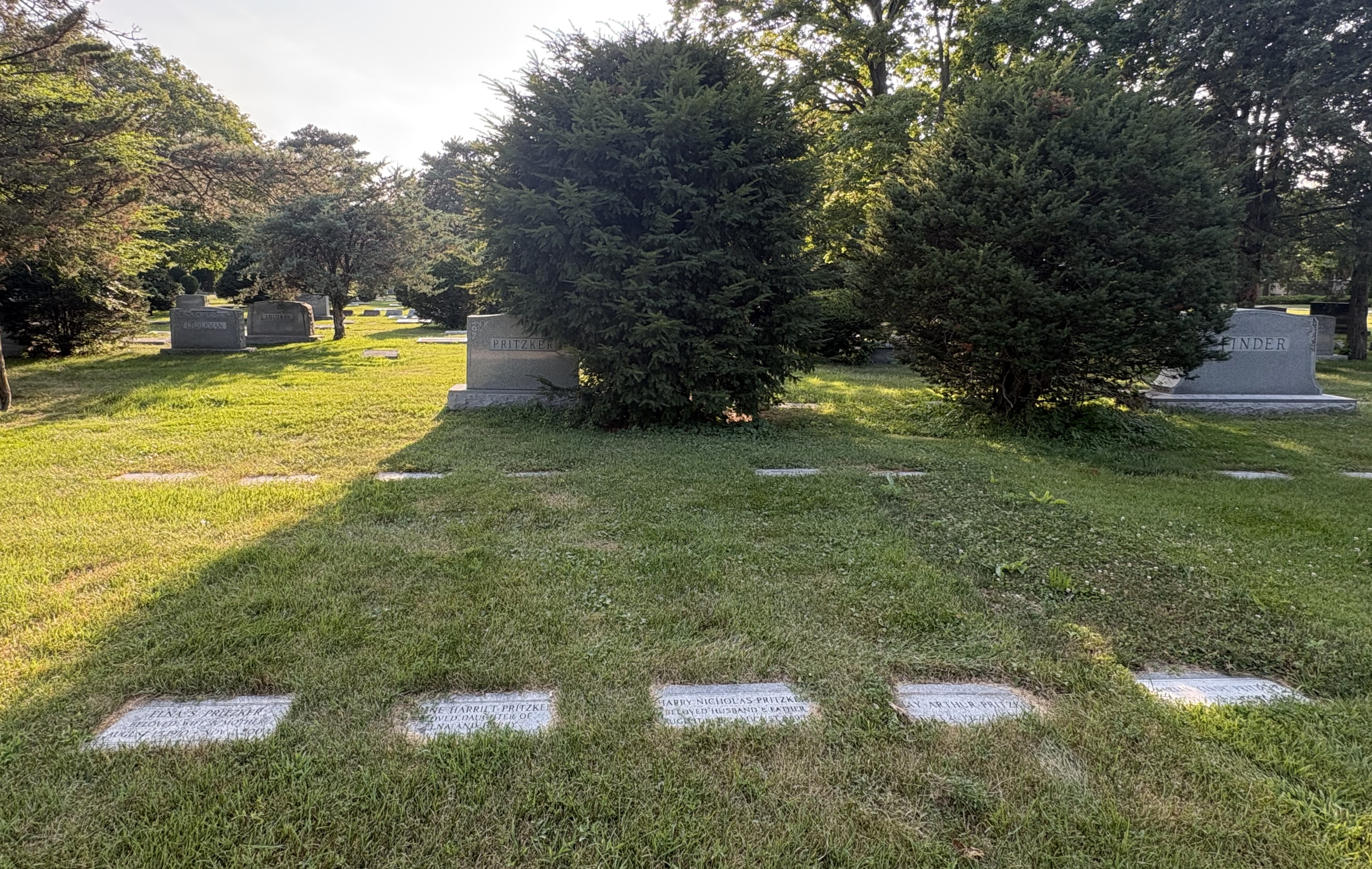
Pritzker's grave (front row, rightmost) at Memorial Park Cemetery

She married billionaire businessman Jay Pritzker, a founder of Hyatt, on August 31, 1947, and had five children, including Thomas Pritzker, John Pritzker, Daniel Pritzker, and Gigi Pritzker. She and her husband met as teenagers while vacationing at their families' lake houses in Eagle River, Wisconsin. Her husband died in 1999.

Pritzker was the aunt of Illinois Governor JB Pritzker, whom she raised following the death of his father, Donald.

She died on March 15, 2025, at the age of 101, and was buried at Memorial Park Cemetery in Skokie.

== Legacy ==
Cindy's Rooftop on Michigan Avenue is named after her. Pritzker Park on State Street was also named for her.
