= Adam Pritzker =

American entrepreneur (born 1984)

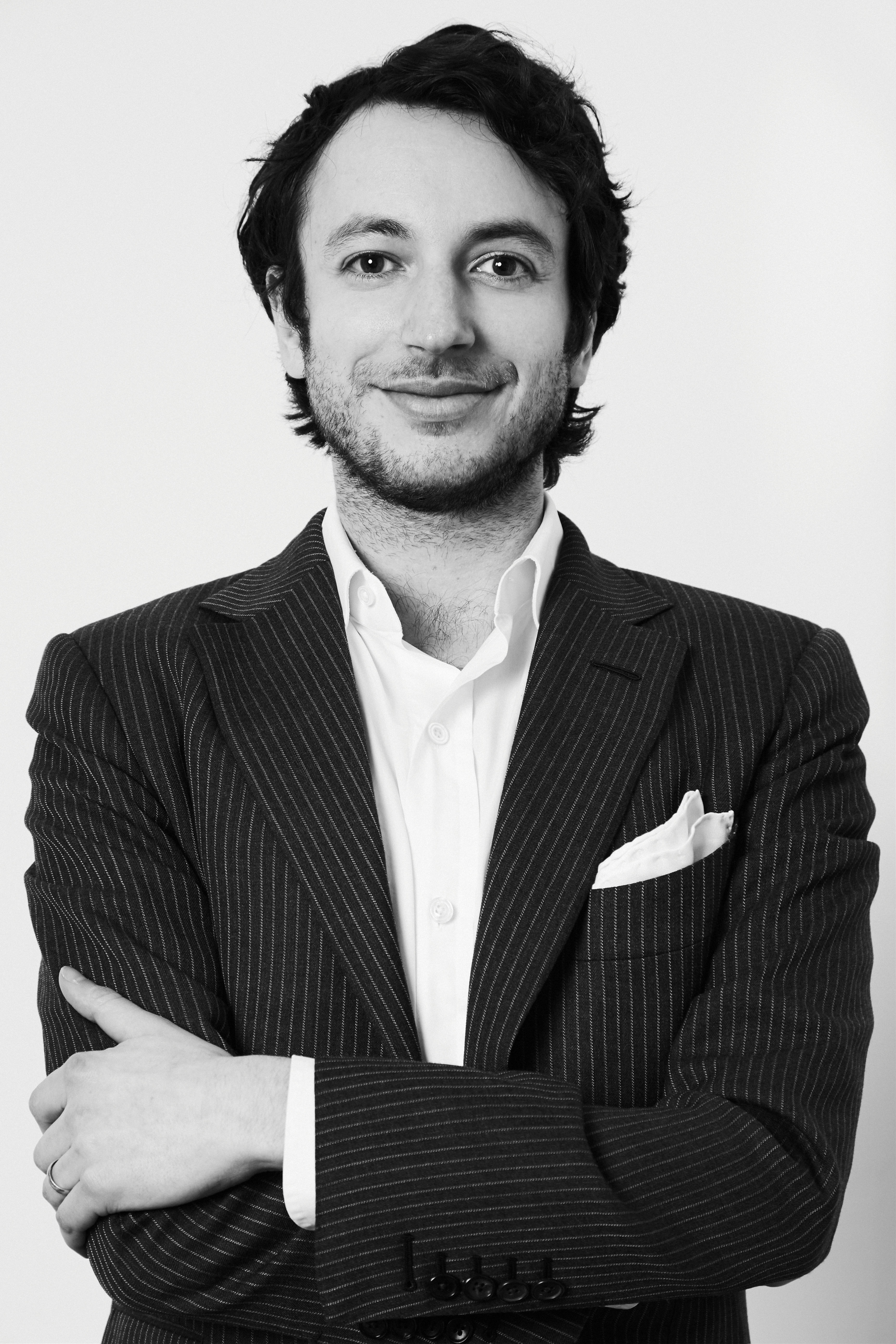
- Born: July 17, 1984 (age 42); San Francisco, California, U.S.
- Education: Columbia University (BA)
- Occupation: Businessman
- Known for: Co-founder, General Assembly and Assembled Brands
- Spouse: Sophie McNally (m. 2016)
- Parents: John Pritzker (father); Lisa Stone (mother)
- Family: Pritzker family

Adam Pritzker (born July 17, 1984) is an American businessman. He is the chairman and CEO of Assembled Brands, a holding company of fashion and lifestyle consumer brands, and was co-founder and chairman of General Assembly, a private school for professional development. In 2018, General Assembly was sold to The Adecco Group for over $400 million.

== Education ==
Pritzker attended San Francisco University High School and Columbia University, graduating in 2008 with a Bachelor of Arts in anthropology. He studied with Jeffrey Sachs at Columbia, and went on to work for him at The Earth Institute.

== Career ==
Pritzker co-founded the General Assembly in January 2011 with Jake Schwartz, Brad Hargreaves, and Matt Brimer. Pritzker and his partners started the company as a New York coworking space that offered practical classes on technology, design and entrepreneurship. The 20,000 square foot space was modeled after a college campus, according to Pritzker. He was the chief creative officer, and helped its expansion to eight other locations globally. He was named to the Inc. (magazine) 30 under 30 list, and the Forbes magazine 30 under 30 list for his work at General Assembly. He left his day-to-day job at the business in 2013 but remained chairman until its sale to The Adecco Group.

In 2013, Pritzker co-founded Assembled Brands. In 2016 he made a co-founding investment in the Khaite luxury fashion brand.

In 2021, he was named a trustee of Columbia University.

== Political action ==
In October 2017, Pritzker partnered with Jeffrey Sachs, a development economist at Columbia University, and Daniel Squadron, a former New York state senator, to found Future Now. The group's mission was to promote "America's Goals 2030", a set of national policy priorities, by funding state-level political candidates committed to working toward those goals. The organization's policy agenda is based on the U.N.'s Sustainable Development Goals – a global list of priorities approved in 2015 by the 193 U.N. members.

In addition to Future Now, Pritzker and Squadron co-founded the States Project, an advocacy nonprofit organization to win Democratic governing majorities in state legislatures.

== Personal life ==
Pritzker married Sophie McNally, the daughter of Keith McNally in 2016. He is a member of the Pritzker family, son of John Pritzker, grandson of Jay Pritzker, and great-grandson of Abram Nicholas Pritzker. His uncle, Thomas Pritzker, is the executive chairman of Hyatt Hotels Corporation, and his aunt, Gigi Pritzker, is a film producer. He and his family live in Beverly Hills and Montecito, California.
