= Superior Bank of Chicago =

The Superior Bank FSB was a Hinsdale, Illinois-based savings and loan association that collapsed in July 2001 with some $2.3b in assets. It was co-owned by the Pritzker family of Chicago.

== Synopsis ==
Superior opened in 1988 under conditions created by the Federal Home Loan Bank Board, which made generous arrangements for the takeover of several failed thrifts. The bank was a 50-50 partnership between the Pritzkers (the elder Jay, Penny and Thomas) and real estate investor Alvin Dworman, who ran Superior from his New York office after Jay Pritzker's death in 1997. The Pritzkers and Dworman bought the failed Lyons Federal for the relatively modest price of $42.5 million, with each using a shell corporation to control half of Coast-to-Coast Financial Corporation (CCFC), a holding company created to own Superior.

In July 2001, Superior was seized by federal banking regulators after the Pritzkers reneged on a recapitalization program. The Pritzker family entered into a $460 million, 15 year, interest-free settlement in December 2001 to protect the family's business reputation and avoid civil forfeiture and litigation. At the time, Superior Bank was the largest bank failure in more than a decade. As of March 2012, former Superior Bank depositors are still owed over $10 million.

=== July 2001 collapse ===
According to a press release from the Office of Thrift Supervision,

Superior Bank suffered as a result of its former high-risk business strategy, which was focused on the generation of significant volumes of subprime mortgage and automobile loans for securitization and sale in the secondary market. OTS found that the bank also suffered from poor lending practices, improper record keeping and accounting, and ineffective board and management supervision.

George Kaufman, a finance professor at Loyola University Chicago called Superior's failure "a tale of gross mismanagement," adding that "[Superior] was engaged in relatively unethical practices, fancy-footwork accounting, playing it very close to the edge."

Kaufman says many share in the blame for the mess-the bank's managers, directors, and auditors, as well as banking regulators-but he also wonders how the Pritzkers, as co-owners, could have allowed it to happen. "One of the great mysteries to me is what the Pritzkers were up to, why they took these chances," he said. "It makes no sense given their wealth and visibility."

=== Settlement by the Pritzkers ===
In December 2001, the Pritzkers agreed to pay a record $460 million to the federal government to avoid being punished for the failure of Superior Bank FSB. It was a 15-year, interest-free settlement that granted the Pritzkers a share of the government's settlement with the bank's former accountants. In June 2012, news reports revealed that the Pritzker family received a discount in 2011 on the 2001 settlement.

According to The Washington Times, "But after paying $316 million of the interest-free debt, the family quietly struck a deal with the Federal Deposit Insurance Corp. (FDIC) in June 2011 to discount the balance in return for paying off the debt early. Ms. Sweet and Mr. Courtney are among 1,400 depositors still owed $10.3 million at the end of March, records show. The FDIC Insurance Fund is still out $296 million after paying off Superior’s insured depositors. It is highly unlikely the remaining depositors or the FDIC will receive much more money since nearly all of the settlement funds have been paid out, according to records and interviews."

“'The depositors got nicked coming, going and after the fact,'” said Clinton Krislov, a lawyer who represents depositors whose accounts exceeded the $100,000 covered by FDIC insurance. “'The depositors have gotten all they will from the Pritzkers.'”

=== RICO lawsuit ===
In 2002 uninsured depositors filed federal class-action charges under the RICO Act against one-time board chairwoman Penny Pritzker, her cousin Thomas Pritzker, Dworman, other bank principals and Ernst & Young. Plaintiffs’ attorney Clint Krislov claimed that those who controlled Superior induced depositors to put money in the bank, “corruptly” funneling money out of the bank to “fraudulently” profit the owners. The lawsuit, Courtney v. Hallerin was initially filed under a district court which dismissed the claims; the appeal was argued before the 7th Circuit of the United States Court of Appeals on September 25, 2006. In her May 7, 2007 opinion, Judge Wood affirmed the lower court's decision.
