= John Pritzker =

American billionaire (born 1953)

John A. Pritzker
- Born: 1953 (age 72–73); Chicago, Illinois, US
- Education: Menlo College (BA); University of Denver
- Occupations: Private equity, philanthropy
- Known for: Founding partner/director
- Spouse(s): Lisa Stone (divorced) Mo KC Pritzker (m. 2021)
- Children: 3, including Adam and Noah
- Parent(s): Jay Pritzker; Marian "Cindy" Friend
- Relatives: Thomas Pritzker (brother); Daniel Pritzker (brother); Jean "Gigi" Pritzker (sister)

John A. Pritzker (born 1953) is an American billionaire and investor. He is a member of the Pritzker family, the grandson of A.N. Pritzker and son of Jay Pritzker.

== Early life and education ==
Pritzker was born in Chicago, Illinois, the son of Marian "Cindy" (née Friend) and Jay Pritzker. Pritzker graduated with a B.A. from Menlo College and attended University of Denver. In 1957, Jay founded Hyatt Hotel and, along with his brothers Robert Pritzker and Donald Pritzker diversified the Chicago-based family business into the Marmon Group building it into a portfolio of over 60 diversified industrial corporations and owned Braniff Airlines from 1983 to 1988. The family has been divesting its assets: in 2006, the family sold Conwood, a smokeless tobacco company, for $3.5 billion to cigarette company Reynolds American Inc; in 2007, the family sold control of the Marmon Group to Warren Buffett's Berkshire Hathaway for $4.5 billion; and in 2010, the family sold its majority stake in Transunion, the Chicago-based credit reporting company, for an undisclosed amount to Chicago-based private-equity firm Madison Dearborn Partners.

== Career ==
In 1972, Pritzker started his career working in the family business, Hyatt Hotels, where in 1984, he rose to become Managing Director and Divisional Vice President. In 1988, he left Hyatt to pursue his own business ventures, including Ticketmaster. In 1996, he formed Mandara Spa, a chain of 72 resort spas. In 2000, 40% of the company was sold to Shiseido Co. In 2001, the remaining 60% was sold to Steiner Leisure Limited, a Nasdaq (STNR) listed company. In 2005, Pritzker founded the private equity firm Geolo Capital with his Mandara business partner Tom Gottlieb; Geolo Capital focused on investments in hospitality, entertainment, and health & wellness companies. In 2009, Geolo Capital bought the iconic Carmel Valley Ranch from Blackstone. The resort was reimagined and opened in 2012. Soon after the resort's opening, Geolo Capital purchased a majority interest in the Joie de Vivre boutique hotel chain. In October 2011, Geolo Capital merged the 30 hotel Joie de Vivre chain with the 12 hotel Thompson Hotel Group to form Commune Hotels & Resorts. In 2012, Commune operated 46 hotels, which generated $450 million in revenues. In January 2016, Commune Hotels merged with Destination Hotels to form Two Roads Hospitality. With that merger, the new company managed over 97 hotels across six brands and annual revenues of over $2.3 billion. In November 2018, Two Roads Hospitality closed on its sale to Hyatt Corporation for a reported price of $480 million.

== Personal life and philanthropy ==
Pritzker has three children. He is the chair of the John Pritzker Family Fund, whose mission is to help people lead fulfilling and healthy lives in vibrant communities, with investments in mental health and healthcare, democracy and civic health, Jewish life, and the arts. The fund was a major supporter of the Department of Psychiatry and Behavioral Sciences at the University of California San Francisco (UCSF), providing a gift of nearly $60 million to fund the construction of the UCSF Nancy Friend Pritzker Building for Psychiatry, which opened in 2022. Pritzker serves on the Executive Council of UCSF Health and the Board of Trustees of the Metropolitan Museum of Art, where he chairs the Development Committee. He is also a board member of the Bernard Osher Foundation, a member of the Emeritus Board of Tipping Point Community, and a past president of the San Francisco Jewish Community Federation. In 2025, Pritzker donated 188 Dada and Surrealist works by 37 artists — collectively known as the Bluff Collection — to the Metropolitan Museum of Art, including works by Man Ray, Max Ernst, Marcel Duchamp, Suzanne Duchamp, Jean Arp, Lee Miller, and Francis Picabia. Pritzker married Mo KC Pritzker in 2021. Together they serve as co-Trustees of the Mojo Philanthropic Fund, which focuses on supporting innovation and imagination.
