= Hotel Revival =

Hotel in Baltimore, Maryland, US

Coordinates: 39.297225°N 76.617238°W

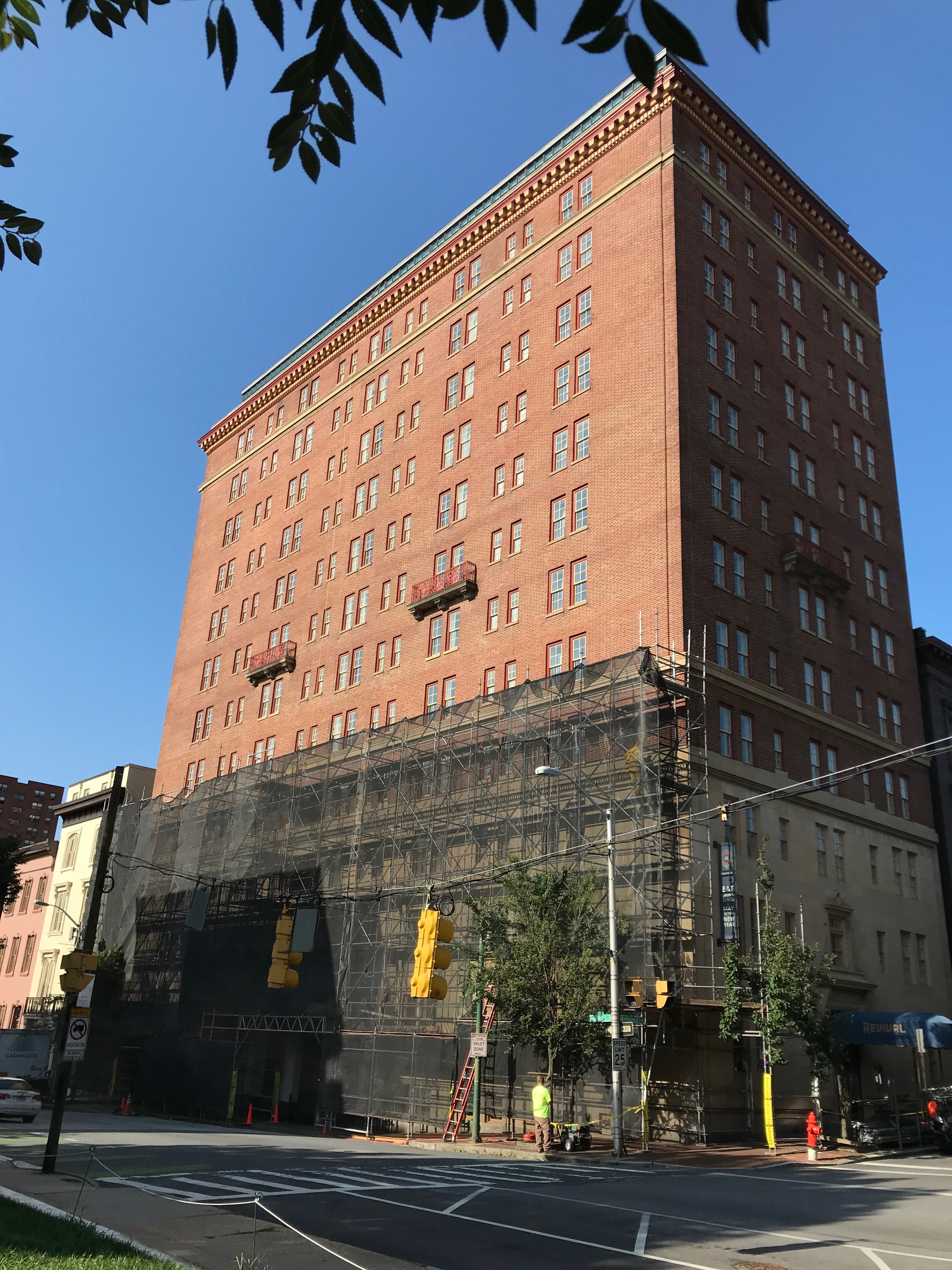
The hotel under renovation, 2018

Hotel Revival is a 107-room boutique hotel in the Mount Vernon neighborhood of Baltimore, Maryland. The hotel opened in 2018 in the former Peabody Court Hotel building, constructed in 1928. It is operated by Joie de Vivre Hospitality. The building is a contributing structure to the Mount Vernon Historic District, a Baltimore City Historic District, and a National Historic Landmark District.

The hotel has amenities including a rooftop restaurant, three private karaoke rooms, and a lounge-like lobby.

The opening of the hotel was part of a 21st century revitalization of the Mount Vernon neighborhood, after a severe city-wide downturn in the 1990s.
