= Penny Pritzker =

American businesswoman and lawyer (born 1959)

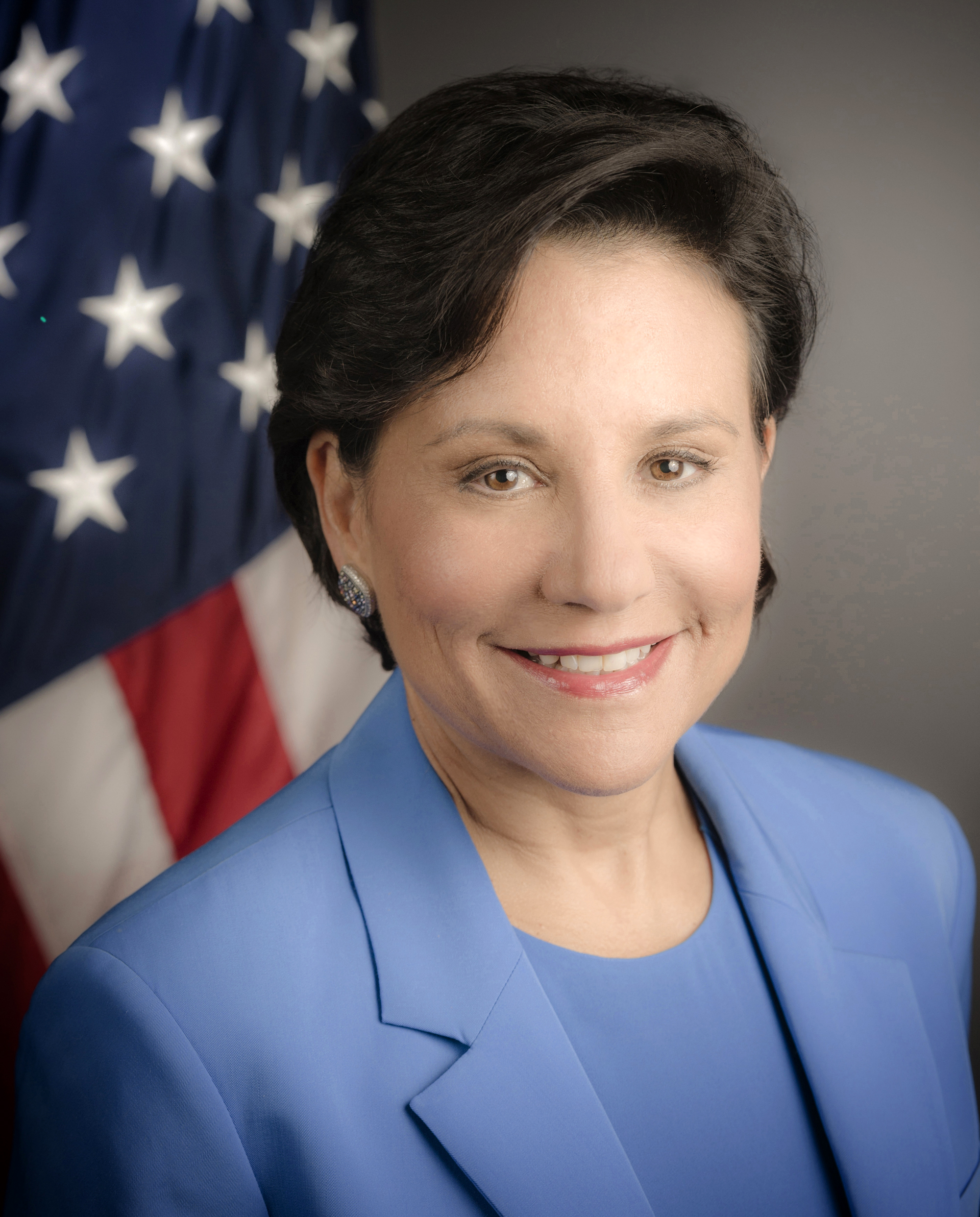
- Official portrait, 2013

United States Special Representative for Ukraine's Economic Recovery
- In office September 14, 2023 – August 6, 2024
- President: Joe Biden
- Preceded by: Position established
- Succeeded by: Position abolished

38th United States Secretary of Commerce
- In office June 26, 2013 – January 20, 2017
- President: Barack Obama
- Deputy: Patrick D. Gallagher (acting); Bruce H. Andrews
- Preceded by: John Bryson
- Succeeded by: Wilbur Ross

Personal details
- Born: Penny Sue Pritzker; May 2, 1959 (age 67) Chicago, Illinois, U.S.
- Party: Democratic
- Spouse: Bryan Traubert
- Children: 2
- Parent(s): Donald Pritzker (father); Sue Sandel (mother)
- Relatives: JB Pritzker (brother); Anthony Pritzker (brother); Pritzker family
- Education: Harvard University (BA); Stanford University (JD, MBA)
- Prtizker's voice Pritzker on Business Sunday/ Recorded September 15, 2014

Penny Sue Pritzker (born May 2, 1959) is an American heiress, businesswoman, and lawyer who served from 2013 to 2017 as the 38th United States secretary of commerce.

Pritzker is a member of the prominent Pritzker family and was involved with the family business from a young age. She was eventually appointed as one of three successors to her uncle, Jay Pritzker. She is the founder of finance and real estate concerns PSP Partners, PSP Capital Partners, and Pritzker Realty Group, and co-founder of Artemis Real Estate Partners and Inspired Capital. She is on the board of Microsoft and was chair of the Carnegie Endowment for International Peace. As of May 2025, Forbes estimated her net worth at $3.9 billion. In 2009, Forbes named Pritzker one of the 100 most powerful women in the world. She is the sister of Illinois governor JB Pritzker.

Pritzker has been involved in several Chicago-based organizations, including the Chicago Board of Education, Museum of Contemporary Art, and her own foundation, the Pritzker Traubert Family Foundation. A friend of the Obama family since their Chicago years, Pritzker was an early supporter of Barack Obama's presidential candidacy.

From 2021 to 2022, Pritzker was a member of the President's Council of Advisors on Science and Technology (PCAST). From September 2023 to August 2024, she was the U.S. Special Representative for Ukraine's Economic Recovery. She has been a fellow of the Harvard Corporation since 2018 and was elected Senior Fellow in 2022, the first woman to serve in this capacity.

== Early life and education ==
Pritzker was born in Chicago in 1959, the daughter of Sue (née Sandel) and Donald Pritzker. She is a member of the Pritzker family of Chicago, a wealthy and influential business family. Donald was one of the co-founders of Hyatt Hotels. He moved the family to Atherton, California, where Hyatt began to grow. Pritzker has two younger brothers, Tony and JB, the incumbent governor of Illinois.

As a child, Pritzker accompanied her father to the Hyatt hotels and checked the women's restrooms for cleanliness. In 1972, her father died suddenly of a heart attack and her mother began battling depression. At times, Penny acted as a caregiver for her mother and brothers. At 16, she wrote her grandfather A. N. Pritzker, the head of the family business empire, a letter asking why he talked business with the men in the family and not with her. Noting her interest in business, her grandfather provided her with a summer course in accounting.

Pritzker attended Castilleja School in Palo Alto, California until 1977. She graduated with a Bachelor of Arts in economics from Harvard College in 1981. She earned both a Juris Doctor and an MBA from Stanford University in 1985.

== Pritzker family businesses ==
=== Early ventures ===
After earning her degrees, Pritzker joined the Pritzker organization encouraged by her cousin Nick Pritzker. In 1987, she founded Classic Residence by Hyatt, later renamed Vi, upscale housing for seniors as an alternative to nursing homes. The project struggled at first, losing $40 million in the first 18 months, but turned around after changes in marketing and management. In 1991, Prtizker's uncle, Jay Pritzker, who led the Pritzker family businesses named Pritzker as the director of the family's' non-hotel landholdings. With that appointment, Pritzker created the Pritzker Realty Group, which developed apartment buildings, shopping centers, and the Baldwin Park neighborhood in Orlando, Florida.

==== Superior Bank ====
From 1991 to 1994, Pritzker was chairperson of the Hinsdale, Illinois-based Superior Bank of Chicago, in which Jay Pritzker had purchased a 50% stake from the Federal Deposit Insurance Corporation, who had taken over the bank when it failed. In 1993, the bank "embarked on a business strategy of significant growth into subprime home mortgages", according to a report by the United States Treasury Department. In 2000, it became clear the bank was faltering. For months near the end of 2000, the Pritzkers tried to work out a recapitalization plan. In July 2001, the FDIC seized the bank after the recapitalization could not be resolved. Subsequently, the Pritzker family reached an agreement with regulators to pay $460 million.

According to the FDIC, by 2011, the uninsured depositors of Superior had each received 81% of their uninsured monies, in addition to the $100,000 each previously received of their insured amount. Industry experts have criticized the Pritzkers in regard to Superior. Consumer advocates and government investigators asserted Superior "engaged in unsound financial activities and predatory lending practices". Responding to The Wall Street Journal, Pritzker noted she had no ownership in the bank, either direct or indirect, and that the bank's reasons for failure "were complex, including changes in accounting practices, auditing failures, reversals in regulatory positions and general economic conditions". She said the bank complied with "fair lending laws" and ethical business practices. A 2001 Business Week article described the bank's other owner, Alvin Dworman, as the more dominant partner in its operation as a result of agreements made by Jay Pritzker. Quoted in The New York Times, a Pritzker family friend observed Pritzker was trapped in a deal of her uncle's making: "Penny got sucked into this… this was really the legacy of Jay."

=== Leadership and dissolution ===
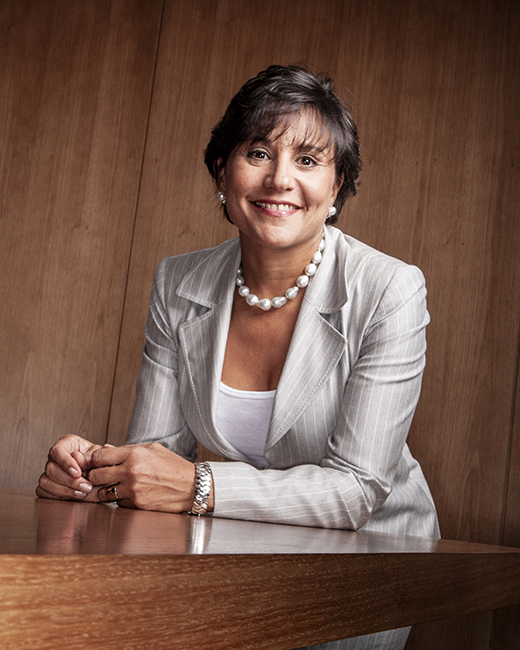
Pritzker in 2008

In 1995, Pritzker was named as one of three successors to the retiring Jay Pritzker besides his son Tom and his cousin Nick. Tom was named the official head of the businesses, Pritzker and Nick were each named vice-chairman. Together, the three were to oversee the family assets. Jay intended to keep the family business together, devising a system of trusts that would allow individual family members to receive money from the trusts to meet their needs; however, the family's wealth was to be primarily maintained in the trusts to grow the businesses and fund philanthropic endeavors. The Pritzker business empire contained over 200 businesses and was valued at $15 billion.

After Jay Pritzker's death in 1999, other family members challenged Tom, Nick, and Penny Pritzker's control of the businesses in multiple lawsuits. Penny's brothers joined in one of the lawsuits. In 2001, they decided to sell family assets to allow eleven cousins to receive a share, dissolving the family's business ties. Disentangling the family's business interests took nearly a decade. The family sold its controlling stake in the Marmon Group to Berkshire Hathaway for $4.5 billion in 2008. The Pritzker Realty Group sold Parking Spot, an airport parking management business Penny co-founded in 1998, to Green Courte Partners LLC for $360 million in 2011.

Beginning in 2005, Penny Pritzker served as non-executive chairman of TransUnion. In 2009, she co-founded Artemis Real Estate Partners LLC, a real estate investment management company, with Deborah Harmon. In 2011, she founded an investment office, PSP Capital Partners. Altogether, Pritzker started five companies before joining the federal government.

== Government and political involvement ==
Pritzker's friendship with Barack Obama and his family dates to the 1990s, when he was a senior lecturer at The University of Chicago law school. Pritzker met Obama at a Chicago YMCA where her son participated in a basketball program coached by Obama's brother-in-law Craig Robinson. Obama and his family were frequent guests at Pritzker's Lake Michigan vacation home. She was an early supporter of Obama's political career, helping finance his 2004 Senate campaign. Early in the Democratic presidential primary, Pritzker's financing helped Obama's candidacy survive when he was trailing Hillary Clinton in the polls. Pritzker remained a major fundraiser for Obama during the 2008 Democratic primary and raised millions overall for his White House bid. She served as the national finance chair of Obama's 2008 presidential campaign. Under her direction, the campaign reached out to small donors. Pritzker also hosted more lavish fundraisers as part of her effort to raise money.

After Obama won the 2008 presidential election, CNN reported that Pritzker was his top choice for Commerce Secretary, but she withdrew her name from consideration. According to the Chicago Tribune, she did so because of her "obligations to her family, for whom she was still overseeing billions in assets, and the financial crisis, which was putting some of those assets at risk". As a result of her public support for Obama, Pritzker found herself the target of labor groups for Hyatt Hotels' practices. When UNITE HERE demonstrated against Pritzker, its president cited her connection to Obama as a reason the group expected her to use better labor practices.

Pritzker was a member of the President's Council on Jobs and Competitiveness and served on the President's Economic Recovery Advisory Board. Although she was less active in Obama's 2012 campaign than she had been in 2008, she served as national co-chair of Obama for America 2012. She was also on the board of directors of the Council on Foreign Relations, a nonpartisan think tank focused on world affairs and U.S. foreign policy. President Joe Biden appointed her as U.S. special representative for Ukraine's economic recovery in 2023.

== Secretary of Commerce (2013–2017) ==
=== Nomination and confirmation ===
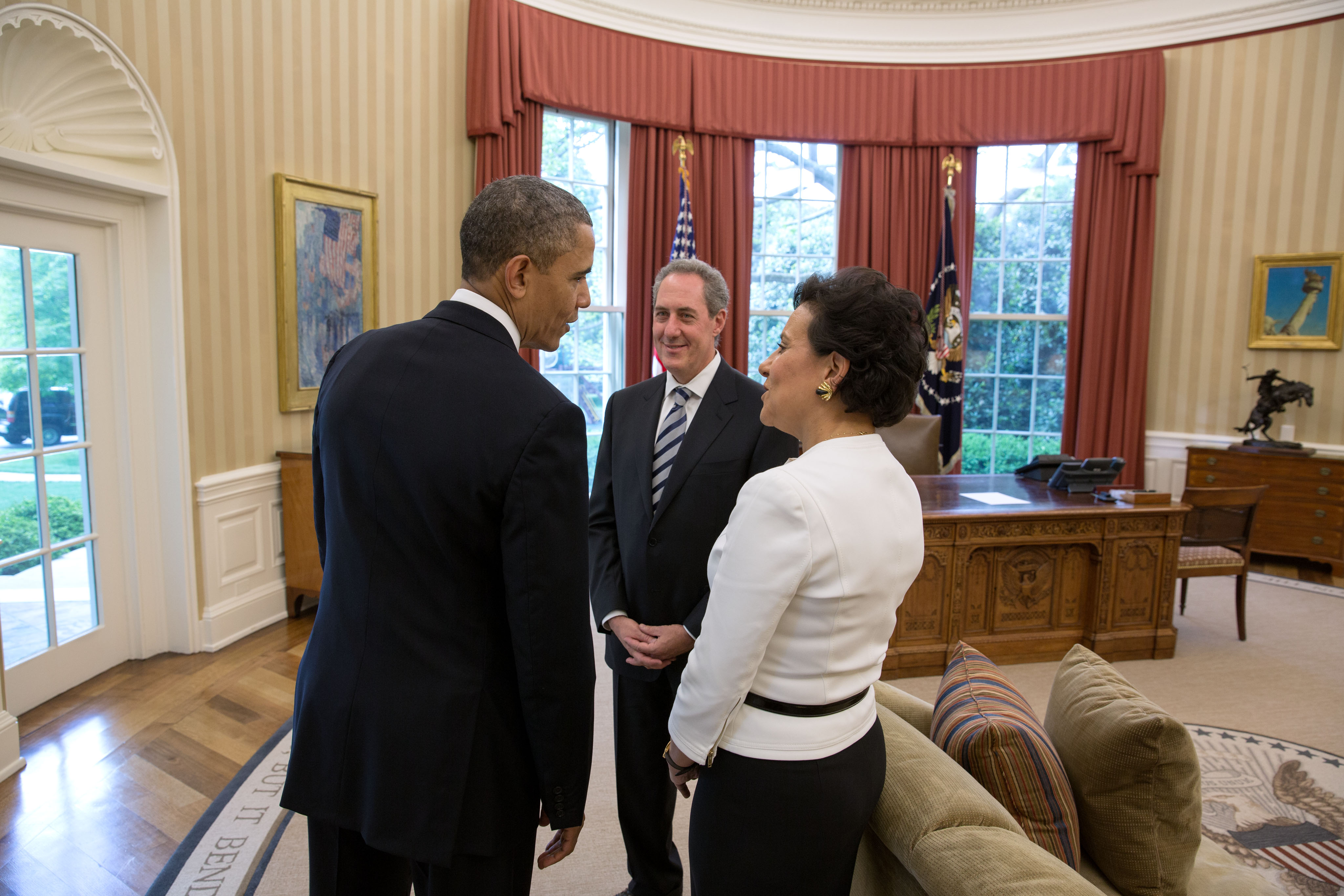
Pritzker with President Barack Obama and Mike Froman in the Oval Office, May 2, 2013

On May 2, 2013, President Obama nominated Pritzker for United States Secretary of Commerce. To avoid conflicts of interest, Pritzker agreed to sell her interest in at least 221 companies and resign from 158 entities, including the Hyatt board of directors and the Chicago Board of Education. (Note: In November 2017, the International Consortium of Investigative Journalism released the "Paradise Papers," documents related to offshore services and tax havens, and alleged that Pritzker transferred her shares of two of her holdings to her children rather than selling them, as she had indicated on ethics forms. Pritzker responded with a statement saying that she had complied with the rules and regulations of the Office of Government Ethics regarding her holdings and divestitures.) On May 23, the Senate held its confirmation hearing, which covered various topics. Although Pritzker's family business dealings had been a target of Republican criticism when Obama announced her nomination, only three questions at the hearing related to her family. The Senate confirmed Pritzker on June 25 by a vote of 97 to 1. (Note: Senator Bernie Sanders, an Independent caucusing with the Democrats, was the lone vote against Pritzker's confirmation, whereas Democratic Senator Sheldon Whitehouse and Republican Senator Mike Lee were the two Senators to abstain the vote.) She was sworn in on June 26.

=== Tenure ===
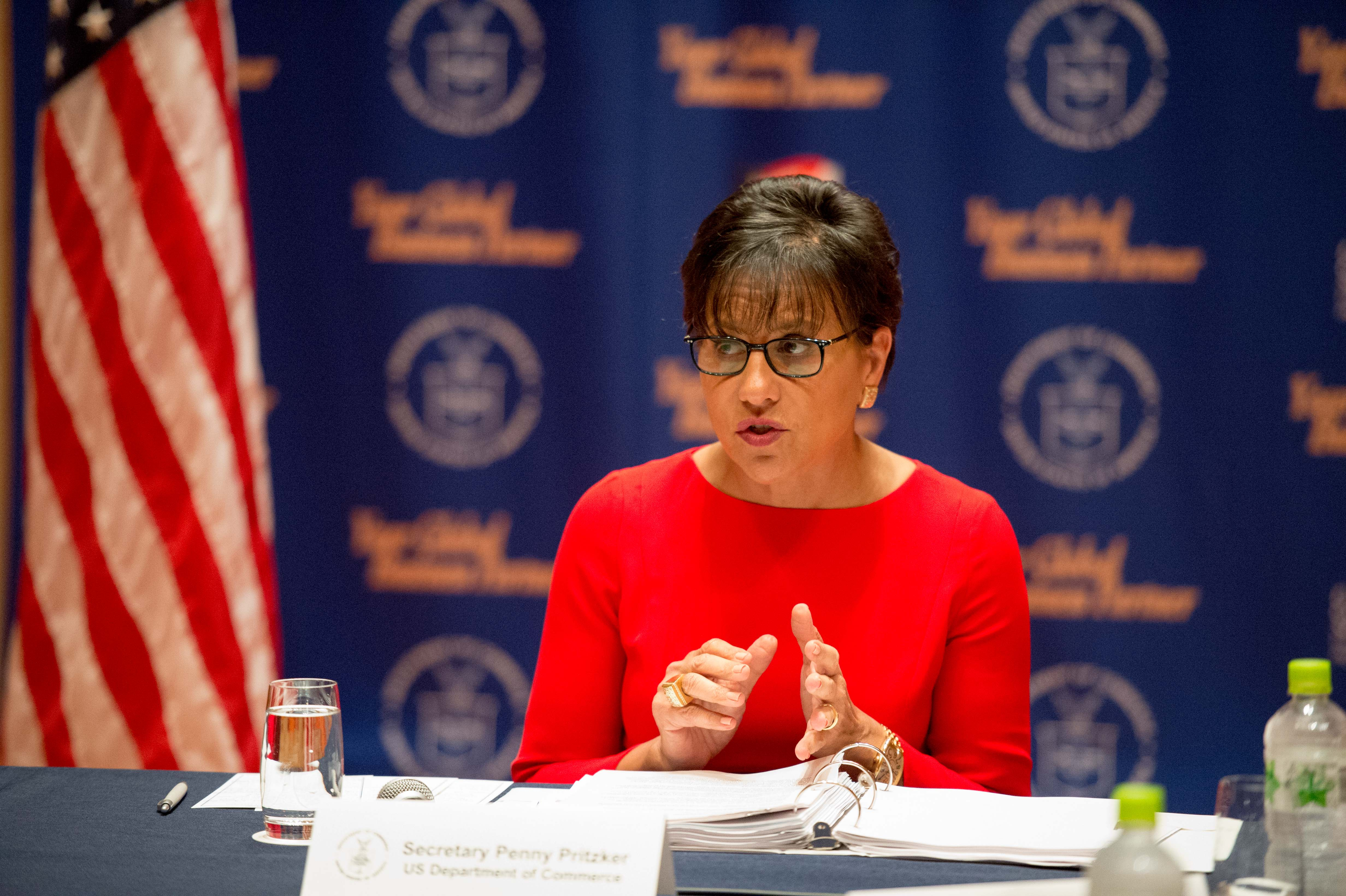
Secretary Pritzker addresses international media in Tokyo on October 21, 2014.

Among Pritzker's priorities was the Trans-Pacific Partnership (TPP), a proposed trade agreement that would have been the "largest regional trade agreement in history". Pritzker supported the TPP as a way to provide market access to U.S. businesses and for the U.S. to set the standards for trade. Leading up the 2016 presidential election, in which both major-party candidates opposed the TPP, Pritzker and other Obama officials continued to push for its passage. Congress did not pass the bill.

Pritzker named a Digital Economy Board of Advisors, which included tech industry CEOs and academics, to advise on policy. She expanded the IP attache program, which helps the tech industry protect their intellectual property abroad. Pritzker also created the Commerce Data Advisory Council to identify priorities for the Department of Commerce, a prolific publisher of data intended to allow businesses to plan and innovate. She served as the lead negotiator for the United States in the E.U.–U.S. Privacy Shield, an agreement governing how companies transfer digital data from Europe to the U.S.

After Obama's announcement that the United States would move toward normalizing relations with Cuba, Pritzker traveled to Cuba. Although Obama's change in policy did not end the U.S. trade embargo, since ending the embargo required an act of Congress, Pritzker met with Cuban trade ministers and other officials to discuss the two countries' changing relationship and lay the groundwork for more economic involvement.

After her tenure as secretary, Pritzker returned to PSP and the private sector.

== U.S. Special Representative for Ukraine's Economic Recovery ==
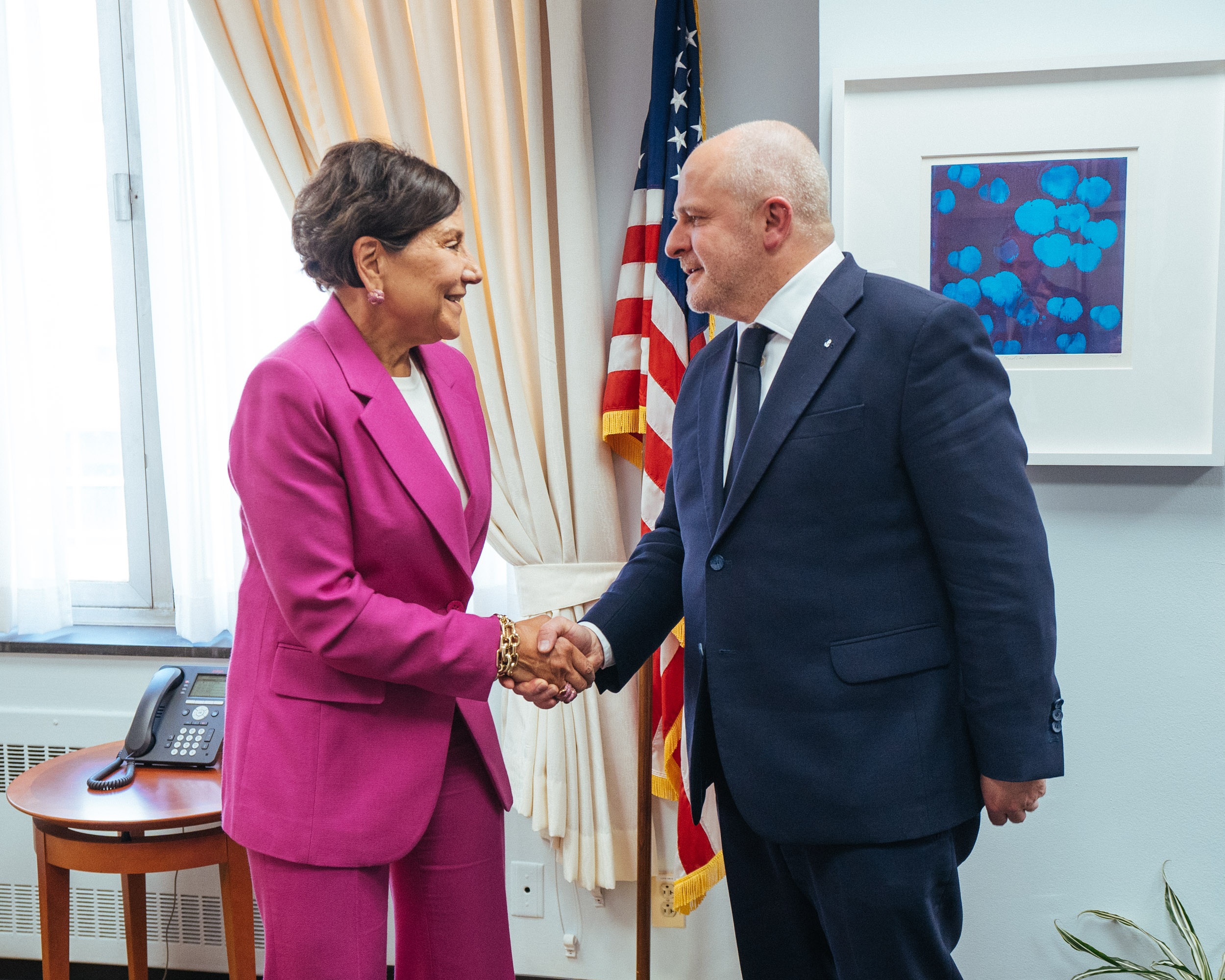
Penny Pritzker meeting her Polish counterpart – Paweł Kowal

On September 14, 2023, President Biden appointed Pritzker as the U.S. Special Representative for Ukraine's Economic Recovery. In this role, she worked with the Ukrainian government, the G7, the EU, international financial institutions, international partners and the US private sector.

During her first visit to Kyiv in her new role, Pritzker met with President Volodymyr Zelenskyy, the prime minister and government officials, and the Speaker of the Verkhovna Rada.

Pritzker resigned on August 6, 2024.

== Civic and philanthropic activities ==
Pritzker was a member of the Chicago Board of Education and chaired the Chicago Public Education Fund. She was advisory board chair of Skills for America's Future (SAF), a policy initiative of the Aspen Institute. She also chaired the Museum of Contemporary Art, Chicago. In 2002, Pritzker was elected to a six-year term on the 30-person Harvard Board of Overseers. In 2018, she was elected to the Harvard Corporation, the 12-person group that governs Harvard University. Pritzker donated $100 million to Harvard in 2021 for the construction of a new economics department building. She became the first woman to serve in the Corporation's top role, senior fellow, in 2022. After Harvard president Claudine Gay's resignation, Pritzker faced criticism and calls to resign as senior fellow from some prominent Harvard alumni and donors for the Corporation's handling of the events.

Pritzker and her husband, Bryan Traubert, have their own foundation, the Pritzker Traubert Family Foundation. It focuses on physical activity for young people and increasing economic opportunity in Chicago. Among its initiatives were a $5 million donation to converting grass soccer fields to easier-to-maintain turf and a $1 million donation to repair tennis courts around Chicago. The Pritzkers also established ChicagoRun, a program that prepares Chicago-area children to run their first 5k race.

In 2012, Chicago magazine named Pritzker one of the 100 most powerful Chicagoans. On March 26, 2014, Elle honored Pritzker and others at the U.S. Italian Embassy during its annual "Women in Washington Power List". In 2018, Pritzker was elected to succeed Harvey V. Fineberg as chairperson of the Carnegie Endowment for International Peace.

In March 2020, Pritzker set up the Illinois COVID-19 Response Fund to assist nonprofit organizations during the COVID-19 pandemic after receiving a call from her brother Governor JB Pritzker. The siblings announced the creation of the fund with $23 million in startup money on March 24, 2020, six days after the governor's request. Pritzker and her husband contributed $1.5 million of that sum.

== Sports venture ==
Pritzker was part of the investment group led by Neeru Khosla and her family that purchased the Seattle Seahawks of the National Football League (NFL). When the sale was finalized on September 3, 2026, Pritzker became a minority owner of the team.

== Personal life ==
Pritzker is married to ophthalmologist Bryan Traubert, with whom she has two children. Although her relationship with her brothers became strained after the family business restructuring, they reconciled, and Penny expressed support for the idea of JB running for office in 2017.

In the 1980s, after training for six months, Pritzker completed her first Ironman Triathlon in Hawaii in 12 hours. She has since completed multiple triathlons and marathons.

== See also ==
- Federal Deposit Insurance Corporation
- List of female United States Cabinet members
- List of Jewish United States Cabinet members
- List of people and organisations named in the Paradise Papers
- Office of Thrift Supervision

== Notes ==
Political offices
Preceded by John Bryson	United States Secretary of Commerce; 2013–2017	Succeeded by Wilbur Ross
U.S. order of precedence (ceremonial)
Preceded by Ernest Moniz as Former U.S. Cabinet Member	Order of precedence of the United States as Former U.S. Cabinet Member	Succeeded by Anthony Foxx as Former U.S. Cabinet Member
