= Give Them 20 =

American social media campaign

Give Them 20 is a social media campaign encouraging Americans to thank veterans for their service and was launched in May 2015 by American Corporate Partners, a 501(c)(3) non-profit organization that works with United States veterans in their transition from the military to the civilian world.

The campaign encourages Americans to “Thank them, Salute Them, Give Them 20” by posting videos on social media of themselves dedicating 20 push-ups, sit-ups, jumping jacks etc. to veterans using #givethem20. Participants also nominate their friends to join in and Give Them 20. Videos contributed to the campaign are featured on a website, GiveThem20.org.

== Celebrity involvement ==
Jon Stewart participated in Give Them 20 on May 26, 2015 and nominated John Oliver and the New York Mets to also Give Them 20. The Mets completed the challenge on May 30. Since the launch of the campaign, John Oliver, Jimmy Kimmel, the Rockettes, the Washington Nationals, Stephen Colbert, Daymond John, Secretary of Commerce Penny Pritzker and more have completed the challenge.
