= Aruba Marriott Resort & Stellaris Casino =

Resort and casino in Aruba

Coordinates: 12.580821°N 70.042987°W

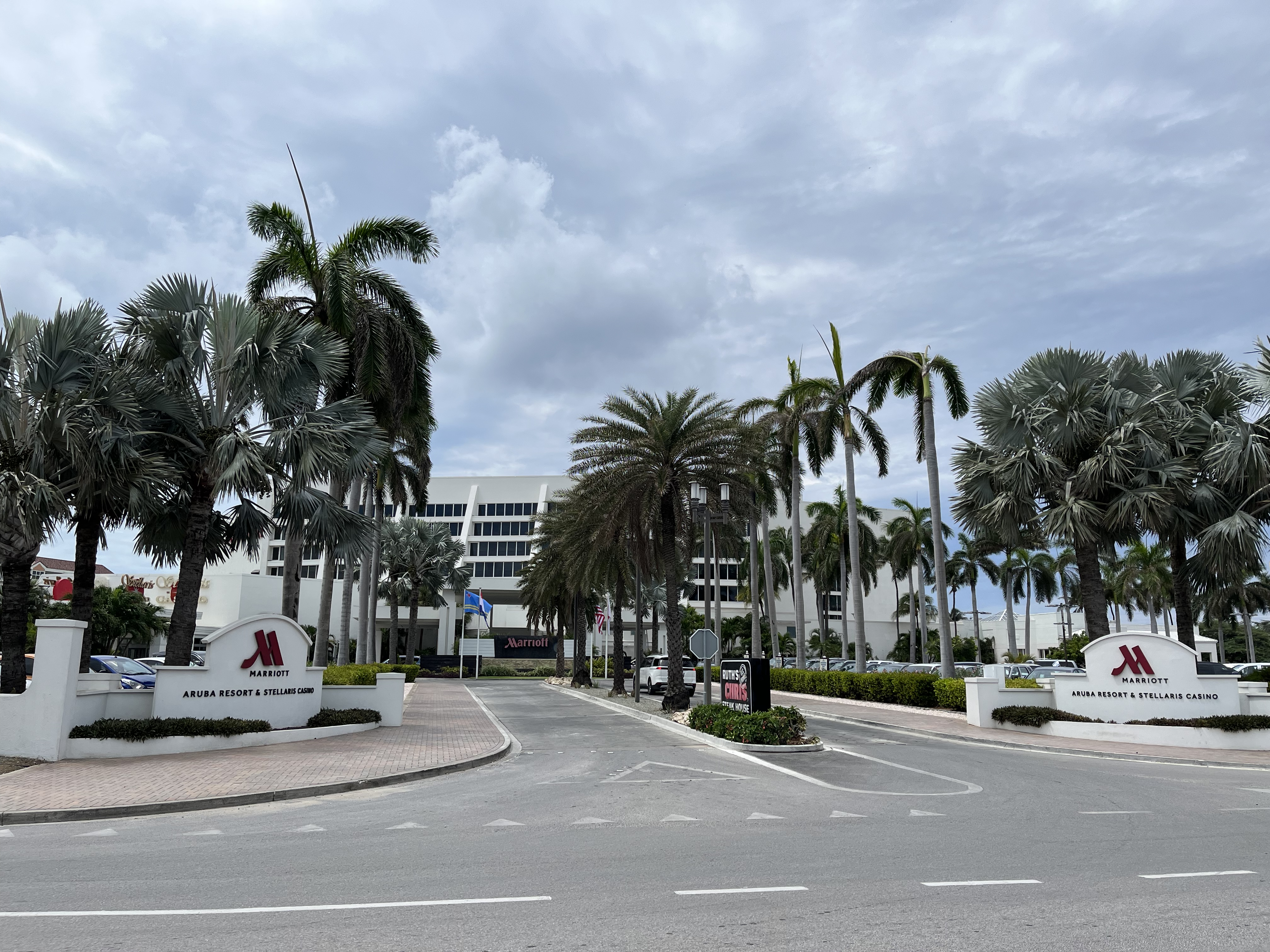
- Aruba Marriott Resort
- Interactive map of the Aruba Marriott Resort & Stellaris Casino area

General information
- Location: L.G. Smith Blvd 101, Noord, Aruba
- Opened: 1995

The Aruba Marriott Resort & Stellaris Casino is a hotel and casino complex located along Palm Beach on the northwestern coast of Aruba. The Atrium-style Resort is situated on 10 oceanfront acres with 600 feet of beach frontage.

The property opened in 1995, and is part of the Marriott Hotels & Resorts portfolio.

The resort stands next to two additional Marriott properties, Marriott's Aruba Ocean Club and Marriott's Aruba Surf Club, both part of the Marriott Vacation Club brand.

== Facilities ==
The resort includes a pool with a swim‑up bar and multiple on‑site amenities such as the Mandara Spa and a selection of dining venues. The Mandara Spa, measuring 6,500 square feet, is the largest spa on the island. The Stellaris Casino, located within the complex, operates 24 hours a day and is the largest casino in Aruba, with 28 gaming tables and 522 slot machines. The Tradewinds Club is an adults‑only level within the Aruba Marriott Resort & Stellaris Casino. Guestrooms and suites have a coastal‑inspired aesthetic using neutral tones accented by coral and sea‑glass colors. Rooms have views of the Palm Beach and the Caribbean Sea. A renovation of all 414 guestrooms and suites was completed in December 2025.

== Dining ==
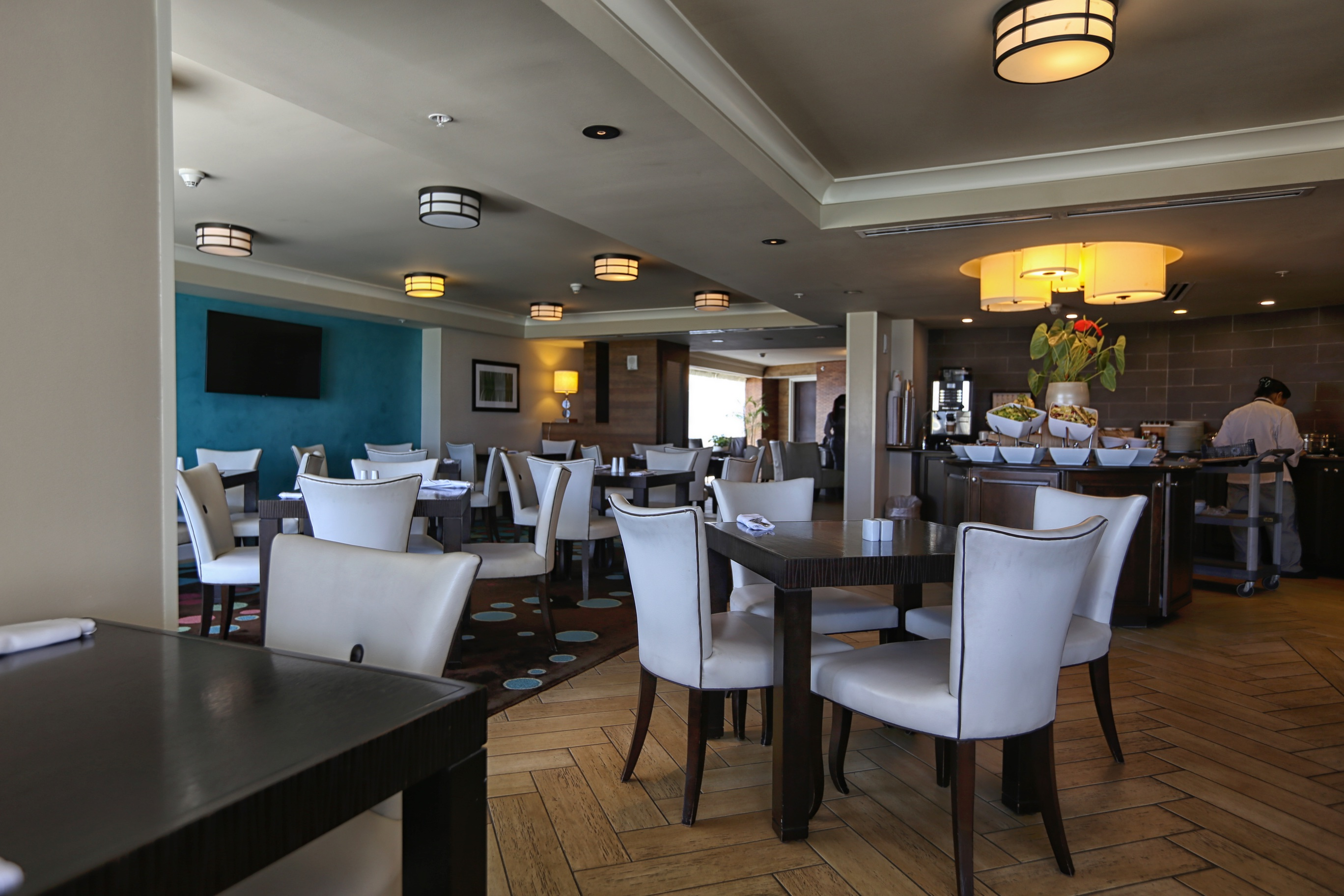
Lounge

The resort has several dining venues, including franchised steakhouse Ruth’s Chris Steak House, beachfront seafood restaurant Atardi, Mediterranean‑inspired Mercát, The Lobby, Starbucks, Gelato & Co., and poolside bar Waves Bar and Grill.
