= Task Force for Business and Stability Operations =

The Task Force for Business and Stability Operations (TFBSO) is a division of the U.S. Department of Defense established in 2006 to stabilize the post-invasion Iraqi economy, reduce unemployment, and attract foreign investors to Iraq. In 2009, TFBSO expanded operations to include Afghanistan. TFBSO founder and former Deputy Undersecretary of Defense Paul Brinkley described TFBSO stating: "We do capitalism. We're about helping companies make money."

As US troops withdrew from Iraq, TFBSO ended its operations in that country.

TFBSO founder Paul Brinkley joined Department of Defense in 2004 as co-director of the Business Transformation Agency. Before joining the Defense Department, he was chief information officer and senior vice president at JDS Uniphase and served on the economic development advisory council to the Fujian Provincial Government in the People's Republic of China. Brinkley left TFBSO in June 2011 and soon after became chief executive officer of North America Western Asia Holdings, which he co-founded.

== Iraq ==
Although the initial authorization of TFBSO only pertained to innovations in the military's contracting methodology, by 2009, TFBSO operations in Iraq included foreign private direct investment; restarting state-owned enterprises, banking and financial networks; restoration of industrial capacity; corporate development; procurement assistance; private sector development; agricultural revitalization; and communications networks.

=== Recruiting CEOs ===
TFBSO invited several major international corporations to Iraq to understand potential investment opportunities in the country. Prominent invitees included:

- Hyatt
- Boeing
- General Electric
- Case New Holland
- Microsoft
- Google/YouTube
- Honeywell
- Daimler Benz
- Mitsubishi
- Samsung
- John Deere
- ABC Home Furnishings of New York
- Harrods of London.

This recruitment effort involved bringing American business executives to personally tour Iraq. In 2010, Brinkley told the World Affairs Council of Northern California that:

[Recruitment] was the easiest part of my job. I have yet to find that I can't take an American businessman, ideally in his mid-forties, going through a raging midlife crisis, take this guy to a war zone, show him around with our troops, and then put him in front of a general. All the general needs to say is, 'I need you to help.' The hit rate – my success rate – on that model is extremely high.

=== Restarting State-Owned Enterprises ===
By 2009, TFBSO had received about $103 million to rehabilitate state-owned enterprises. TFBSO estimated that its efforts impacted 24,500 jobs. The Special Inspector General for Iraq Reconstruction called these estimates "overstated", and found that the majority of TFBSO projects took twice as long to implement than was expected.

== Afghanistan ==
TFBSO began operations in Afghanistan in the summer of 2009. As in Iraq, TFBSO in Afghanistan concentrated on attracting private foreign direct investment, corporate development, procurement, and reform of the banking sector.

=== Mineral resources ===
In May 2011, TFBSO and the U.S. Geological Survey announced that they had identified dozens of reserves of copper, gold, lithium, and rare earth minerals in Afghanistan. The report trumpeted the potential value of the mineral assets, estimating that exploiting the lithium deposits alone "could result in up to $1.2 billion in additional annual revenue for the government of Afghanistan". Reportedly in response to outreach from former CIA operative and TFBSO consultant Milton Bearden, The New York Times reported in a front-page article that the find was "far beyond any previously known reserves and enough to fundamentally alter the Afghan economy and perhaps the Afghan war itself".

Raw Story reported that these findings were not new, and that "a detailed US Geological Survey report on Afghanistan's mineral resources was published as recently as 2007". New York Times reporter James Risen later told Yahoo News that "Milt convinced Brinkley to talk to me, and Brinkley convinced other Pentagon officials to go on the record. I think Milt realized that things were going so badly in Afghanistan that people would be willing to talk about this."

=== Criticisms over awarding contracts to Chinese firms ===
Former US ambassador to Iraq and Afghanistan Zalmay Khalilzad criticized TFBSO for setting up a bidding process on an Afghan oil contract that favored a state-owned Chinese firm against private Western companies.” He called TFBSO's bid selection process "bad for U.S. business, and bad for the rebuilding effort in that embattled country".

=== Lack of Coordination ===
A report by the Special Inspector General for Afghanistan Reconstruction (SIGAR) noted that "TFBSO's perception that it did not have to coordinate with other U.S. agencies resulted in TFBSO electing not to share information with USAID in multiple instances."

== Reorganization and Brinkley's Departure ==
Several US State Department officials criticized TFBSO's efforts to revive state-owned enterprises for being in contradiction with free-market principles. The Washington Post described tensions between State and TFBSO as a "bureaucratic knife fight over the best way to revive Iraq's moribund economy" and that "under pressure from Congress to demonstrate progress on the ground, the military often favors immediate solutions aimed at quelling violence. That has prompted objections from some at State who question the long-term consequences of that expeditious approach."

Amidst these concerns, Congresswoman Betty McCollum (D-MN) fought to have TFBSO defunded, arguing that "helping companies make money is not the role of the Department of Defense":

The Pentagon's focus should not be on starting up businesses or facilitating business development tours for corporate CEOs […] Every House member needs to ask why the Department of Defense is helping Kate Spade, an exclusive New York based hand-bag designer, to source raw materials in Afghanistan? Since when did the Pentagon invest tax payer dollars in promoting women's fashion?

=== Allegations of Ethics Violations and Other Criticisms ===
During the course of Brinkley's tenure, he and members of his leadership team that had remained in place following the end of President Bush's second Administration came under ethics scrutiny within the Pentagon's Office of the Inspector General and Office of the Secretary of Defense, by the Federal Bureau of Investigation, and by others across the Obama Administration and within the U.S. Congress. Published and unpublished allegations ranged from unethical business deals, financial irregularities and inappropriate management practices to violations of administrative and other applicable law. As a result of these and other concerns, a range of concerned staff departed the TFBSO. Brinkley was encouraged to leave his post quietly at the end of then-Defense Secretary Gates's tenure.

In the National Defense Authorization Act for Fiscal Year 2011, Congress mandated against Brinkley's wishes that TFBSO's operations in Iraq be folded into USAID. In a move that reportedly "alarmed senior U.S. military officials", Brinkley and several staff announced their plans to leave TFBSO in March 2011.

As of 2013, the Pentagon announced its intention to end further activity by the TFBSO. In December 2014, the Special Inspector General for Afghanistan Reconstruction released letters detailing fresh allegations related to TFBSO practices involving imprudent spending, profligate travel by employees and contractors, and possible mismanagement under former TFBSO Director Paul Brinkley. Between the beginning of its operations in Afghanistan in 2010 and March 2013, TFBSO spent nearly $700 million. One letter raised safety concerns relating to a natural gas pipeline in northern Afghanistan, Sheberghan-Mazar, that has suffered years of corrosion and that TFBSO helped to repair. The letters noted that USAID and Embassy officials had expressed reservations about TFBSO and Afghan Gas Enterprise (AGE)'s Sheberghan-Mazar pipeline project. The officials expressed concern that AGE would not be able to complete the pipeline's rehabilitation before TFBSO ceased operations in Afghanistan on November 21, 2014.

=== Brinkley joins NAWAH ===
Four months after leaving TFBSO, Brinkley became CEO of North America Western Asia Holdings (NAWAH), an investment and advisory services firm he co-founded to seek to grow business in Iraq not long after he directly lobbied Congress to end TFBSO's mandate in Iraq. The firm, founded by Brinkley and Hyatt Hotels executive chairman Thomas Pritzker, reportedly will initially seek to invest in Iraqi companies while advising clients looking to do business in the country and throughout North Africa and Central Asia. Pritzker said that "it's potentially an elegant handoff between the government and business".

OpenSecrets subsequently added Brinkley to their Revolving Door database, a tracker of the pipeline between government and private industry.
