= The H Dubai =

Hotel in Dubai

The H Dubai is a 5-star hotel located in Dubai, United Arab Emirates, on the perimeter of the Dubai International Financial Centre (DIFC) and the Dubai World Trade Centre at Number One Sheikh Zayed Road.

== The building ==
The building is composed of two towers and has the shape of the letter H. One tower is a 34-floor hotel and the other is a 40-floor office tower, linked on the 29th floor by a Sky Suite.

The hotel is 142,6 m (467,8 ft.) high and has 236 rooms, suites, and apartments. The Royal Penthouse Suite is spread across 1,130 sqm over two floors with a 360-degree view of Dubai, a majlis and a rooftop private pool.

In addition, The H Dubai has 11 dining outlets, an events center, a Mandara Spa and an outdoor pool.

== The history ==
The construction of the building started in 2004 and lasted 3 years. The project architect, Enzo Messina, wanted to create a transition between Bur Dubai and World Trade Centre, the office tower being the delimitation of these two districts.

The building is a blend of contemporary and Arabic style. During the construction, materials used were concrete, glazed-glass, aluminum, and marble with fossilized remains of species from 180 million years ago.

The lobby was designed as an atrium encircled by a series of glass balconies where guests on the first and second floors could see the lobby. In the center, the lounge was surrounded by some palm trees and a shallow water rill.

== Opening & rebranding ==
The hotel was opened to the public in 2007 and was named after the hotel brand Monarch, a five-star luxury hotel brand. It was part-owned and fully operated by Kuwait’s Refad Hotels and Resorts through a joint venture with a Dubai Government entity. The Monarch used to host royalty and international celebrities such as Richard Branson or Kofi Annan among others.

The management contract with Refad Hotels and Resorts ended and a private institutional investment house based in Abu Dhabi took full ownership of the hotel. In 2012, along with the change of ownership, The Monarch was rebranded as The H Hotel. Since 2019, the hotel is managed by STORY Hospitality, a UAE based hospitality management company.
