= Fest300 =

- Founders: Chip Conley, Art Gimbel
- Headquarters: San Francisco, California, USA

Fest300 is a San Francisco-based company that produces an online festival magazine and annual list of the 300 best festivals in the world, curated by Chip Conley (Airbnb, Joie de Vivre Hotels) and team. Fest300 members pledge to attend at least one festival per year.

In addition to editorial content, the site hosts video and photo galleries from festivals around the world.

== History ==
Fest300 was founded by Conley and Art Gimbel in early 2013.

In November 2014, Fest300 updated its selection process, with the internal team curating 270 of the 300 festivals while the other 30 are crowdsourced from the festival community.

In September 2016, Fest300 was acquired by Everfest. The combined entity continues to produce the Fest300 list.
