= Paul Brinkley =

American businessman and government official

Paul A. Brinkley
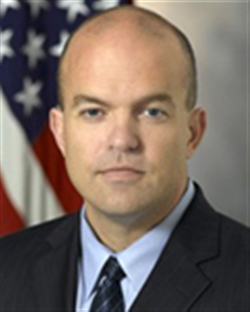
- Born: November 15, 1966 (age 59); Dallas, Texas, U.S.
- Education: Texas A&M (B.S., M.S.)
- Occupation: CEO
- Employer: North America Western Asia Holdings
- Known for: Deputy Under Secretary of Defense, Director Task Force for Business and Stability Operations; Chief Executive Officer & Co-Founder, NAWAH

Paul Andrew Brinkley (born November 15, 1966, in Dallas, Texas) is an American businessman and government official. Brinkley is the co-founder and current CEO of North America Western Asia Holdings, an investment and business development firm based in Washington, D.C. Brinkley served as the United States Deputy Undersecretary of Defense under Secretaries of Defense Donald Rumsfeld and Robert Gates from 2004 to 2011.

== Education ==
Brinkley attended Texas A&M University, graduating with Bachelor's and Master's degrees in industrial engineering. He later completed part-time doctoral work in operations research at North Carolina State University, before choosing to focus on his professional career. Brinkley has published research on mathematical modeling, industrial statistics, and artificial intelligence.

== Personal life ==
Brinkley has two children. His daughter, Lindsey Brinkley, is a medical student.

== Early business career ==
Brinkley began his career as an engineer with Northern Telecom Ltd., later Nortel Networks. Brinkley and his colleagues received four US patents for his work at Nortel. Brinkley later joined JDS Uniphase Corporation, where he held multiple roles, including Senior Vice President for Supply Chain Management, Senior Vice President for Customer Service and Inside Sales and Chief Information Officer. While at JDS Uniphase, Brinkley served as a member of the international economic development advisory board to the Government of Fujian Province in the People's Republic of China.

== Department of Defense ==
Brinkley accepted an appointment as Deputy Undersecretary of Defense in 2004.

=== Business Transformation Agency ===
In partnership with Deputy Undersecretary of Defense for Financial Management Thomas Modly, Brinkley consolidated Department-wide business systems used by the Department of the Army, Department of the Navy and Department of the Air Force into the Business Transformation Agency. The work of the Business Transformation Agency was lauded by the Government Accountability Office for streamlining departmental business systems.

=== Task Force for Business and Stability Operations ===
In 2006, under the direction of Deputy Secretary of Defense Gordon England, Brinkley established the Task Force for Business and Stability Operations, charged with restoring normal economic activity in Iraq during widespread conflict in the Iraq War, and to streamline and transform the Department's contracting process and systems in Iraq. While interdepartmental disagreements took place given the nature of the TFBSO's directives, the task force focused on making business development a component of a broader military counter-insurgency. At its peak in Iraq, TFBSO had over 350 professionals deployed in every province of the country, including large numbers of civilian business leaders and agriculture experts from the American private sector and academia. Over 200 international companies visited Iraq as part of the foreign direct investment initiative sponsored by TFBSO, with 80 initiating business activity as a result of their engagement. The Task Force directly facilitated over $8 billion in foreign direct investment.

In 2009, the TFBSO began work supporting the United States mission in Afghanistan, placing heavy focus on rapid development of mining resources with a goal of imposing environmental and socially responsible processes for the Afghan government to finance its own security and development. TFBSO also launched aggressive efforts to encourage foreign investment in other sectors, including agriculture and information technology.

In addition to its work in Afghanistan and Iraq, TFBSO projects supported the US Embassy in Islamabad and the United States Africa Command in Rwanda and Sudan.

=== Recognition ===
Brinkley received the Defense Distinguished Public Service Medal, the highest civilian award conferred by the Department of Defense, for his service in establishing and leading the TFBSO. He also received the Joint Distinguished Civilian Service Award, the highest civilian award conferred by the Joint Chiefs of Staff, for his contributions to the stabilization of Iraq. In 2006, he received the Eagle Award, an annual award for the outstanding civilian information technology leader in the federal government, for his work leading defense business modernization. In 2010, Brinkley and four members of his team were meeting with a hotel manager when a powerful car bomb detonated 30 meters from their conference room in downtown Baghdad. The blast destroyed the building's exterior façade and shattered windows, causing numerous casualties. Despite sustaining significant concussive and shrapnel injuries requiring medical care, all five individuals returned to work virtually without interruption under hazardous security conditions. Brinkley and the four task force members received the Defense of Freedom Medal, the civilian equivalent of the Purple Heart, in response to this incident.

=== Resignation ===
In May 2010, after four years of work in Iraq and Afghanistan, the work of the Task Force was ruled to be outside of the normal role of the Department of Defense under Title X of the United States Code. Months of Congressional engagement ensued, with Senate Armed Services Committee Chairman Carl Levin and Minority Leader John McCain urging Secretary of Defense Robert Gates in writing to retain the TFBSO. Despite their intervention, Congress passed legislation in December 2010 to move the work of TFBSO into the United States Agency for International Development no later than October 2011 and immediately cease its operations in Iraq and Pakistan. The task force experienced subsequent resignations from most of its senior leadership. Citing inability to rebuild a leadership team for a mission limited to a six month term in Afghanistan, Brinkley resigned July 1, 2011, his departure date coinciding with the retirement of Robert Gates.

== North America Western Asia Holdings ==
In October 2011, Brinkley co-founded North America Western Asia Holdings (NAWAH), with Thomas Pritzker serving as co-founder and chairman. According to its mission statement, NAWAH will "respect the history of the nations in which it operates, their culture and their people; commit our own capital to build and sustain great companies; partner equally with regional companies, remaining personally and professionally vested in their long-term success (and will) require our employees, suppliers, and partners operate in a transparent manner, following the highest ethical and international business standards." In October, 2012, NAWAH reached an agreement with the Iraqi government to invest up to $14 million to modernize operations at the Port of Maqal in the city of Basra, which has been largely inoperable since the Iran–Iraq War.

In October 2013, NAWAH announced the reopening of the port, marking less than one year during which NAWAH had rebuilt damaged port infrastructure and hired and trained an Iraqi workforce and management team. The port established a modern container terminal in the city center of Basra and provided a needed gateway for commercial goods into the growing Iraqi economy.

== Other pursuits ==
=== War Front to Store Front ===
Brinkley is the author of War Front to Store Front: Americans Rebuilding Trust and Hope in Nations Under Fire, published in 2014 by Turner Publishing. The book suggests changes to U.S. foreign policy in war-torn nations based on his seven years bridging the internal dynamics of the Pentagon with the conflict-zone realities of energizing international investment in Iraq and Afghanistan. Brinkley presented the book at the Center for Strategic and International Studies in February 2014.
