= Circuit Court of Cook County (1870–1964) =

The former Circuit Court of Cook County is a now-defunct court that existed in Cook County, Illinois from 1870 until 1964. It is one of many county courts that were merged to form the current court of the same name.

== History ==
After the effectuation of the Illinois Constitution of 1870, Cook County was given a circuit court with five judges. Included as the first two judges were the incumbent judge of the previously extant Cook County Recorder's Court and the judge of the previous Circuit Court. In July 1870, elections were held to fill the three other judgeships. The court replaced an earlier Circuit Court.

An amendment to the state constitution which took effect at the start of 1964 resulted in all Cook County courts being replaced and merged into a new Circuit Court of Cook County.

== Judges ==
Judges of the court included:

Judges of the Cook County Circuit Court (1870–1964)
Judges	Tenure	Notes
Erastus S. Williams	1870–1879	held over from earlier circuit court (elected to it in June 1867), re-elected in 1873
W. K. McAllister (first tenure)	1870–July 1871	held over from earlier Recorder's Court
W. W. Farwell	July 1870–July 1879	elected July 1870; re-elected in 1873
John G. Rogers		
Henry D. Booth		
Lambert Tree	July 1871–July 1875	elected in November 1871 (succeeded McAllister); re-elected in 1873 and 1875
W. K. McAllister (second tenure)	July 1870–July 1891	elected in November 1875 (succeeded Tree); re-elected in 1879 and 1885
Thomas A. Moran	July 1879–July 1891	elected June 1879 (succeeded Booth); re-elected 1885
Murry F. Tuley	July 1879–July 1891	elected in June 1879 (succeeded Williams); re-elected in 1885
William H. Barnum	July 1879–December 1884	elected in June 1879; resigned
Lorin C. Collins Jr.	1884–July 1891	appointed in 1884 (succeeded Barnum); re-elected in June 1885
Rollin S. Williamson	June 6, 1887 – August 11, 1889	died in office
George Driggs		elected in November 1889 special election (succeeded Williamson)
Edward Fitzsimmons Dunne	1892–1905	
Mary Bartelme	1913–1933	
Charles M. Thomson	1915–June 1927	
Hugo Friend	September 18, 1920 – April 29, 1966	
Otto Kerner Sr.	1927–1931	
Walter J. LaBuy	1933–1944	
Julius Howard Miner	1940–1958	
Thomas J. Courtney	1945–1964	remained judge on new Circuit Court until 1970
Thomas E. Kluczynski	1950–1963	
William J. Tuohy	1950–1963	

== Officials ==
Officials of the court included:

- Roswell B. Mason –master in chancery (1904–1934)
