= Sue Pritzker =

American socialite and philanthropist

- Born: Sue Ann Sandel; October 14, 1932; Chicago, Illinois, U.S.
- Died: May 5, 1982 (aged 49); San Francisco, California, U.S.
- Education: Radcliffe College
- Occupations: Activist; Philanthropist; Socialite
- Spouse(s): Donald Pritzker (m. 1958; died 1972); Frank Aries (divorced)
- Children: Penny Pritzker; Anthony Pritzker; JB Pritzker

Sue Ann Pritzker (née Sandel; October 14, 1932 – May 5, 1982) was an American socialite, philanthropist, and reproductive rights activist. She was the wife of Hyatt co-founder Donald Pritzker and the mother of U.S. Secretary of Commerce Penny Pritzker and Illinois Governor J.B. Pritzker.

== Early life and education ==
Pritzker was born Sue Sandel on October 14, 1932 in Chicago to Albert L. Sandel, a lamp manufacturer, and Dorothy J. Craig. She studied at the Francis W. Parker School in Chicago and graduated from Radcliffe College.

== Philanthropy and activism ==
Pritzker was involved with multiple charitable efforts that supported the Peninsula Children's Center, the San Francisco Art Institute, the San Francisco Opera Guild, the Museum of Modern Art, and the Jewish Welfare Federation.

She was active in Democratic causes and was a friend of Nancy Pelosi. In the 1970s, she was active in the abortion-rights movement, attending marches and demonstrations in California.

== Personal life ==
She married Donald Pritzker, co-founder of Hyatt, on June 10, 1958. They had three children: Penny Pritzker, Anthony Pritzker, and Jay Robert Pritzker. Her husband died in 1972. She married a second time to Frank Aries, a developer from Tucson, but they later divorced. Pritzker struggled with depression and alcoholism following the death of her first husband.

She lived in Menlo Park, California.

== Death ==
On May 5, 1982, Pritzker was killed when she was run over after jumping out of the cab of a tow truck that was pulling her Cadillac through San Francisco's Mission District. She was pronounced dead at the scene. Her funeral was held on May 7, 1982 at Congregation Beth Am in Los Altos Hills. She was buried in Memorial Park Cemetery in Skokie, Illinois.
