= Chip Conley =

American hotelier and writer (born 1960)

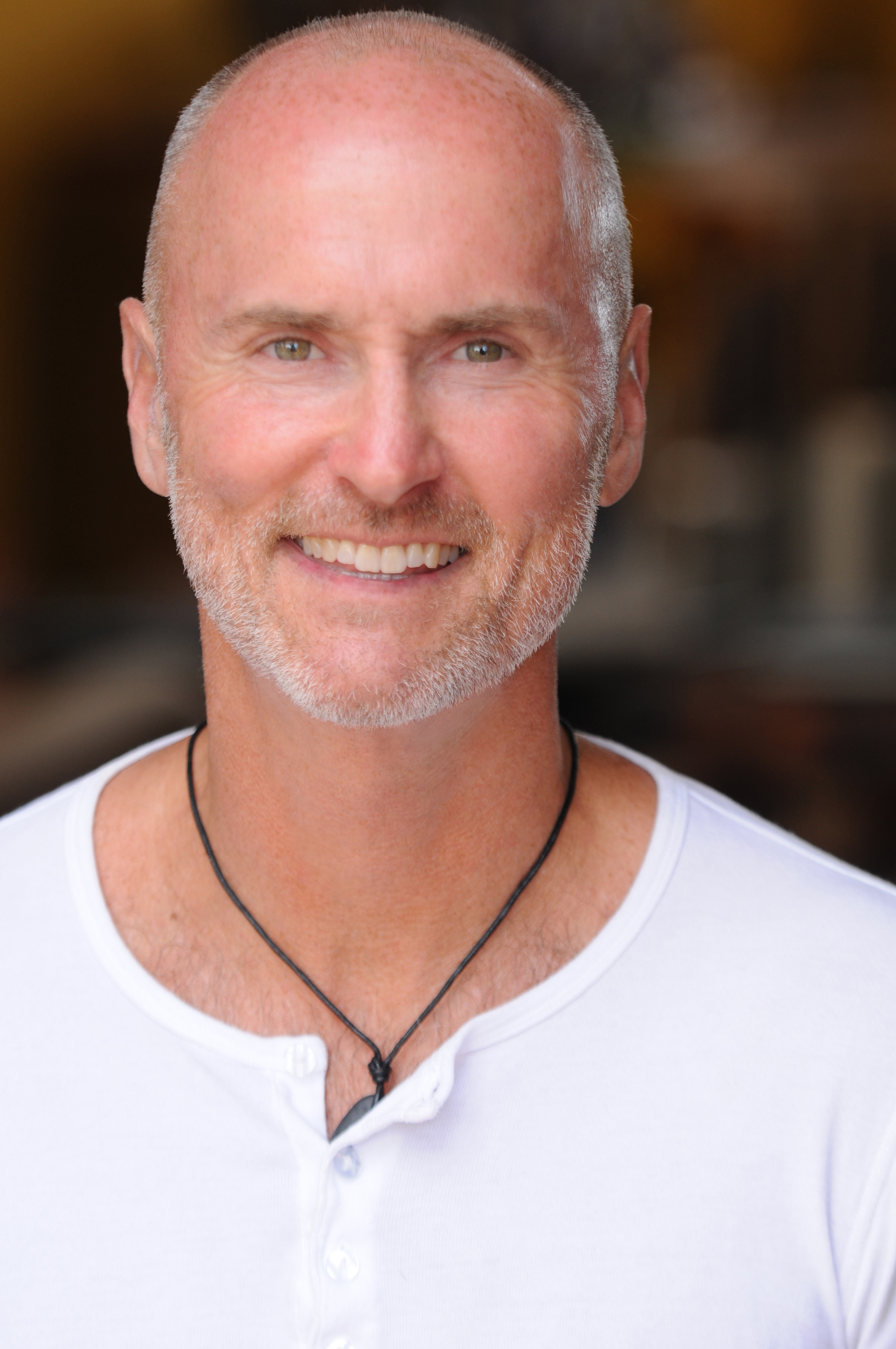
- Born: October 31, 1960 (age 65); Orange, California, U.S.
- Education: Stanford University
- Occupations: Author, Founder of Joie de Vivre Hospitality, Modern Elder Academy and Fest300, Former Airbnb Head of Global Hospitality & Strategy, Former Everfest Chief Strategy Officer

Chip Conley (born October 31, 1960) is an American hotelier, hospitality entrepreneur, author, and speaker.

== Early life and education ==
Conley was born in Orange, California and graduated from the PACE program at Long Beach Polytechnic High School. He received his BA in 1982 and an MBA in 1984 from Stanford University. He received an honorary doctorate from Saybrook University.

== Career ==
In 1987, Conley founded Joie de Vivre Hospitality, where he held the position of CEO for nearly 24 years, creating and managing around 50 boutique hotels. In 2010, he sold his company to Geolo Capital. The last hotel concept he created for the company was The Epiphany in Palo Alto. Conley remains a private owner in many hotel properties and no longer has an operating role in the company.

Conley spoke at the annual TED conference in 2010 on creating a business model driven by our need for meaning as outlined by Abraham Maslow's hierarchy of needs and as presented in his book Peak: How Great Companies Get their Mojo from Maslow. Conley's other books include The Rebel Rules: Daring to Be Yourself in Business; Marketing that Matters: 10 Practices to Profit Your Business and Change the World; Emotional Equations: Simple Truths for Creating Happiness + Success in Business + in Life; Wisdom@Work: The Making of a Modern Elder.

In 2013, Conley became Head of Global Hospitality and Strategy for Airbnb. and founded Fest300. At Airbnb, he was asked by the three co-founders to help evolve the company into a hospitality company with more than one million hosts in 191 countries. Conley worked closely with CEO Brian Chesky as a mentor and helped to build a bridge to the travel, hotel, and real estate/development/landlord industries. He also conceived and led the annual Airbnb Open. In 2017, he transitioned to the role of Strategic Advisor for Hospitality and Leadership.

In 2016, Fest300 was acquired by Everfest, with Conley joining the Everfest leadership team as Chief Strategy Officer on a part-time basis.

In 2018, he founded the Modern Elder Academy (MEA), which Conely describes as "the world's first midlife wisdom school" at its first campus in Baja California Sur. This 3-acre (1.2 ha) campus is located in the seaside village of El Pescadero. MEA hosts seminars, workshop retreats, and other similar programs (both in person and online) aimed at combating the popular conceptions of middle-age. MEA claims to have over 7000 alumni worldwide. Graduates receive a certificate in Mindset Management.

In 2021, Modern Elder Academy acquired Saddleback Ranch (renamed Rising Circle Ranch) in Lemy, New Mexico as their second campus.

== Community activism ==
Conley founded San Francisco's annual TNDC Celebrity Pool Toss fundraiser, which has raised millions for inner city families in San Francisco's Tenderloin District, where Conley's first hotel, the Phoenix, is located. He also created the annual Hotel Hero Awards that recognize the work of line-level hospitality staff. He served on the Glide Memorial Board for nearly a decade, as well as the boards for the Burning Man Project and the Esalen Institute. He now serves on the board of Encore.org and the advisory board for the Stanford Center for Longevity.

== Awards ==
- Northern California Real Estate Entrepreneur of the Year
- Bay Area's Most Innovative CEO
- ISHC Pioneer Award
- GLIDE Cecil Williams Legacy Award

== Books ==
- The Rebel Rules: Daring to be Yourself in Business; Simon & Schuster, 2001
- Marketing that Matters: 10 Practices to Profit Your Business and Change the World; co-authored with Eric Friedenwald-Fishman, Berrett-Koehler Publishers, 2006
- Peak: How Great Companies Get Their Mojo From Maslow; Jossey-Bass, 2007
- Emotional Equations: Simple Truths for Creating Happiness + Success in Business + Life; Simon & Schuster, 2012
- Wisdom@Work: The Making of a Modern Elder; Currency, 2018
