= Anthony Pritzker =

American businessman and philanthropist (born 1961)

- Born: Anthony Nicholas Pritzker; January 7, 1961 (age 65)
- Citizenship: American
- Education: Dartmouth College (BA); University of Chicago (MBA)
- Known for: Heir to the Hyatt Hotel fortune
- Spouse: Jeanne Kriser (m. 1989; sep. 2022)
- Children: 6
- Parents: Donald Pritzker (father); Sue Sandel (mother)
- Relatives: Pritzker family

Anthony Nicholas Pritzker (born January 7, 1961) is a member of the Pritzker family and an heir to the Hyatt Hotel fortune; he is managing partner of the Pritzker Group.

== Early life and education ==
Pritzker was born to a Jewish family, one of the three children of billionaire Donald Pritzker, founder of the Hyatt hotel chain, and abortion rights activist Sue Pritzker. He is the younger brother of former Secretary of Commerce Penny Pritzker and older brother of current Governor of Illinois JB Pritzker. He graduated from Menlo School in Atherton, California, Dartmouth College, and earned an MBA from the University of Chicago.

== Career ==
From January 1993 to December 1994, he was president of the Fenestra Corporation. From 1995 to 1996, he was a group executive at the Marmon Group and directed operations at Arzo, MD Tech, Micro-Aire, Oshkosh Door, and Fenestra. From 1996 to 1998, he was the Regional Vice President of Operations in Asia for Getz Bros. & Co. In 1998, he was appointed by the Marmon Group to oversee Stainless Industrial Companies. From 2000 to 2004, he was the President of Baker Tanks. He is managing partner of Pritzker Group. He is on the board of directors of Halcyon Ventures, Glenayre, Evercore Partners, and the Signicast Corporation. From 2004 to 2007, he was chairman of AmSafe Partners.

== Philanthropy ==
He is the chair of the UCLA Institute of the Environment and Sustainability board of advisors. He is a member of advisory board at the Center for Asia Pacific Policy of the RAND Corporation. He also sits on the board of trustees of the California Institute of the Arts, the board of directors of Heal the Bay, and the board of overseers of his alma mater, Dartmouth College. He has received awards from the Friends of Sheba Medical Center in Israel, Young Presidents' Organization, and the Brandeis-Bardin Institute. He has made charitable donations to the UCLA School of Law. In 2013, he hosted a benefit for the American Ballet Theatre.

== Personal life ==
As of March 2018, Pritzker is the 652nd-richest person in the world and the 219th richest in the U.S. He is worth $3.5 billion.

In 1989, he married Jeanne Kriser, who was raised in the Chicago suburbs; they have six children and reside in a 49,300-square-feet mansion designed by Ed Tuttle in Beverly Hills, California, the second-largest private residence in Los Angeles. Jeanne is the founder of Foster Care Counts, a charity dedicated to raising awareness of the plight of foster children. In 2022, Pritzker and Kriser separated after 33 years of marriage.
