= Jason Pomeranc =

American hotelier

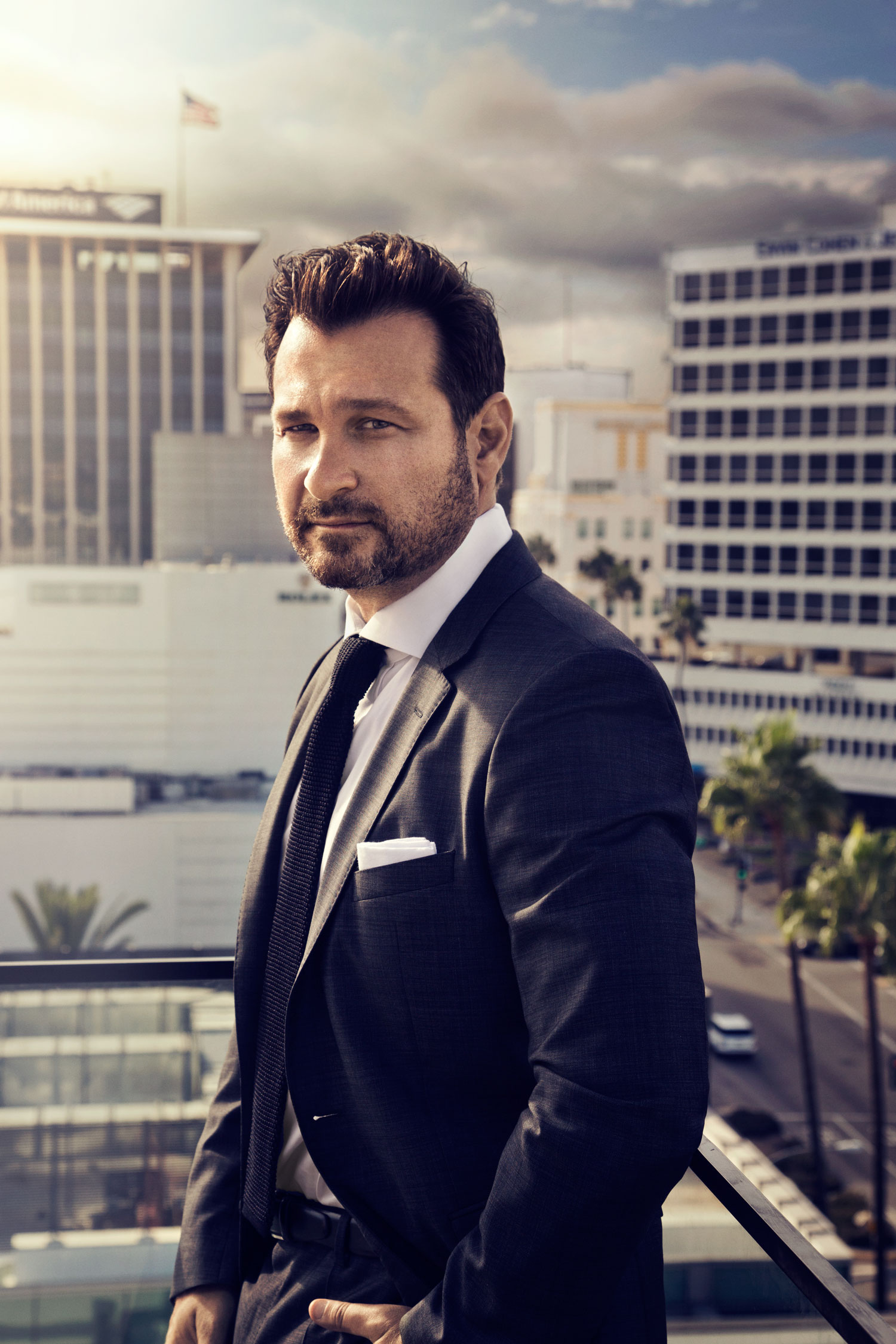
- Occupation: hotelier
- Known for: co-founder of Thompson Hotels Group
- Parent: Jack Pomeranc
- Family: Larry Pomeranc (brother); Michael Pomeranc (brother)

Jason Pomeranc is an American hotelier who co-founded SIXTY Collective, which launched the luxury lifestyle brand SIXTY Hotels. Previously he aided his father, Jack Pomeranc, in founding Thompson Hotels Group, now a part of Hyatt Hotels Corporation.

== Early life ==
Pomeranc was born to a Jewish family, the youngest son of Jack Pomeranc, a real estate developer. His parents were both Holocaust survivors. He has two brothers, Larry and Michael. He attended New York University and graduated with a Bachelor's Degree in Finance and a Juris Doctor degree from Cardozo Law School. After graduation, he worked for Rosenberg & Estis, a real estate firm which specializes in large-scale urban development such as the Condé Nast Building at 4 Times Square. In 1997, Pomeranc joined his family's real estate development firm, The Pomeranc Group.

== Business ==
In 2001, his father - with the help of Pomeranc and his two brothers - opened the 60 Thompson hotel in New York City, the first of the Thompson Hotel chain (which now includes the storied Hollywood Roosevelt Hotel). In October 2011, he merged the 12-hotel Thompson Hotel Group with the Pritzker family's 30-hotel Joie de Vivre chain to form Commune Hotels + Resorts with Pomeranc and John Pritzker serving as co-CEOs. In 2014, Jason Pomeranc announced the launch of SIXTY Hotels as part of his new hospitality company, SIXTY Collective, leaving his previous company, Commune Hotels + Resorts.
