= Daniel Pritzker =

American film director (born 1959)

- Born: 1959 (age 66–67)
- Education: Tufts University (BA); Northwestern University (JD)
- Occupations: Heir, musician, film director
- Spouse: Karen Edensword
- Children: 5
- Parent: Jay Pritzker (father)
- Relatives: See Pritzker family
- Family: Thomas Pritzker (brother); John Pritzker (brother); Jean "Gigi" Pritzker (sister)

Daniel Pritzker (born 1959) is an American billionaire heir, musician, film director, and member of the Pritzker family.

== Early life and education ==
Pritzker was born to a Jewish family, the son of Marian (née Friend) and Jay Pritzker. He is the grandson of A. N. Pritzker. He is a 1981 graduate of Tufts University and earned a Juris Doctor from Northwestern University Law School in 1986.

== Career ==
Daniel and his wife Karen are trustees of the Jay Pritzker Foundation, a philanthropic fund that created the Pritzker Challenge at Tufts with gifts of $10 million. The Pritzker Challenge is designed to encourage members of the Tufts community to establish endowed or term scholarships for underprivileged minority students. Pritzker was the founder, guitarist and songwriter for the Chicago band Sonia Dada.

Pritzker is ranked 353 in the 2020 list of "The 400 Richest Americans" by Forbes magazine, with a net worth of $2.4 billion.

He purchased Jerry Garcia's "Wolf" guitar for $790,000 in 2002. In 2017, he donated it to a charity auction, where Brian Halligan placed the winning bid totaling $1.9M. He keeps it at his private residence in Utica, New York

After many years, he directed a film about jazz pioneer Buddy Bolden which was released to theaters in May 2019. Originally titled Bolden! before being renamed to just Bolden, he funded the project from first draft to theatrical release because he felt the life of Buddy Bolden "was American history and tragedy of mythical proportion. From the outset I saw this as an opportunity to make an allegorical story about the soul of America."

== Personal life ==
Pritzker is married to Karen Edensword and has five children.

== Filmography ==
- Bolden (2019) - Director and writer
