= North America Western Asia Holdings =

Investment firm founded in 2011

North America Western Asia Holdings, (NAWAH)
- Industry: Investment
- Founded: 2011
- Website: www.nawah.com

North America Western Asia Holdings (NAWAH) is an investment firm founded in 2011. It was established by Hyatt Hotels executive chairman Thomas Pritzker and former Pentagon official Paul Brinkley to build businesses in the Middle East, Central Asia and North Africa.

NAWAH currently has two primary business units based in Iraq. NAWAH Port Management and NAWAH Supply & Distribution.

== NAWAH Business Units ==
=== NAWAH Port Management ===
NAWAH Port Management (NPM) operates a modernized, containerized berth at the Port of Basra (also known as Al Maqal Port).

=== NAWAH Supply & Distribution ===
NAWAH Supply & Distribution (NSD) is the exclusive distributor in Iraq for MRC Global, a distributor of pipe, valve, flange, fitting and other oil-related product and equipment needs of oil companies operating in Iraq. NSD's operational headquarters is in Zubair.

== Modernizing the Port of Basra ==
NAWAH announced in early October 2012 that it had entered into a 10-year, $14 million agreement with Iraq's Ministry of Transportation and General Company for the Ports of Iraq to modernize the Port of Basra.

The project, completed in October 2014, in record time, saw the construction of a 20,000 square meter lay down yard and a new administrative headquarters as well as being equipped with a Liebherr 180 Mobile Harbor Crane and a Liebherr 645 Reachstacker.

== History and Leadership ==
Thomas Pritzker and Paul Brinkley met while Brinkley was the Deputy Undersecretary of Defense leading the Task Force for Business and Stability Operations, the Department of Defense agency tasked with drawing investors first to Iraq and later Afghanistan. At the Task Force, Brinkley recruited dozens of American business executives to tour Iraq and Afghanistan, including top officials at Honeywell, IBM, and Boeing. Several firms later made investments in those countries.

In 2010, Brinkley told the World Affairs Council of Northern California that:

“[Recruitment] was the easiest part of my job. I have yet to find that I can’t take an American businessman, ideally in his mid-forties, going through a raging midlife crisis, take this guy to a war zone, show him around with our troops, and then put him in front of a general. All the general needs to say is, ‘I need you to help.’ The hit rate – my success rate – on that model is extremely high.”

In 2008, Pritzker visited Baghdad with Morgan Stanley Vice Chairman William Strong and CF Industries Holdings CEO Stephen Wilson. The three later wrote an editorial in the Chicago Tribune about their experience. In 2011, Pritzker toured Bamyan Province, Afghanistan with his wife on a Task Force-sponsored trip.
