= General Assembly (school) =

Information
- Type: Private
- Established: 2011
- Founders: Jake Schwartz, Adam Pritzker, Matthew Brimer, and Brad Hargreaves
- Campus: Urban
- Website: generalassemb.ly

General Assembly is an American-headquartered private, for-profit education organization founded by CEO Jake Schwartz, Adam Pritzker, Matthew Brimer, and Brad Hargreaves in early 2011 and purchased by the Adecco Group in 2018. It maintains campuses in various countries throughout the world to teach entrepreneurs and business professionals practical technology skills. It provides courses in mobile and software engineering, data science, product management, and other digital technology–related courses.

== History ==
General Assembly began in early 2011 as a co-working space in Midtown Manhattan, and evolved into a private school. It built its first campus in the Flatiron District with a grant from the New York City Economic Development Corporation. In 2015 the company raised $70 million in venture capital funding. As of September 2016, General Assembly has 15 campus locations on 4 continents.

In April 2018, human resources services company Adecco Group announced they were acquiring General Assembly for $413 million.

== Course offerings ==
The school offers short courses, online classes (including overnight courses and free short online courses), and immersive 10- and 12- week courses in computer programming, data science, and product management, with an emphasis on web development and user experience design. Approximately 20% of its courses are offered through companies to their employees. In 2016 it worked with accounting firms to develop a framework for assessing student outcomes that it plans to market to other private educational institutions.

General Assembly is not accredited but has been approved by the California Bureau for Private Postsecondary Education.

Local General Assembly branches have provided discounted programs sponsored by the charity Get Well Cities for training the homeless. On Women's Equality Day in 2016 the company launched a hashtag campaign, #ilooklikeadeveloper, and scheduled events around the world focusing on women in computing.
