= Khaite =

Luxury women's wear brand

Khaite is a New York-based luxury women's wear brand founded in 2016 by Catherine Holstein. Khaite's original store is located in Soho at 165 Mercer Street.

== History ==
In 2016, Adam Pritzker made a co-founding investment in Khaite.

In March 2021, Sean Baker released the short film Khaite FW21 produced to promote its Fall/Winter 2021 lineup. Sean Price Williams served as cinematographer.

In 2023, Oliver Peoples collaborated with Khaite.

Katie Holmes and Gemma Chan have worn the brand. In 2026 the brand opened its sixth US store at the Bal Harbour Shops.

== See also ==
- Miu Miu
- The Row
