= Jay Pritzker =

Cofounder of Hyatt Hotels Corp (1922–1999)

- Born: Jay Arthur Pritzker; August 26, 1922; Chicago, Illinois, U.S.
- Died: January 23, 1999 (aged 76); Chicago, Illinois, U.S.
- Education: University of Chicago; Northwestern University (BS, JD)
- Known for: Co-founder of Hyatt Corporation
- Spouse: Cindy Friend
- Children: 5, including Thomas, John, Daniel, Gigi
- Parent: Abram Nicholas Pritzker (father)
- Relatives: See Pritzker family

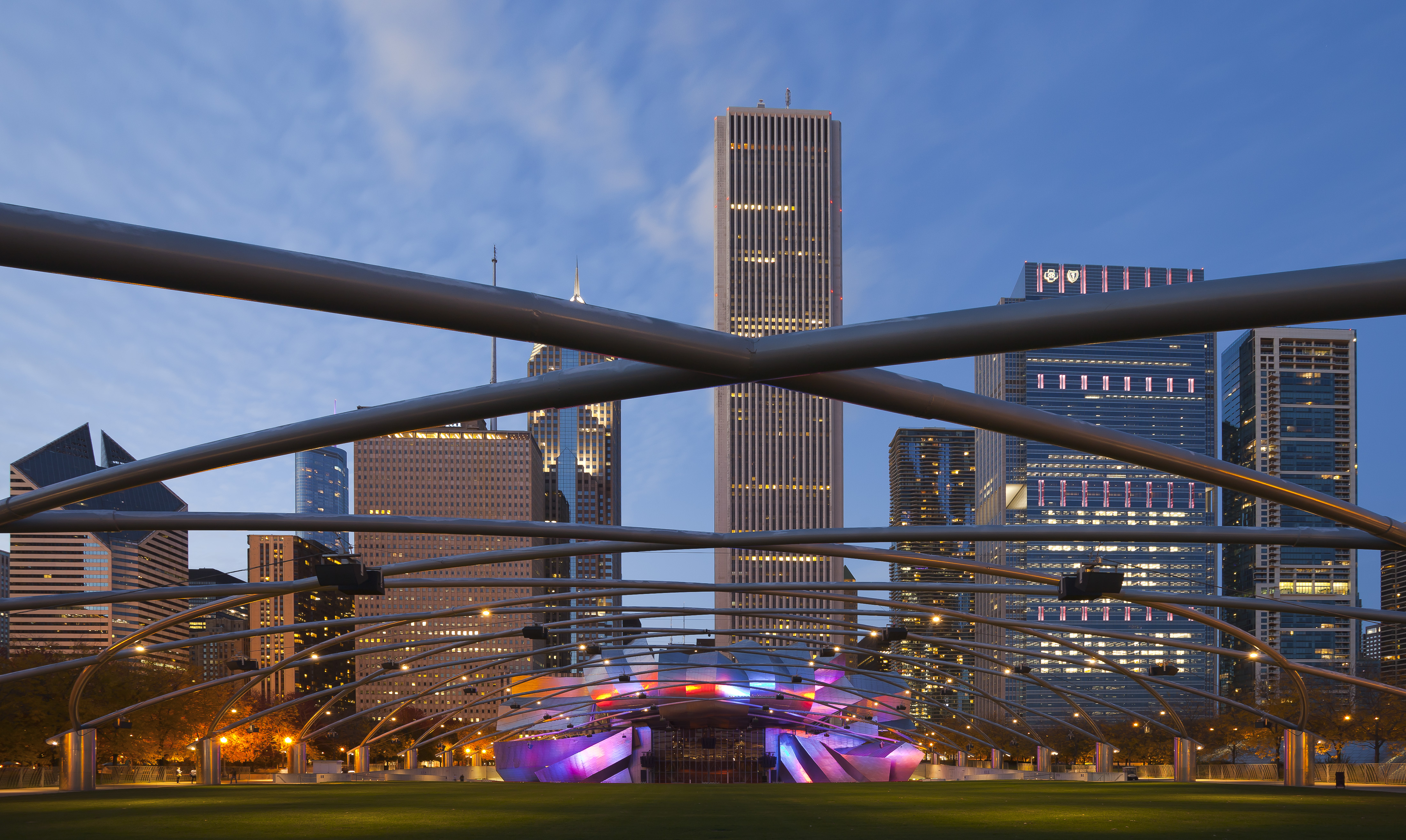
Jay Pritzker Pavilion, Chicago, Illinois

Jay Arthur Pritzker (August 26, 1922 – January 23, 1999) was an American businessman and member of the Pritzker family. He was a founder of the Hyatt Corporation, having purchased the first Hyatt Hotel in 1957, and was responsible for the corporation's evolution into a multinational hospitality conglomerate.

== Early life and education ==
Pritzker was born in Chicago, Illinois to Jewish parents. Pritzker's grandparents emigrated to the United States in 1881 from Kyiv. A son of Fanny (née Doppelt) and Abram Nicholas Pritzker, he had two brothers: Donald and Robert Pritzker. At the age of 14, Pritzker was admitted to the University of Chicago. He then went on to graduate with a B.S. from Northwestern University in 1941 and a J.D. from the Northwestern University School of Law in 1947. Pritzker served in WWII as a naval aviator.

== Career ==
Pritzker diversified the Chicago-based family business—which then consisted of the Pritzker & Pritzker law firm run by his uncle, Harry, and the investments made by his father and his uncle, Jack—into the Marmon Group holding company. With his brother, Robert, he built a portfolio of 60 diversified industrial corporations. He created the Hyatt Hotel chain in 1957 with his brother Donald Pritzker and owned Braniff Airlines from 1983–1988.

In 1979 he established the Pritzker Architecture Prize. In 1982, he acquired Ticketmaster and expanded it before selling 80% for more than $325 million to Microsoft co-founder Paul Allen in 1993.

In 1979, Pritzker received the Golden Plate Award of the American Academy of Achievement.

In 1996, he and his wife, Cindy, received the National Building Museum's Honor Award. In 2004, the Jay Pritzker Pavilion, designed by architect Frank Gehry, was completed as part of Millennium Park in downtown Chicago.

== Personal life ==
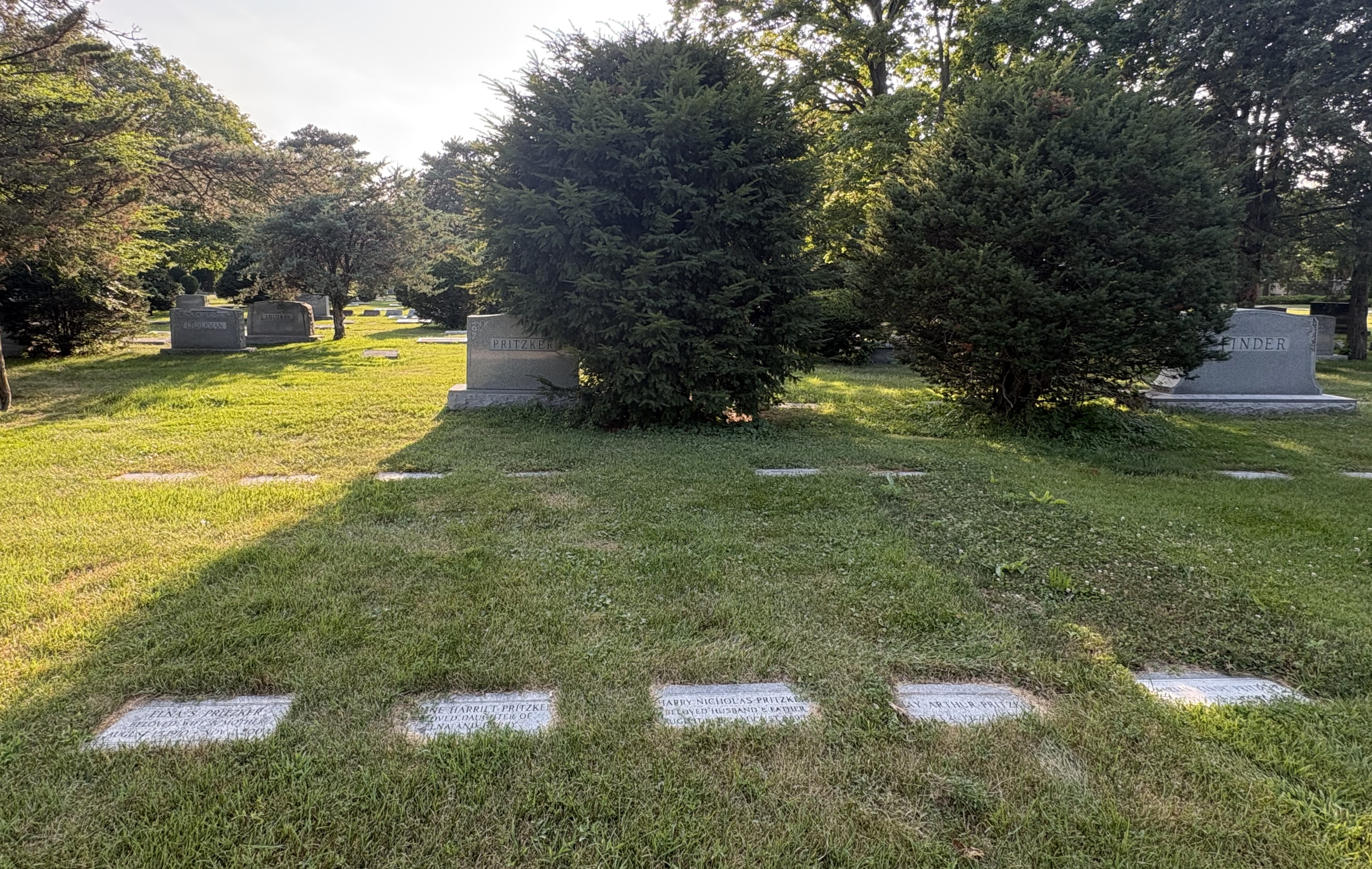
Pritzker's grave (front row, second from right) at Memorial Park Cemetery

Pritzker was married to Marian "Cindy" Friend, the daughter of Illinois appellate judge Hugo Friend, for 51 years. They had five children:

- Nancy Pritzker (1948–1972), died by suicide at age 24. The University of Chicago medical school is named for her.
- Thomas Pritzker (born 1950), served as chairman of Hyatt Foundation, chairman of Marmon Holdings, and as a director of Royal Caribbean, and the Pritzker Foundation.
- John Pritzker (born 1953), runs his own private equity firm Geolo Capital, which focuses on investments in hospitality, entertainment and health and wellness companies. In 2010, he purchased a majority interest in the Joie de Vivre hotel chain and later merged it with the Pomeranc family's Thompson Hotel Group.
- Daniel Pritzker (born 1959), musician and filmmaker who served as a trustee of the Jay Pritzker Foundation along with his wife, Karen. He also founded the Jay Pritzker Academy in Ta Chet, Cambodia; and is a prominent supporter of Providence St. Mel School in Chicago and Tufts University. He is the owner of Jerry Garcia's famed guitar "Wolf", which he purchased at auction for $789,500.
- Jean "Gigi" Pritzker (born 1962), film and play producer and CEO of Odd Lot Entertainment.

Jay Pritzker died at Northwestern Memorial Hospital in Chicago on January 23, 1999, and was buried at Memorial Park Cemetery in Skokie.

== See also ==
- Smith v. Van Gorkom
- Pritzker family
- The ITT Wars
