= Everfest =

American festival company

Orion Network Enterprises, Inc.
- Trade name: d/b/a Everest
- Founded: 2014
- Founders: Jay Manickam; Paul Cross; Brad Dixon
- Defunct: June 1, 2020
- Headquarters: Austin, Texas, United States
- Website: www.everfest.com

Everfest was an Austin-based company that connects the festival community online. Festival-goers can find worldwide festivals, connect with friends, build a calendar and share content about festival experiences. Festival organizers work with Everfest to manage their online presence and market their event to attendees, including a perk system that allows organizers to provide discounts or free items to festival-goers.

Everfest includes festivals of all types, grouping them across 12 categories: art, book, civic, cultural, faith, food, film, historical, music, performance, seasonal, and unique. The platform uses an algorithm to recommend festivals to festival-goers based on their likes and locations, as well as festivals they prefer or have attended previously.

== History ==
Everfest was founded in the summer of 2014 by Jay Manickam (co-founder of uShip), Paul Cross (founder of Ticketbud), and Brad Dixon.

In February 2015, Everfest was named one of 50 Startups to Watch by Built In Austin.

In April 2015, Everfest closed an angel round of funding totalling $1.5 million, which included notable individual investor Bob Kagle (founder of Benchmark Capital) and a group from ATX Seed Ventures. Everfest appeared on Product Hunt on April 5, posted by Ryan Hoover (founder of Product Hunt), and finished the day as the second-most upvoted product.

Everfest was named to the Austin Chamber of Commerce's Austin A-List of Hottest Startups on May 14, 2015, one of 12 winners from a pool of 275 nominees. They were one of four winners from 160 in the Emerging category.

In February 2016, Everfest was named one of Fast Company's Most Innovative Companies of 2016.

In September 2016, Everfest acquired competitor Fest300, with Chip Conley (Burning Man, Airbnb, Joie de Vivre Hotels) joining as Chief Strategy Officer in a part-time capacity.

Everfest closed a $3.6 million Series A round of venture capital funding in June 2017. The round was co-led by Live Nation Entertainment and ATX Seed Ventures. Charlie Walker of C3 Presents and Chris Shonk of ATX Seed Ventures joined Everfest's board of directors as part of the deal.

In February 2020, Everfest was acquired by Qcue, an Austin company that provides dynamic pricing software for live entertainment events. Terms of the deal were not disclosed.

On June 1, 2020 the company's Instagram posted their last message as of 9 July 2024.

== Philanthropy ==
Everfest competed in the 2015 Austin Startup Games as part of the ATX Seed Ventures team, earning a $1,000 donation to The Bunker, Austin.
