= Hugo Friend =

American judge

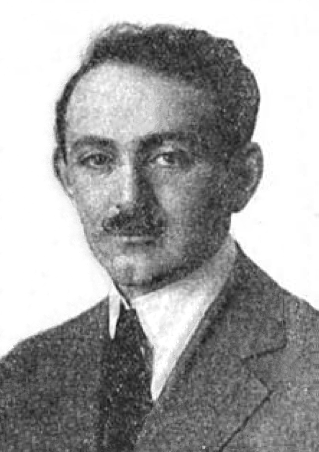
- Friend, circa 1921

Judge of the Circuit Court of Cook County, Illinois
- In office September 18, 1920 – April 29, 1966
- Appointed by: Frank O. Lowden

Personal details
- Born: Hugo Morris Friend; July 21, 1882 Benešov, Prague, Kingdom of Bohemia, Austria-Hungary (now Czech Republic)
- Died: April 29, 1966 (aged 83) Chicago, Illinois, U.S.
- Resting place: Rosehill Cemetery
- Spouse: Sadie Cohn (1920–1966; his death)
- Children: Marian "Cindy" Friend
- Education: University of Chicago (undergraduate and law)
- Occupation: Judge

Medal record

Men's athletics

Representing the United States

Olympic Games
Bronze medal – third place	1906 Athens	Long jump

Hugo Morris Friend (July 21, 1882 – April 29, 1966) was an American jurist who, in his youth, competed as an athlete in the long jump and hurdles. He is best remembered as the judge who presided over the criminal trial of the Chicago Black Sox, which ended in an acquittal. Eight players were ultimately banned from professional baseball for life.

Friend was born in Benešov, but came to the United States at an early age. He attended the University of Chicago beginning in 1901, where he became a track star. He was selected for the United States team for the 1906 Intercalated Games in Athens, Greece and won a bronze medal.

He became a lawyer in 1908 and a judge twelve years later. He presided over the Black Sox trial in 1921, and when the defendants were acquitted, he responded to the jubilation in the courtroom with a smile. At the time of his 1966 death, he was the oldest active member of the Cook County Circuit Court bench, having served on both its post-1964 iteration and its original (pre-1964) iteration.

== Early life and athletic career ==
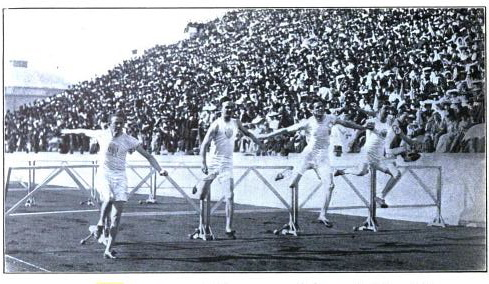
The 1906 Athens games 110 metres hurdles final; Friend at left

Hugo Morris Friend, who was Jewish, was born on July 21, 1882, in the city of Prague, in what was then the Austrian province of Bohemia. At an early age, he emigrated to the United States. He graduated from South Division High School in Chicago in 1901.

Friend attended the University of Chicago, where he was a track star. He twice won the Big Ten long jump championship. Friend was the captain of Chicago's Big Ten champion track team, the first time one of the university's teams had won the Big Ten Championship. He was selected for the United States team for the 1906 Intercalated Games (sometimes termed the 1906 Olympic Games) in Athens and won a bronze medal in the long jump, finishing fourth in the 100 metre hurdles. He also played football in college, though never at the varsity level.

Friend received his undergraduate degree in 1906; he continued at the university and secured his J.D. degree in 1908.

== Lawyer and judge ==
Friend's grave at Rosehill Cemetery

Friend joined the Illinois Bar in 1908, and began the practice of law in Chicago. In 1916, he was appointed a Master in Chancery of the Superior Court of Cook County by Judge Albert C. Barnes, a position he held for four years. On September 18, 1920, Republican Governor Frank Lowden appointed him to the Cook County Circuit Court.

In 1921, Judge Friend was assigned the Chicago "Black Sox" case; eight ex-White Sox players had been suspended from baseball after being indicted for throwing the 1919 World Series, along with several gamblers and go-betweens. The case had been marked by theft of the incriminating statements made by some of the players to the grand jury. At the conclusion of the evidence, Judge Friend said of the cases against two of the players, Buck Weaver and Happy Felsch, that they were so weak that he doubted if he could let the convictions stand. He was not called upon to do so; all of the defendants were acquitted amid scenes of jubilation, observed by a smiling Judge Friend. The following day, Baseball Commissioner Kenesaw Mountain Landis issued a statement stating that no player who had agreed to throw a baseball game, or sat in on meetings to that end, would ever play professional baseball thereafter.

In 1928, Friend presided over the case against Chicago Mayor William Hale Thompson and three codefendants, ordering them to repay to the city over $2 million that had been paid to real estate experts. He was reversed in his judgment against Mayor Thompson and one of the co-defendants by the Illinois Supreme Court.

In 1957, he cleared the way for the movie The Miracle to be shown in Chicago, ruling it was not obscene. He died on April 29, 1966, at age 83 the oldest active Cook County Circuit Court judge, while listening to the broadcast of a Chicago White Sox–Cleveland Indians game. He was buried at Rosehill Cemetery.

He was elected in 2006 into the University of Chicago Athletic Hall of Fame. His listing cites his 1906 "Olympic" accomplishments and his Big Ten feats, including his track team captaincy.

== Personal life ==
In 1920, Friend married Sadie Cohn of Chicago. His daughter, Marian "Cindy" Friend, was married to businessman Jay Pritzker and member of the Pritzker family.

== See also ==
- List of select Jewish track and field athletes
