= Joie de Vivre Hospitality =

Collection hotel chain

Joie de Vivre Hospitality JdV by Hyatt
- Type: Private
- Industry: Hospitality
- Founded: 1987 (San Francisco, CA)
- Headquarters: San Francisco, California, USA
- Number of locations: 52 (2024)
- Key people: Chip Conley (founder); John Pritzker (chairman); Niki Leondakis (CEO); Michael J. Wisner (CFO)
- Services: hotels, hotel management, restaurants, bars
- Revenue: $240 million USD (2009)
- Number of employees: 2,500 (2010)
- Parent: Hyatt Hotels & Resorts
- Website: jdvhotels.com

Joie de Vivre Hospitality is a hotel and restaurant company based in San Francisco, California, and the second-largest operator of boutique hotels in the United States. Due to its ownership by Hyatt Hotels & Resorts, it is currently branded as JdV by Hyatt, under which five further sub-brands also operate.

== History ==
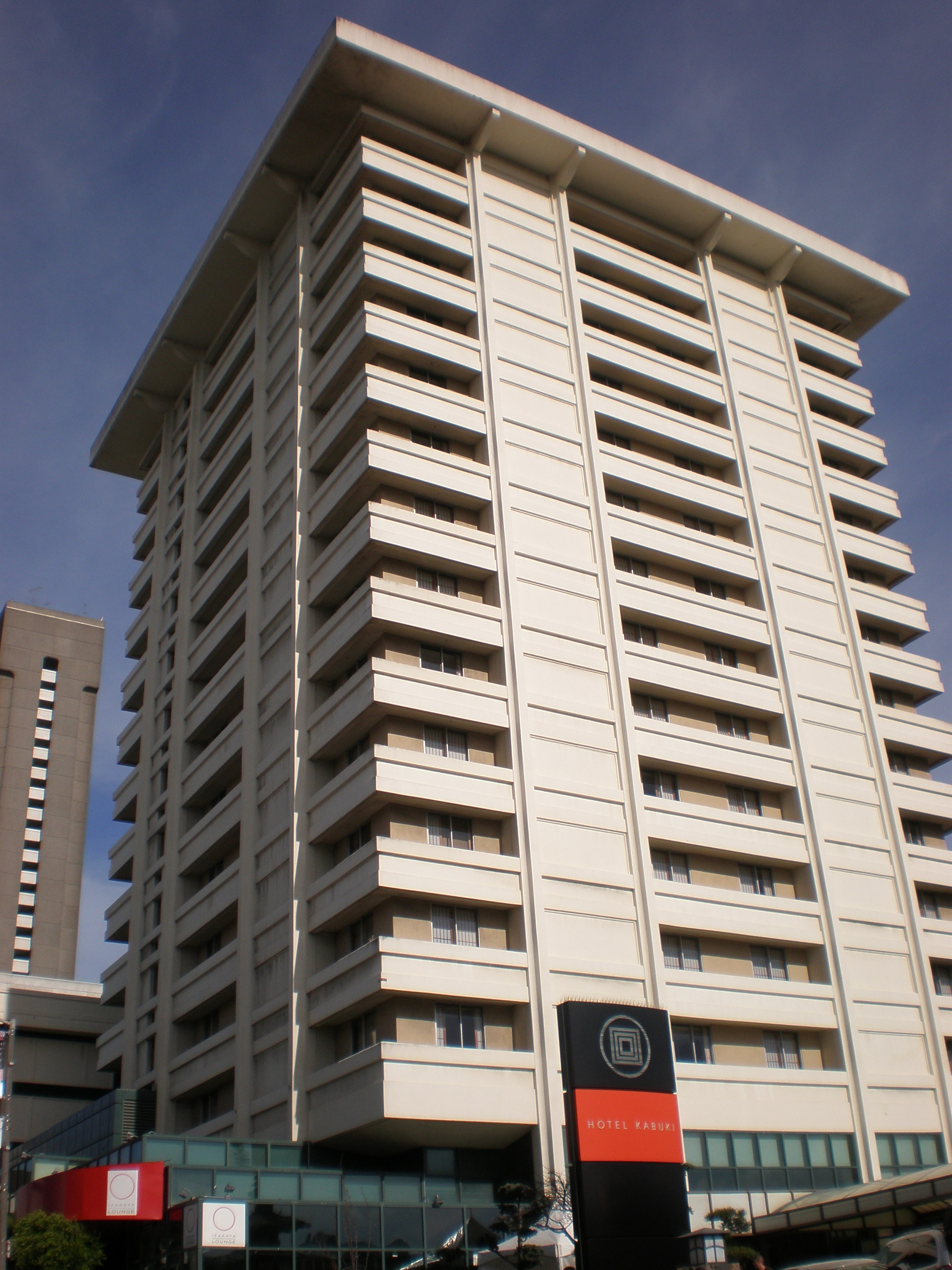
Hotel Kabuki, operated by JdV by Hyatt, in San Francisco

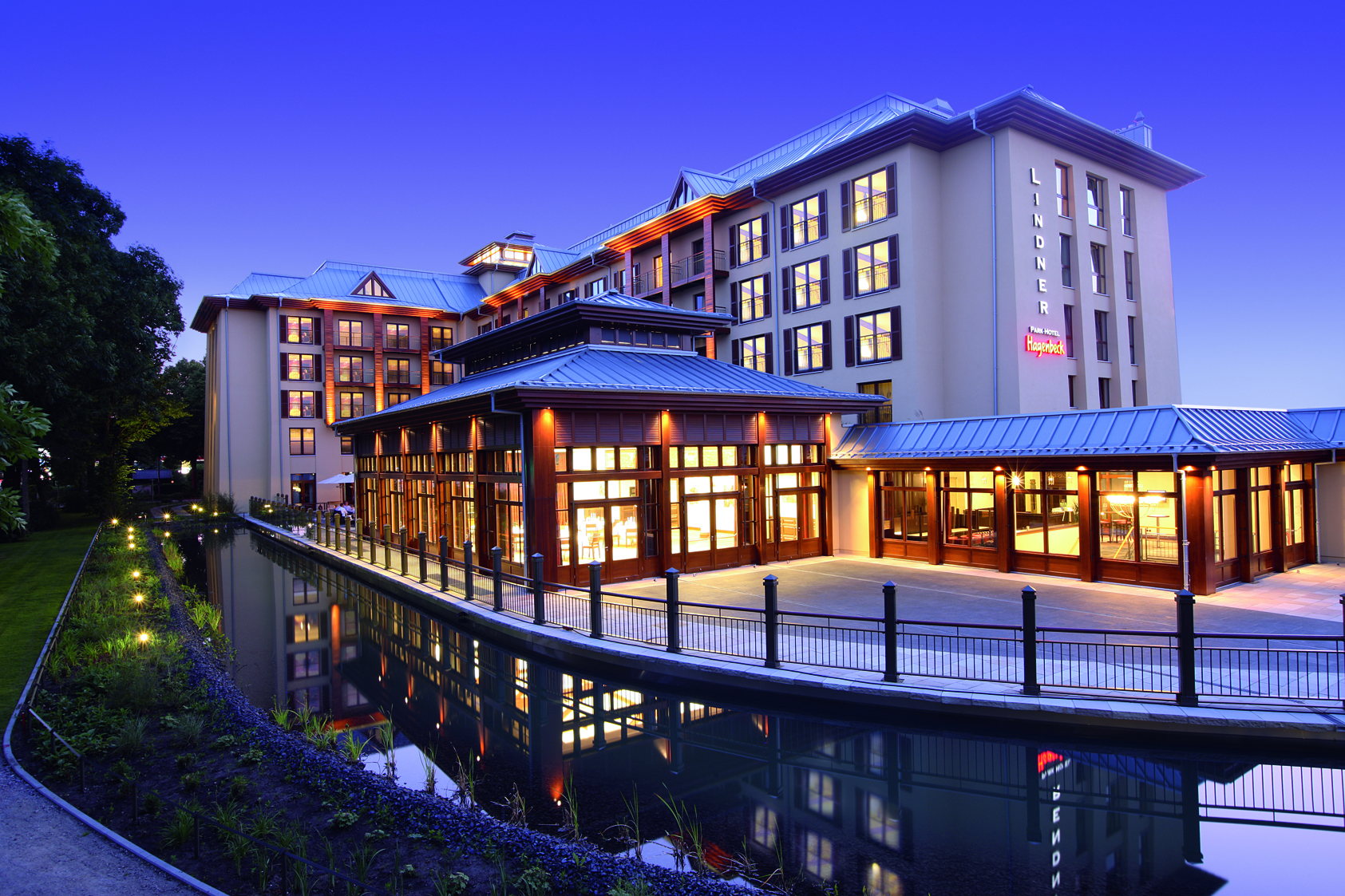
Lindner Hotel, part of JdV by Hyatt in Hamburg

=== Foundation and early years ===
The company was founded in 1987 by Chip Conley, then 26, after he became "disillusioned" with the corporate real estate market 2½ years out of Stanford Business School. Conley raised $1 million in 1987 to buy the decrepit Phoenix Hotel in San Francisco's Tenderloin neighborhood, where he opened the landmark restaurant Miss Pearl's Jam House with Joey Altman. Conley modeled the name after Esprit, the clothing company then based in San Francisco. Initially targeting traveling rock bands, musicians, and filmmakers, Conley met with travel agents throughout the United States, modeled the hotel's concept after Rolling Stone Magazine, and offered tour managers free massages to induce them to book their bands' stays at the Phoenix. A popular but not financial success, the hotel began to attract nationally known entertainers such as David Bowie, Linda Ronstadt, and Johnny Depp, even though the hotel was essentially a low-budget 1950s era motel. With support from investors, Conley bought a series of moderately sized, often run-down buildings, which he turned at low cost into boutique hotels, in each case creating a different "psychographic" concept such as new age wellness, men's health, romance novels, New Yorker Magazine, or luxury camping.

The company, which had been based in San Francisco, suffered a substantial downturn after 9/11 and the dot com crash, which affected San Francisco more than most other hospitality markets. With 22 capital calls from investors and cuts in executive salaries, the company survived and, rather than closing poorly performing properties or laying off staff, took advantage of lower commercial real estate prices to expand throughout California. The company also began to take over and control its hotel restaurants to reduce risk. As of 2008 the company owns more than 30 hotels, manages 6 others, and operates 18 restaurants, all within California. Among the most famous is the Ventana Inn in Big Sur, California. The Hotel Vitale, on San Francisco's waterfront, is the first hotel the company built, rather than bought from a previous owner. The company also expanded into managing hotels and condominium amenities for other owners.

Starting in 2005 with Hotel Angeleno in Los Angeles, Joie de Vivre began expansion into southern California, and in 2009 opened Shorebreak Hotel in Huntington Beach, Hotel Erwin in Venice Beach, and Pacific Edge Hotel in Laguna Beach.

=== Development since 2010 ===
In 2010, a majority stake of Joie de Vivre was purchased by Geolo Capital, the private equity firm founded by Hyatt Hotels heir John Pritzker. A $150 million fund to acquire additional hotels was established as part of the deal, with plans to acquire $300 million to $500 million in hotels over a three-to-five-year period. In September 2010, Joie de Vivre announced Gary M. Beasley, a partner at Geolo Capital, as its interim chief executive officer. With this appointment, founder Chip Conley became executive chairman and chief creative officer.

In 2011, Joie de Vivre expanded outside of California converting the Hotel Theodore in Scottsdale, Arizona into The Saguaro. The following year in March, Joie de Vivre opened the Hotel Lincoln in Chicago. In October 2011, Joie de Vivre merged with Thompson Hotels, an international luxury hotel chain based in New York, with the two brands operating under a newly created parent company, Commune Hotels & Resorts. One of Thompson Hotels' founders, Stephen Brandman, was named CEO of the new company. Another Thompson founder, Jason Pomeranc, was named co-chairman along with John Pritzker. Chip Conley, Joie de Vivre's founder, retained equity in the new company and remained involved as a strategic advisor.

The company expanded to Hawaii in June 2012 with the Coconut Waikiki Hotel and the Seaside Hotel Waikiki (rebranded as the Shoreline Hotel Waikiki in 2013), both in Honolulu. In November 2012, Commune appointed Niki Leondakis, previously president and chief operating officer of Kimpton Hotels & Restaurants, as CEO of the company. In May 2013, Commune Hotels & Resorts announced the launch of tommie, a value-oriented brand of hotels, with the first two hotels planned to debut in 2015 in New York City. In August 2013, John Pritzker purchased the rest of Commune's stake from Jason Pomeranc through Geolo Capital, for an undisclosed sum, thereby gaining full control of the company. In March 2014, the company opened The Epiphany Hotel in Palo Alto, California. In 2016, Joie de Vivre no longer managed the Saguaro hotels both Scottsdale and Palm Springs, with management turning over to the Sydell Group.

As of 2019, stays at the chain can earn points in the Hyatt loyalty program. In October 2019, the first Joie de Vivre branded hotel outside of US, BEI Zhaolong Hotel, opened in Beijing.

In 2022, German hotel chain Lindner Hotels & Resorts and its subsidiary me and all Hotels signed a franchise and cooperation agreement, rebranding its hotels as part of JdV by Hyatt and expanding the Joie de Vivre portfolio with over 30 European properties.

== Locations ==
As of March 2024, the Joie de Vivre chain comprises 52 hotels in 14 countries. There are five sub-brands operating under the JdV by Hyatt banner, including The Tribune, First Name, Story Hotels, Lindner Hotels & Resorts and Tommie Hollywood. The countries with the most hotels are the United States (17 locations) and Germany (16, most branded as Lindner Hotels & Resorts) followed by Sweden (3), Canada (2), Taiwan (2), and one property each in Austria, Belgium, Czech Republic, Dominican Republic, France, India, Italy, Slovakia, and Spain.
