= Donald Pritzker =

American businessman (1932–1972)

- Born: Donald Nicholas Pritzker; October 31, 1932; Chicago, Illinois, U.S.
- Died: May 6, 1972 (aged 39); Honolulu, Hawaii, U.S.
- Education: Harvard University (BA); University of Chicago (JD)
- Occupation: Businessman
- Title: President of the Hyatt Corporation
- Spouse: Sue Sandel (m. 1958)
- Children: Penny; Anthony; Jay
- Parent: Abram Nicholas Pritzker (father)
- Relatives: Pritzker family

Donald Nicholas Pritzker (October 31, 1932 – May 6, 1972) was an American businessman. He was a member of the Pritzker family and served as the president of Hyatt, where he helped grow the hotel chain.

== Early life and education ==
Pritzker was born to a Jewish family in Chicago, Illinois, the son of Fanny (née Doppelt) and A. N. Pritzker. He had two older brothers: Jay Pritzker (1922–1999) and Robert Pritzker (1926–2011). Pritzker studied at the Francis W. Parker School, and graduated with a B.A. from Harvard University as well as a J.D. from the University of Chicago Law School.

== Career ==
In 1961, after he graduated from law school, he went to work for the family company, the Marmon Group. His elder brother Jay Pritzker assigned him the task of managing the Hyatt Hotel chain. Donald moved to Atherton, California, and went about developing the chain and soon became Hyatt's president. In 1967, the Pritzkers bought a newly built hotel in downtown Atlanta out of bankruptcy which had an unusual design consisting of a 21-story atrium lobby with external glass elevators, fountains, and caged tropical birds. Donald renamed it the Hyatt Regency Atlanta; it became an instant success and served as the architectural model for all future Hyatt hotels.

Donald was credited with "setting the tone for the culture and philosophy at Hyatt" and presided over its growth from a six hotel chain to the 5th largest hotel chain in the world at the time of his death.

== Personal life ==
On June 10, 1958, Donald Pritzker married Sue Sandel (1932–1982), daughter of Albert L. Sandel (1902–1967) and Dorothy J. Craig (1904–1998). She also studied at the Francis W. Parker School and graduated from Radcliffe College. They had three children:

- Penny Pritzker (born 1959), the 38th United States Secretary of Commerce
- Anthony Pritzker (born 1961), managing partner of the Pritzker Group.
- JB Pritzker (born 1965), managing partner of the Pritzker Group and Governor of Illinois. and the 512th richest person in the world.

== Death ==
Pritzker died in 1972 at age 39 of a heart attack while playing tennis at a Hyatt hotel in Honolulu. His wife died 10 years later in an accident at age 49.
