= Mandara Spa =

Indonesian global spa management company

Mandara Spa is a global spa management company founded in Bali and now under the company Steiner Leisure Limited, publicly listed in Nasdaq (STNR). Steiner was purchased in 2016 by private equity firm Catterton.

The name Mandara comes from an ancient Sanskrit legend about the gods' quest to find the elixir of immortality and eternal youth. Mandara Spa has commercially exploited this legend.

== History ==
Founded in Bali, Indonesia in 1996 by Thomas Gottlieb and John Pritzker, Mandara Spa was one of the pioneers of the tropical Asian spa experience. The first Mandara Spa opened in May 1996 at The Chedi (now Alila Ubud) in Ubud, Bali. In 1998, it began operating in Malaysia and the following year, in 1999, it expanded into the Maldives and Thailand. In 1998, Mandara Spa formed the US-based division, headquartered in Hawaii, to develop spas outside of Asia.

== Shiseido Company ==
Mandara Spa ceased to be a 100% privately owned company in 2000, when Shiseido Co. of Japan bought a 40% stake in its worldwide operations. In 2001, the remaining 60% of shares were sold to Steiner Leisure Limited, a Nasdaq (STNR) listed company.

== Steiner Leisure Ltd ==
In December 2002 Steiner Leisure Limited became the sole owner of Mandara Spa after acquiring the 40% equity interests from Shiseido. Steiner Leisure Limited is a global provider of spa services and operations, a manufacturer and distributor of skin, body and hair care products and an accredited educator teaching massage, skincare, and spa management. Steiner Leisure's Maritime and Resort Spa divisions operate in over 175 venues on land and at sea. Mandara Spa now operates as a wholly owned subsidiary of Steiner Leisure, with Jeff Matthews as president and Chief Operating Officer of its Asian, and middle eastern region and Bruce Pine, Senior Vice-president and Chief Operating Officer, Land-based spas, in all other regions.

== Business Model ==
Mandara Spa is a spa management company, it is not an owning company. The company operates much the same as a hotel Management Company would. A hotel owner or manager offers up space, Mandara Spa comes in and does everything from design & construction, right through to fit out. Mandara Spa also designs the treatment menu and brings in the staff. Finally, Mandara Spa continues to manage the business on an ongoing basis. The business model for Mandara Spa varies according to the needs of each hotel. In some cases, Mandara Spa takes a percentage of revenues & profits, just like a hotel company would. In other cases, Mandara Spa takes on the costs of the operation and shares a percentage of top-line revenue only with the hotel. In some cases, the hotel and Mandara Spa share both costs and revenues and split the profits.
