= Thomas Pritzker =

American billionaire and businessman

- Born: June 6, 1950 (age 76)
- Education: Claremont McKenna College (BA); University of Chicago (JD, MBA)
- Occupation: Hotelier
- Spouse: Margot Marshall
- Children: 3
- Parent: Jay Pritzker (father)
- Family: Pritzker

Thomas Pritzker (born June 6, 1950) is an American billionaire heir and businessman. A member of the Pritzker family, he is the executive chairman and former chief executive officer (CEO) of the Pritzker Organization (TPO), which manages the various Pritzker family business assets. Pritzker is also the former executive chairman of the Hyatt Hotels Corporation.

== Early life ==
Thomas Pritzker was born on June 6, 1950 to the Pritzker family, son of Jay Pritzker (1922–99) and his wife, Marian Friend. Thomas' great grandparents in the male line were Ukrainian Jewish immigrants, Annie P. (née Cohn) and Nicholas J. Pritzker. His maternal grandfather was the Czech Jewish immigrant, athlete and judge Hugo Friend.

He received a J.D. and a M.B.A. in 1976 from the University of Chicago, and a B.A. in 1971 from Claremont Men's College.

== Career ==
Pritzker's father built the chain of Hyatt Hotels. Over the years, Thomas Pritzker held several positions with Hyatt Corporation (the private operating company) and Hyatt Hotels Corporation (the publicly traded holding company that was created when Hyatt Corporation and Hyatt International merged):

- 1977–1980: Joined Hyatt Corporation and also worked at the Pritzker & Pritzker law firm
- 1980–1999: Hyatt Corporation President
- 1999–Dec. 2006: Hyatt Corporation Chair and CEO
- August 2004–December 2006: Hyatt Hotels Corporation CEO
- August 2004–February 2026: Hyatt Hotels Corporation board member and Executive Chair

Pritzker resigned from his position as Executive Chairman on February 16, 2026, the result of his involvement with Jeffrey Epstein.

He also served as a director of Royal Caribbean Cruises until 2020 and of TransUnion until 2010. He is the founder and chairman of North America Western Asia Holdings LLC (NAWAH), an investment and advisory firm seeking to invest in Iraqi companies while advising clients looking to do business in the region.

He is the past chair of the Art Institute of Chicago and the Center for Strategic and International Studies. He is also a member of the Council on Foreign Relations and the Aspen Strategy Group. He organized the Pritzker Neuropsychiatric Disorders Research Consortium.

== Involvement with Jeffrey Epstein ==
Pritzker was in regular contact with Jeffrey Epstein in the years following Mr. Epstein’s 2008 plea deal on sex crimes charges.

He was named in a deposition filed under oath by Virginia Giuffre related to her being sexually trafficked through the Epstein network. She testified in the deposition that she once was sexually abused by Pritzker. A spokesperson for Pritzker told Reuters that Pritzker "continues to vehemently deny" the allegation.

Later, the released Epstein files showed frequent email exchanges, including one from 2018 in which he helped Epstein's partner Karyna Shuliak plan a trip to Southeast Asia, with the expressed goal of finding females for Epstein.

Pritzker was listed as a co-conspirator by Thomas Massie on the House floor in September 2026.

== Personal life ==
He is married to Margot Marshall. They have three sons.

He holds an honorary doctorate from Tsinghua University in Haidian, Beijing, China.
