= List of United States political families (P) =

The following is an alphabetical list of political families in the United States whose last name begins with P.

== The Packers ==
- Daniel Packer (1783–1838), Connecticut State Senator 1831. Uncle of Asa Packer.
  - Asa Packer (1805–1879), Pennsylvania State Representative 1841–42, Judge of Carbon County, Pennsylvania 1843–48; U.S. Representative from Pennsylvania 1853–57; candidate for Democratic nomination for President of the United States 1868; candidate for Governor of Pennsylvania 1869. Nephew of Daniel Packer.
  - Josef Marie Piollet, delegate to the Democratic National Convention 1876. Brother-in-law of Asa Packer.
    - R.A. Packer (1842–1883), delegate to the Democratic National Convention 1876. Son of Asa Packer.

== The Packwoods ==
- William H. Packwood, delegate to the Oregon Constitutional Convention 1857. Great-grandfather of Robert W. Packwood.
  - Robert W. Packwood (born 1932), Chairman of the Multnomah County, Oregon Republican Party 1960–62; Oregon State Representative 1963–68; U.S. Senator from Oregon 1969–95; delegate to the Republican National Convention 1972. Great-grandson of William H. Packwood.

== The Pages ==
- John Page (1628–1692), member of the Virginia House of Burgesses. Ancestor of John Page, Mann Page, and Thomas Nelson Page.
  - John Page (1743–1808), member of the Virginia Legislature, U.S. Representative from Virginia 1789–97, Governor of Virginia 1802–05. Descendant of John Page.
  - Mann Page (1749–1781), Delegate to the Continental Congress from Virginia 1777. Descendant of John Page.
  - Thomas Nelson Page (1853–1922), U.S. Ambassador to Italy 1913–19. Descendant of John Page.

NOTE: John Page's grandson, Mann Page I, was also son-in-law of Virginia Colony Governor Robert Carter I; Page's great-grandson, John, was also grandson-in-law of Virginia House of Burgesses member William Byrd I. Thomas Nelson Page is also a direct descendant of Continental Congressional Delegate Thomas Nelson Jr.

== The Pages of North Carolina ==
- Walter Hines Page (1855–1918), U.S. Ambassador to Great Britain 1913–18. Brother of Robert N. Page.
- Robert N. Page (1859–1933), North Carolina State Representative 1901–02, U.S. Representative from North Carolina 1903–17. Brother of Walter Hines Page.

== The Paines ==
- Elijah Paine (1757–1842), member of the Vermont Legislature, Justice of the Vermont Supreme Court 1791–93, U.S. Senator from Vermont 1795–1801, Judge of the United States District Court for the District of Vermont 1801–42. Father of Charles Paine.
  - Charles Paine (1799–1853), Vermont State Representative 1828–29, Governor of Vermont 1841–43. Son of Elijah Paine.

== The Paines and Treats ==
- Robert Treat (1622–1710), Governor of Connecticut Colony 1683–98. Great-grandfather of Robert Treat Paine.
  - Robert Treat Paine (1731–1814), Delegate to the Continental Congress from Massachusetts 1774–78, Massachusetts State Representative 1777, Attorney General of Massachusetts 1777–90, Justice of the Massachusetts Supreme Court 1790–1804. Great-grandson of Robert Treat.

== The Palmers and Haynes ==
- John Palmer (1785–1840), U.S. Representative from New York 1817–19 1837–39, District Attorney in New York 1818–32, Judge of Clinton County, New York 1832–37. Uncle of George William Palmer.
  - George William Palmer (1818–1916), U.S. Representative from New York 1857–61, delegate to the Republican National Convention 1864, U.S. Consul to Crete, New York Assemblyman 1884–85. Nephew of John Palmer.
  - William Elisha Haynes (1829–1914), U.S. Representative from Ohio 1889–93. Cousin of George William Palmer.

== The Palmers and Witherells ==
- Benjamin F.H. Witherell (1797–1867), Justice of the Peace in Michigan, Recorder of Detroit, Michigan; delegate to the Michigan Constitutional Convention 1850; Probate Court Judge in Michigan 1834–35; Prosecuting Attorney of Wayne County, Michigan 1835–39; Michigan State Senator 1840–41; candidate for Mayor of Detroit, Michigan 1842; Justice of the Michigan Supreme Court; District Court Judge of Michigan; Circuit Court Judge in Michigan 1858–66; Recorder's Court Judge in Michigan 1862–64. Uncle of Thomas W. Palmer.
  - Thomas W. Palmer (1830–1913), Michigan State Senator 1879–80, U.S. Senator from Michigan 1883–89, U.S. Minister to Spain 1889–90. Nephew of Benjamin F.H. Witherell.

== The Panettas ==
- Leon Panetta (born 1938), U.S. Representative from California 1977–1993, director of the Office of Management and Budget 1993–1994, White House Chief of Staff 1994–1997, Director of the Central Intelligence Agency 2009–2011, United States Secretary of Defense 2011–2013.
  - Jimmy Panetta (born 1969), U.S. Representative from California 2017–present. Son of Leon Panetta.

== The Pardees ==
- Jared Whitfield Pardee (1792–1867), Probate Court Judge in Connecticut, Connecticut State Representative 1830–31. Third cousin of Aaron Pardee.
- Aaron Pardee (1808–1898), Ohio State Senator 1850–53. Third cousin of Jared Whitfield Pardee.
- Henry Pardee (1796–1862), New York Assemblyman 1836–37, 1844–51. Fourth cousin of Jared Whitfield Pardee.
- Tracy Pardee (1807–1883), New York Assemblyman 1848–49. Fourth cousin of Jared Whitfield Pardee.
  - Dwight W. Pardee (1822–1893), Connecticut State Senator 1858–59, Superior Court Judge in Connecticut 1863–73, Justice of the Connecticut Supreme Court 1873–90. Son of Jared Whitfield Pardee.
  - Enoch H. Pardee (1826–1896), California Assemblyman 1871–73, Mayor of Oakland, California 1876–78. Third cousin once removed of Jared Whitfield Pardee.
  - Don Albert Pardee (1837–1919), District Court Judge in Louisiana 1868–80, delegate to the Louisiana Constitutional Convention 1879, candidate for Attorney General of Louisiana 1880, Judge of the U.S. Court of Appeals 1881–1919. Third cousin once removed of Jared Whitfield Pardee.
    - George Pardee (1857–1941), Mayor of Oakland, California 1893–95; Governor of California 1903–07; delegate to the Republican National Convention 1912. Son of Enoch H. Pardee.

== The Parfitts ==
- Harold Parfitt was Governor of the Panama Canal Zone 1975–79.
  - Karen Parfitt Hughes, daughter of Harold, is U.S. Undersecretary of State for Public Diplomacy, and has been an adviser and speechwriter for Republican Presidents since Reagan.

== The Parkers ==
- James Parker (1776–1868), New Jersey Assemblyman 1806–10 1812–13 1815–16 1818–27, Mayor of Perth Amboy, New Jersey 1815–50; Collector of Customs of Perth Amboy, New Jersey 1829–33; U.S. Representative from New Jersey 1833–37; delegate to the New Jersey Constitutional Convention 1844. Father of Cortlandt Parker.
  - Cortlandt Parker (1818–1907), delegate to the Republican National Convention 1868. Son of James Parker.
    - Richard W. Parker (1848–1923), New Jersey Assemblyman 1885–86, U.S. Representative from New Jersey 1895–1911 1914–19 1921–23. Son of Cortlandt Parker.
    - Charles Wolcott Parker (1862–1948), District Court Judge in New Jersey 1898–1903, Circuit Court Judge in New Jersey 1903–07, Justice of the New Jersey Supreme Court 1907–47. Son of Cortlandt Parker.

== The Parkers of Georgia ==
- Hampton Cling Parker, Georgia State Senator 1882–83. Grandfather of Homer C. Parker.
  - Homer C. Parker (1885–1946), Mayor of Statesboro, Georgia 1924–27; U.S. Representative from Georgia 1931–35; Comptroller General of Georgia 1936–37 1941–46. Grandson of Hampton Cling Parker.

== The Parkers of New York ==
- Barrington D. Parker (1915–1993), Judge of the United States District Court for the District of Columbia 1969–85.
  - Barrington Daniels Parker Jr. (born 1944), Judge of the United States District Court for the Southern District of New York 1994–2001, Judge of the United States Court of Appeals for the Second Circuit 2001–09. Son of Barrington D. Parker.

== The Parkers of Virginia ==
- Richard Parker (1729–1813), member of the Westmoreland County, Virginia Committee of Safety; Virginia House Delegate; Judge of the Virginia General Court; Judge of the Virginia Court of Appeals. Grandfather of Richard E. Parker.
  - Richard E. Parker (1783–1840), member of the Virginia Legislature, Virginia State Court Judge, U.S. Senator from Virginia 1836–37. Grandson of Richard Parker.

== The Parnells ==
- Kevin Parnell, candidate for U.S. Representative from Alaska 1980. Father of Sean Parnell.
  - Sean Parnell (born 1962), Alaska State Representative 1993–97, Alaska State Senator 1997–2001, Lieutenant Governor of Alaska 2006–09, candidate for the Republican nomination for U.S. Representative from Alaska 2008, Governor of Alaska 2009-present. Son of Kevin Parnell.

== The Parrans ==
- Thomas Parran Sr. (1860–1955), Maryland House Delegate 1884–88, delegate to the Republic National Convention 1888 1904 1908, Maryland State Senator 1892–94, Clerk of Maryland Court of Appeals 1901–07, U.S. Representative from Maryland 1911–13. Father of Thomas Parran Jr.
  - Thomas Parran Jr. (1892–1968), Surgeon General of the United States 1936–48. Son of Thomas Parran Sr.

== The Parris ==
- Albion K. Parris (1788–1857), Prosecutor of Oxford County, Maine; Maine State Representative 1813–14; Maine State Senator 1814–16; U.S. Representative from Massachusetts 1815–18; Judge of Cumberland County, Maine 1818–22; Governor of Maine 1822–27; U.S. Senator from Maine 1827–28; Mayor of Portland, Maine 1852; candidate for Governor of Maine 1854. Cousin of Virgil D. Parris.
- Virgil D. Parris (1807–1874), Maine State Representative 1832–37, U.S. Representative from Maine 1838–41, Maine State Senator 1842–43, U.S. Marshal of Maine 1844–48, delegate to the Democratic National Convention 1852 1872. Cousin of Albion K. Parris.

== The Patersons ==
- Basil A. Paterson (1926–2014), delegate to the 1972 Democratic National Convention, New York State Senator 1966–70, New York Secretary of State 1979–83 under Hugh Carey. Deputy Mayor of New York City 1978–79 under Ed Koch, Candidate for Lieutenant Governor of New York in 1970. Father of David Paterson.
  - David Paterson (born 1954), delegate to the 2004 Democratic National Convention, Lieutenant Governor of New York 2007–08, Governor of New York 2008–10. New York State Senate 1985–2006, Minority Leader of the State Senate 2003–2006, Candidate for New York City Public Advocate in 1993. Chairman of New York State Democratic Committee 2014–2015. Son of Basil Paterson.

== The Patmans ==
- Wright Patman (1893–1976), Texas State Representative 1921–24, District Attorney in Texas 1924–29, U.S. Representative from Texas 1929–76. Father of William Patman.
  - William Patman (1927–2008), Texas State Senator 1961–80, U.S. Representative from Texas 1981–85. Son of Wright Patman.

== The Pattersons ==
- Thomas Patterson (1764–1856), U.S. Representative from Pennsylvania 1817–25. Brother of John Patterson.
- John Patterson (1771–1848), Mayor of St. Clairsville, Ohio 1807–08; Ohio State Representative 1807–08; Ohio State Senator 1815–18; Judge of the Belmont County, Ohio Court of Common Pleas 1810–15; U.S. Representative from Ohio 1823–25. Brother of Thomas Patterson.

== The Pattersons of Hempstead and Uniondale ==
- Thomas Patterson (1861–1901), sponsor of movement to create Nassau County, first Clerk of Nassau County, New York 1899–1901. Son of John Patterson, brother of Archibald G. Patterson and John Edward Patterson, Uncle of A. Holly Patterson.
- John Edward Patterson (1865-?), Clerk of Hempstead Board of Assessors, Republican Leader of Hempstead Village in the 1910s. Son of John Patterson, brother of Thomas Patterson and Archibald G. Patterson, uncle of A. Holly Patterson.
- Archibald G. Patterson (1870–1958), Hempstead Town Superintendent of Highways, Republican Leader of Hempstead Village in 1910s. Son of John Patterson, brother of Thomas Patterson and J. Edward Patterson, father of A. Holly Patterson
  - Archibald Holly Patterson (1898–1980), Hempstead Village Attorney 1928–1934, Counsel to Special Districts, Town of Hempstead Presiding Officer 1935–1953, County Executive of Nassau County, New York 1953–1961, Chairman of Nassau County Republican Committee 1959–1961, Delegate to Republican National Convention 1956, 1960, Presidential Elector for New York 1972, board chairman of Nassau Community College, president of Long Island State Park and Recreation Commission, chairman of Jones Beach State Parkway Authority, chairman of Hempstead National Bank 1961–1968, chairman of Huntington National Bank 1968-1970s.
  - Bertram M. Patterson. Town of Hempstead Superintendent of Highways 1933-?. Brother of A. Holly Patterson, son of Archibald G. Patterson.

== The Pattersons of New York ==
- Robert P. Patterson (1891–1952), U.S. District Court Judge in New York 1930–39, Judge of the U.S. Court of Appeals 1939–40, U.S. Secretary of War 1945–47. Father of Robert P. Patterson Jr.
  - Robert P. Patterson Jr. (1923–2015), U.S. District Court Judge in New York. Son of Robert P. Patterson.

== The Pattersons of Tennessee ==
- Josiah Patterson (1837–1904), member of the Tennessee Legislature, U.S. Representative from Tennessee 1891–97. Father of Malcolm R. Patterson.
  - Malcolm R. Patterson (1861–1935), U.S. Representative from Tennessee 1901–06, Governor of Tennessee 1907–11, Tennessee State Court Judge. Son of Josiah Patterson.

== The Pattersons and Seymours ==
- David L. Seymour (1803–1867), New York Assemblyman 1836, District Attorney of Rensselaer County, New York 1839–42; U.S. Representative from New York 1843–45 1851–53; delegate to the New York Constitutional Convention 1867. Father-in-law of Charles E. Patterson.
  - Charles E. Patterson, New York Assemblyman 1881–82. Son-in-law of David L. Seymour.

== The Pattons ==
- John Patton (1823–1897), delegate to the Whig Party National Convention 1852 1860, U.S. Representative from Pennsylvania 1861–63 1887–89. Father of John Patton Jr. and Charles Emory Patton.
  - John Patton Jr. (1850–1907), U.S. Senator from Michigan 1894–95. Son of John Patton.
  - Charles Emory Patton (1859–1937), member of the Williamsport, Pennsylvania School Board; Williamsport, Pennsylvania Councilman; U.S. Representative from Pennsylvania 1911–15. Son of John Patton.
  - William Irvin Swoope (1862–1930), District Attorney of Clearfield County, Pennsylvania 1901–07; delegate to the Republican National Convention 1916; U.S. Representative from Pennsylvania 1923–27. Nephew of John Patton.

== The Pattons and Wilsons ==
- Benjamin Davis Wilson (1811–1878), Mayor of Los Angeles, California 1851–52; California State Senator. Father-in-law of George Smith Patton.
  - George Smith Patton (1856–1927), District Attorney of Los Angeles County, California 1884–86; delegate to the Democratic National Convention 1892; candidate for U.S. Representative from California 1894; candidate for U.S. Senate from California 1916. Son-in-law of Benjamin Davis Wilson.

== The Pauls ==
- Ron Paul (born 1935), U.S. Representative from Texas 1976–77, 1979–85 and 1997–2013; Libertarian Party Presidential candidate in 1988 and candidate for the Republican Presidential nomination in 2008 and 2012. Father of Rand Paul.
  - Rand Paul (born 1963), U.S. Senator from Kentucky, 2011–present. Candidate for the Republican presidential nomination in 2016. Son of Ron Paul.

NOTE: The Pauls represent the first time in United States history when a father-son team simultaneously served in the House of Representatives and Senate, respectively.

== The Pauls of Virginia ==
- John Paul (1839–1901), member of the Virginia Legislature, U.S. Representative from Virginia 1881–83, Judge of U.S. District Court in Virginia 1883–1901. Father of John Paul Jr.
  - John Paul Jr. (1883–1964), Virginia State Senator 1911–15, 1919–22, delegate to the Republican National Convention 1916 1924, candidate for U.S. Representative from Virginia 1920, U.S. Representative from Virginia 1922–23, Judge of U.S. District Court 1932–59. Son of John Paul.

== The Pauldings ==
- William Paulding Jr. (1770–1854), U.S. Representative from New York 1811–13, delegate to the New York Constitutional Convention 1821, Mayor of New York City 1824–26. Father of James K. Paulding.
  - James K. Paulding (1778–1860), U.S. Secretary of the Navy 1838–41. Son of William Paulding Jr.

NOTE: James K. Paulding was also brother-in-law of U.S. Representative William Irving.

== The Paynes ==
- Donald M. Payne (1934–2012), candidate for Democratic nomination for U.S. Representative from New Jersey 1980 1986, U.S. Representative from New Jersey 1989–2012. Brother of William D. Payne.
- William D. Payne, New Jersey Assemblyman 1998–2008. Brother of Donald M. Payne.
  - Donald Payne Jr. (born 1958), Newark, New Jersey Councilman, U.S. Representative from New Jersey 2012–present. Son of Donald M. Payne.
  - Craig A. Stanley (born 1955), New Jersey Assemblyman 1996–2008. Nephew of Donald M. Payne and William D. Payne.

== The Pearces ==
- James A. Pearce (1805–1862), Maryland House Delegate 1831–35, U.S. Representative from Maryland 1835–39 1841–43, U.S. Senator from Maryland 1843–62. Father of J. Alfred Pearce Jr.
  - J. Alfred Pearce Jr. (1840–1920), delegate to the Democratic National Convention 1876. Son of James A. Pearce.

== The Peays ==
- Austin Peay (1876–1927), Tennessee State Representative 1901–05, Chairman of the Tennessee Democratic Party 1905, Governor of Tennessee 1923–27, delegate to the Democratic National Convention 1924. Father of Austin Peay V.
  - Austin Peay, V (1901–1949), delegate to the Democratic National Convention 1928, Tennessee State Representative 1931–35. Son of Austin Peay.

== The Pecks ==
- John Weld Peck (1874–1937), Judge of the United States District Court for the Southern District of Ohio 1919–23.
  - John Weld Peck II (1913–1993), Associate Justice of the Ohio Supreme Court 1959–60, Judge of the United States District Court for the Southern District of Ohio 1961–66, Judge of the United States Court of Appeals for the Sixth Circuit 1966–78. Nephew of John Weld Peck.

== The Peckhams ==
- Rufus W. Peckham (1809–1873), U.S. Representative from New York; District Attorney of Albany, New York; Justice of the New York Supreme Court and New York Court of Appeals.
  - Rufus W. Peckham (1838–1909), Albany District Attorney; Justice of New York Supreme Court and New York Court of Appeals; Associate Justice of the Supreme Court of the United States, 1895–1909; son of Rufus W.
  - Wheeler Hazard Peckham (1833–1905), lawyer in New York who prosecuted Boss Tweed; appointed to the U.S. Supreme Court by Grover Cleveland but not confirmed; son of Rufus W. and brother of Rufus Wheeler.

== The Pences ==
- Greg Pence (born 1956), U.S. Representative from Indiana, 2019–2025. Brother of Mike Pence.
- Mike Pence (born 1959), U.S. Representative from Indiana 2001–2013, Governor of Indiana 2013–2017, Vice President of the United States 2017–2021. Brother of Greg Pence.
- Karen Pence (born 1957), First Lady of Indiana, Second Lady of the United States. Wife of Mike Pence.
  - Charlotte Pence Bond (born 1993), First Daughter of Indiana, Second Daughter of the United States. Daughter of Mike Pence and Karen Pence.

== The Peltiers ==
- Harvey Peltier Sr. (1899–1977), member of the Louisiana House of Representatives 1924–29, Louisiana state senator 1930–40, campaign manager of Huey P. Long Sr.
  - Harvey Peltier Jr. (1923–1980), member of the Louisiana State Senate 1964–76 Son of Harvey Peltier Sr.

== The Pendletons, Penns, Gaines, and Taylors ==
- Edmund Pendleton (1721–1803), Justice of the Peace in Virginia Colony 1751, member of the Virginia Colony House of Burgesses 1752–74, member of the Virginia Colony Committee of Correspondence 1773, Delegate to the Continental Congress from Virginia 1774–75, President of the Virginia Committee of Safety 1775, President of the Virginia Constitutional Convention 1775 1776, Virginia House of Delegates 1776–77, Judge of the General Court of Chancery in Virginia 1777, Presiding Judge of the Court of Appeals in Virginia 1779. Uncle of John Penn, John Taylor, and Nathaniel Pendleton.
  - John Penn (1741–1788), Delegate to the Continental Congress from North Carolina 1775–80, Receiver of Taxes of North Carolina 1784. Nephew of Edmund Pendleton.
  - John Taylor (1753–1824), Virginia House Delegate 1779–81 1783–85 1796–1800, U.S. Senator from Virginia 1792–94 1803 1822–24. Nephew of Edmund Pendleton.
  - Nathaniel Pendleton (1756–1821), District Court Judge in Georgia, Federal Judge in Georgia 1789–96, Delegate to the Continental Congress from Georgia 1789. Nephew of Edmund Pendleton.
    - Henry Gaines Johnson (1787–1857), South Carolina State Senator 1840–44. Great-grandnephew of Edmund Pendleton.
  - Nathaniel Pendleton, nephew of Edmund Pendleton, Attorney General of Georgia in 1785–86, Judge for the U.S. District of Georgia 1789–96, second in the Alexander Hamilton - Aaron Burr duel. Father of Nathanael G.
    - Nathanael G. Pendleton (1793–1861), Ohio State Senator 1825–29, U.S. Representative from Ohio 1841–43. Father of George H. Pendleton.
      - George H. Pendleton (1825–1889), Ohio State Senator 1854–56, candidate for U.S. Representative from Ohio 1854, U.S. Representative from Ohio 1857–69, candidate for Vice President of the United States 1864, candidate for Governor of Ohio 1869, U.S. Senator from Ohio 1879–85, U.S. Ambassador to Germany 1885–89. Son of Nathanael Pendleton. (George H. Pendleton was also son-in-law of U.S. District Attorney Francis Scott Key)
  - James Gaines (1743-c. 1830), North Carolina State Representative, Delegate to the Hillsborough convention of 1788, nephew of Edmund Pendelton. <Historic Sullivan: Sullivan County, Tennessee> Father of George and Edmund Gaines, grandfather of Francis Strother Lyon.
    - George Strother Gaines, Alabama state senator (1825–1827), brother of
    - Maj. Gen. Edmund Pendleton Gaines, (1777–1849).<Edmund Pendleton Gaines>, husband of Myra Clark Gaines (1804–1885) <EDLA 200th Anniversary - Myra Clark Gaines Documents>

== The Pendletons and Treutlens ==
- John A. Treutlen (1730–1782), Governor of Georgia 1777–78. Great-granduncle by marriage of Charles Rittenhouse Pendleton.
  - Charles Rittenhouse Pendleton, member of the Georgia Legislature 1882–83. Great-granduncle by marriage of John A Treutlen.

== The Penningtons ==
- William Sandford Pennington (1757–1826), U.S. Attorney of New Jersey 1803–04, Governor of New Jersey 1813–15, Judge of the United States District Court for the District of New Jersey 1815–26. Father of William Pennington.
  - William Pennington (1796–1862), New Jersey Assemblyman 1828, Governor of New Jersey 1837–43, U.S. Representative from New Jersey 1859–61, Speaker of the U.S. House of Representatives 1860–61. Son of William Sandford Pennington.
    - Alexander C. M. Pennington (1810–1867), New Jersey Assemblyman 1837–38, Newark, New Jersey Alderman 1837–40; U.S. Representative from New Jersey 1853–57. Grandnephew of William Sandford Pennington.

== The Pennybackers and Samuels ==
- Isaac S. Pennybacker (1805–1847), U.S. Representative from Virginia 1837–39, Judge of U.S. District Court in Virginia 1839–45, U.S. Senator from Virginia 1845–47. Brother of Joel Pennybacker.
- Joel Pennybacker, Virginia State Senator. Brother of Isaac S. Pennybacker.
- Green Berry Samuels (1806–1859), U.S. Representative from Virginia 1839–41, delegate to the Virginia Constitutional Convention 1850 1851, Judge of the Virginia Circuit Court, Judge of the Virginia Court of Appeals. Cousin of Isaac S. Pennybacker.
  - John D. Pennybacker, Virginia State Senator. Son of Isaac S. Pennybacker.
  - Benjamin Pennybacker Douglass, Indiana State Representative 1857, Common Pleas Court Judge in Indiana 1864. Nephew of Isaac S. Pennybacker and Joel Pennybacker.
  - Benjamin M. Samuels, candidate for Governor of Iowa 1857 1861, delegate to the Democratic National Convention 1860. Nephew of Green Berry Samuels.
  - Samuel W. Pennypacker (1843–1916), Governor of Pennsylvania 1903–07, delegate to the Republican National Convention 1904. Third cousin once removed of Isaac S. Pennybacker and Green Berry Samuels.
    - William B. Umstead (1895–1954), U.S. Representative from North Carolina 1933–39, Chairman of the North Carolina Democratic Party 1945, U.S. Senator from North Carolina 1946–48, delegate to the Democratic National Convention 1948, Governor of North Carolina 1953–54. Distant cousin of Isaac S. Pennybacker, Green Berry Samuels, Benjamin M. Samuels, and Samuel W. Pennypacker.

NOTE: Samuel W. Pennypacker was also great-grandson of U.S. Representative Isaac Anderson and great-great-grandson of Pennsylvania State Representative Patrick Anderson. William B. Umstead was also son of North Carolina legislator John W. Umstead.

== The Perdues ==
- Sonny Perdue (born 1946), Member of Georgia Senate 1991–2001, Governor of Georgia 2003–11, United States Secretary of Agriculture 2017–2021.
- David Perdue (born 1949), United States Senator from Georgia 2015–2021. First cousin of Sonny Perdue.

== The Pereas ==
- Francisco Perea (1830–1913), New Mexico Territory Councilman 1858 1866 1884, delegate to the Republican National Convention 1864, U.S. Congressional Delegate from New Mexico Territory 1863–65, Postmaster of Jemez Springs, New Mexico 1894–1905. Cousin of Pedro Perea.
- Pedro Perea (1852–1906), New Mexico Territory Councilman 1889 1891 1895, delegate to the Republican National Convention 1896, U.S. Congressional Delegate from New Mexico Territory 1899–1901. Cousin of Francisco Perea.

== The Perkins ==
- Carl D. Perkins (1912–1984), Kentucky State Representative 1940, Attorney of Knott County, Kentucky; U.S. Representative from Kentucky 1949–84. Father of Carl C. Perkins.
  - Carl C. Perkins (born 1954), Kentucky State Representative 1981–84, U.S. Representative from Kentucky 1985–93. Son of Carl D. Perkins.

== The Pershings and Warrens ==
- Francis E. Warren (1844–1929), Wyoming Territory Senator 1873–74 1884–85, Treasurer of Wyoming Territory 1876 1879 1882 1884, Mayor of Cheyenne, Wyoming 1885; Governor of Wyoming Territory 1885–86 1889–90; Governor of Wyoming 1890; U.S. Senator from Wyoming 1890–93 1895–1929. Father-in-law of John J. Pershing.
  - John J. Pershing (1860–1948), candidate for the Republican nomination for President of the United States 1920. Son-in-law of Francis E. Warren.

== The Perrys ==
- Benjamin Franklin Perry (1805–1886), delegate to the Democratic National Convention 1860 1876, Governor of South Carolina 1865. Father of William H. Perry.
  - William H. Perry (1839–1902), member of the South Carolina Legislature, U.S. Representative from South Carolina 1885–91. Son of Benjamin Franklin Perry.

== The Persons ==
- Rollin H. Person (1850–1917), Michigan Circuit Court Judge 1891–99, candidate for Justice of the Michigan Supreme Court 1912 1913, Justice of the Michigan Supreme Court 1915–16. Husband of Ida M. Person.
- Ida M. Person, Michigan Democratic Committeewoman 1919. Wife of Rollin H. Person.
  - Seymour H. Person (1879–1957), Michigan State Representative 1915–21, Michigan State Senator 1927–31, U.S. Representative from Michigan 1931–33, candidate for U.S. Representative from Michigan 1942. Nephew of Rollin H. Person and nephew by marriage of Ida M. Person.

== The Peters ==
- George Peter (1779–1861), U.S. Representative from Maryland 1816–19 1825–27, Maryland House Delegate 1819–23. Father of George Peter.
  - George Peter (1823–1893), Maryland State Senator 1879–82 1887–90. Son of George Peter.
    - Arthur Peter, delegate to the Democratic National Convention 1904 1912. Son of George Peter.

== The Peters of Maine ==
- John A. Peters (1822–1904), Maine State Senator 1862–63, Maine State Representative 1864, Attorney General of Maine 1864–66, U.S. Representative from Maine 1867–73, Judge of the Maine Supreme Court 1873–83. Uncle of John A. Peters.
  - John A. Peters (1864–1953), Judge of Ellsworth, Maine Municipal Court 1896–1908; Maine State Representative 1909 1911 1913; U.S. Representative from Maine 1913–22; Judge of U.S. District Court of Maine 1922–47; delegate to the Republican National Convention 1916. Nephew of John A. Peters.

== The Pettits ==
- John U. Pettit (1820–1881), Indiana State Representative 1844–45 1865, Circuit Court Judge in Indiana 1853–54 1873–79, U.S. Representative from Indiana 1855–61. Father of Henry Corbin Pettit.
  - Henry Corbin Pettit (1863–1913), Mayor of Wabash, Indiana 1888–90; Indiana State Representative 1895–97. Son of John U. Pettit.

== The Pettitses of California ==
- Jerry Pettis (1916–1975), U.S. Representative from California 1967–1975.
- Shirley Neil Pettis (1924–2016), U.S. Representative from California 1975–1979. Wife of Jerry Pettis.

== The Pettus ==
- John J. Pettus (1813–1867), Governor of Mississippi 1854 1859–63. Brother of Edmund Pettus.
- Edmund W. Pettus (1821–1907), Circuit Court Judge in Alabama 1855–58, delegate to the Democratic National Convention 1876 1892, U.S. Senator from Alabama 1897–1907. Brother of John J. Pettus.

== The Peytons ==
- Balie Peyton (1803–1878), U.S. Representative from Tennessee 1833–37, U.S. Attorney in Louisiana 1841–45, U.S. Minister to Chile 1849–53, Prosecuting Attorney of San Francisco, California 1853–59; candidate for U.S. Representative from Tennessee 1866; Tennessee State Senator 1869–71. Brother of Joseph Hopkins Peyton.
- Joseph Hopkins Peyton (1808–1845), Tennessee State Senator 1840, U.S. Representative from Tennessee 1843–45. Brother of Balie Peyton.

== The Phelans ==
- James Phelan Sr. (1821–1873), Mississippi State Senator 1860, Confederate States Senator from Mississippi 1862–64. Father of James Phelan Jr..
  - James Phelan Jr. (1856–1891), U.S. Representative from Tennessee 1887–91. Son of James Phelan Sr.

== The Phelps ==
- Elisha Phelps (1779–1847), Connecticut State Representative 1807 1812 1814–18 1821 1829 1835, U.S. Representative from Connecticut 1819–21 1825–29, Connecticut State Senator 1822–24, Connecticut Comptroller 1831–37. Father of John S. Phelps.
  - John S. Phelps (1814–1886), Missouri State Representative 1840, U.S. Representative from Missouri 1845–63, Governor of Missouri 1877–81. Son of Elisha Phelps.

== The Phelps of Connecticut and Pennsylvania ==
- Lancelot Phelps (1784–1866), Connecticut State Representative 1817 1819–21 1824 1827–28 1830, U.S. Representative from Connecticut 1835–39. Father of James Phelps.
  - James Phelps (1822–1900), Connecticut State Representative 1853–54 1856, Connecticut State Senator 1858–59, Judge of the Connecticut Superior Court 1863–73 1885–92, Justice of the Connecticut Supreme Court 1873–75, U.S. Representative from Connecticut 1875–83. Son of Lancelot Phelps.
    - Judson B. Phelps (1836–1906), Pennsylvania State Representative 1897–98. Third cousin twice removed of Lancelot Phelps.

== The Phelps of New Jersey ==
- William Walter Phelps (1839–1894), U.S. Representative from New Jersey 1873–75 1883–89, U.S. Minister to Austria-Hungary 1881–82, U.S. Minister to Germany 1889–93, Judge of the New Jersey Court of Errors and Appeals 1893–94. Father of Sheffield Phelps.
  - Sheffield Phelps (1864–1902), delegate to the Republican National Convention 1900. Son of William W. Phelps.
    - Phelps Phelps (1897–1981), New York Assemblyman 1924–28 1937–38, delegate to the Republican National Convention 1932, delegate to the Democratic National Convention 1936 1956 1960, New York State Senator 1939–42, Governor of American Samoa 1951–52, U.S. Ambassador to Dominican Republic 1952–53, delegate to the New Jersey Constitutional Convention 1966. Grandson of William W. Phelps.

NOTE: Sheffield Phelps was also son-in-law of Delaware Governor Preston Lea.

== The Phelps of Vermont ==
- Samuel S. Phelps (1793–1855), Vermont State Representative 1821–32, Justice of the Vermont Supreme Court 1832–38, U.S. Senator from Vermont 1839–51 1853–54. Father of Edward John Phelps.
  - Edward John Phelps (1822–1900), U.S. Minister to Great Britain 1885–89. Son of Samuel S. Phelps.

== The Philipps ==
- Emanuel L. Philipp (1861–1925), Governor of Wisconsin 1915–21. Father of Cyrus L. Philipp.
  - Cyrus L. Philipp, Chairman of the Republican Party of Wisconsin 1934–38, Republican National Committeeman 1944–52, Milwaukee County, Wisconsin Republican Committeeman. Son of Emanuel L. Philipp.

== The Phillips (New England) ==
- Samuel Phillips Jr. (1752–1802), member of the Massachusetts Provincial Congress 1775–80, fifth Lieutenant Governor of Massachusetts, President of the Massachusetts Senate 1785–1802.
- William Phillips Jr. (1750–1827), tenth Lieutenant Governor of Massachusetts 1812–23.
  - Samuel H. Walley (1805–1877), grandson of William Phillips Jr., Member of the Massachusetts House of Representatives 1836 and 1840–46, serving as Speaker of the House 1844–46. Whig Representative to the Thirty-third Congress 1853–55.
- John Phillips (1770–1823), Mayor of Boston, Massachusetts 1822–23.
- Stephen C. Phillips (1801–1857), National Republican Representative to the Twenty-third Congress and the Twenty-fourth Congress, Whig Representative to the Twenty-fifth Congress. Mayor of Salem, Massachusetts 1838–42.
- William Phillips (1878–1868), U.S. Minister to the Netherlands 1920–22, U.S. Minister to Luxembourg 1920–22 1924–27, Minister to Canada 1927–29, Ambassador to Belgium 1924–27, Ambassador to Italy 1936–41. Father of Christopher H. Phillips.
  - Christopher H. Phillips (1920–2008), Massachusetts State Senator 1948–53, delegate to the 1952 and 1960 Republican National Conventions, Ambassador to Brunei 1989–91. Son of William Phillips.

NOTE: William Phillips was also second cousin by marriage of U.S. President Franklin D. Roosevelt.

== The Phipps and Scotts ==
- W. Kerr Scott (1896–1958), North Carolina Commissioner of Agriculture, Governor of North Carolina 1949–53, U.S. Senator from North Carolina 1954–58. Father of Robert W. Scott.
  - Robert W. Scott (1929–2009), Lieutenant Governor of North Carolina 1965–69, Governor of North Carolina 1969–73. Son of W. Kerr Scott.
    - Meg Scott Phipps, North Carolina Commissioner of Agriculture 2001–03. Daughter of Robert W. Scott.

== The Phips ==
- Sir William Phips (1651–1695), Governor of Province of Massachusetts Bay 1692–94. Uncle and adoptive father of Spencer Phips.
  - Spencer Phips (1685–1757), acting Governor of province of Massachusetts Bay 1749–53 1756–57. Nephew and adopted son of William Phips.

== The Pickerings (Massachusetts) ==
- Timothy Pickering (1745–1829), United States Postmaster General (1791–1795), United States Secretary of War (1795), United States Secretary of State (1795–1800), member of the United States Senate (1803–1811), and member of the United States House of Representatives (1813–1817).
  - John Pickering (1777–1846), member of the Massachusetts House of Representatives (1812, 1827), Massachusetts Senate (1815), Massachusetts Governor's Council (1818), and district attorney of Essex County, Massachusetts (1814–1824). Son of Timothy Pickering.
    - Henry White Pickering (1811–1898), member of the Roxbury and Boston commons councils. Son of John Pickering.
      - Susan Walker Fitzgerald (1871–1943), member of the Massachusetts House of Representatives (1924–1925). One of the first two women elected to the Massachusetts House of Representatives. Granddaughter of Henry White Pickering.

== The Pickerings (Mississippi) ==
- Charles W. Pickering (born 1937), Judge of the United States District Court for the Southern District of Mississippi 1990–2004, Judge of U.S. Court of Appeals 2004. Father of Charles W. Pickering Jr.
  - Charles W. Pickering Jr. (born 1963), U.S. Representative from Mississippi 1997–2009. Son of Charles W. Pickering.
  - Stacey Pickering (born 1968), Mississippi State Senator 2004–08, Auditor of Mississippi 2008–18. Nephew of Charles W. Pickering.

== The Picketts ==
- John Samuel Pickett Sr. (born 1882), judge for the Louisiana 11th Judicial District from Many, retired in 1952 at the age of seventy, then appointed by the Louisiana Supreme Court as judge of the 4th, 30th, and 31st judicial district and the Louisiana First Circuit Court of Appeals.
  - John S. Pickett Jr. (1920–2014), Louisiana state representative from Sabine Parish 1968 to 1972, Louisiana 11th Judicial District Court judge 1972–90, son of John Samuel Pickett Sr., and father of Elizabeth Ann Pickett

== The Pierces ==
- Benjamin Pierce (1757–1839), member of the New Hampshire state legislature 1789–1802, Sheriff of Hillsborough County, New Hampshire 1809–12; 1818–27, Governor of New Hampshire 1827–28 1829–30. Father of Franklin Pierce.
  - Franklin Pierce (1804–1869), New Hampshire State Representative 1829–33, U.S. Representative from New Hampshire 1833–37, U.S. Senator from New Hampshire 1837–42, President of the United States 1853–57. Son of Benjamin Pierce. Franklin Pierce was also cousin by marriage of U.S. Senator David Meriwether.

== The Piersons ==
- Tommie Pierson (born 1946), Missouri State Representative 2011–2017, candidate for Lieutenant Governor of Missouri 2016. Father of Tommie Pierson Jr.
  - Tommie Pierson Jr. (born 1973/74), Missouri State Representative 2017–present. Son of Tommie Pierson.

== The Pillsburys ==
- John Pillsbury, New Hampshire State Representative. Father of John S. Pillsbury.
  - John S. Pillsbury (1827–1901), Minnesota State Senator 1864–68 1871 1873–75, Governor of Minnesota 1876–82. Son of John Pillsbury.

== The Pinckneys ==
- Charles Pinckney, Attorney General of South Carolina Colony 1773, South Carolina Colony Assemblyman, Chief Justice of South Carolina Colony 1752–53. Father of Charles Cotesworth Pinckney and Thomas Pinckney.
  - Charles Cotesworth Pinckney (1746–1825), South Carolina State Senator 1779–1804, U.S. Minister to France 1796–97, candidate for Vice President of the United States 1800, candidate for President of the United States 1804 1808. Son of Charles Pinckney.
  - Thomas Pinckney (1750–1828), Governor of South Carolina 1787–89, South Carolina State Representative 1791, U.S. Minister to Great Britain 1792–96, U.S. Representative from South Carolina 1797–1801. Son of Charles Pinckney.
  - Charles Pinckney (1731–1784), member of the South Carolina Provincial Congress. Nephew of Charles Pinckney.
    - Charles Cotesworth Pinckney (1789–1865), Lt. Governor of South Carolina 1832–34. Son of Thomas Pinckney
    - William Lowndes (1782–1822), South Carolina State Representative 1806, U.S. Representative from South Carolina 1811–22. Son-in-law of Thomas Pinckney
    - Charles Pinckney (1757–1824), Delegate to the Continental Congress from South Carolina 1785–87, Governor of South Carolina 1789–92 1796–98 1806–08, U.S. Senator from South Carolina 1798–1801, U.S. Minister to Spain 1801–04, U.S. Representative from South Carolina 1819–21. Son of Charles Pinckney.
      - Henry L. Pinckney (1794–1863), South Carolina State Representative 1816–32, Intendant of Charleston, South Carolina 1830–32; U.S. Representative from South Carolina 1833–37; Mayor of Charleston, South Carolina 1837–40; Collector of Port of Charleston, South Carolina 1841–42. Son of Charles Pinckney.
      - Robert Young Hayne (1791–1839), South Carolina State Representative 1814–18, Attorney General of South Carolina 1818–22, U.S. Senator from South Carolina 1823–32, Governor of South Carolina 1832–34, Mayor of Charleston, South Carolina 1835–37. Son-in-law of Charles Pinckney.

NOTE: Charles Pinckney was also son-in-law of Continental Congressional Delegate Henry Laurens. Robert Young Hayne was also brother of U.S. Senator Arthur Peronneau Hayne. Charles Cotesworth Pinckney was also son-in-law of Continental Congressional Delegate Henry Middleton. William Lowndes was also son of South Carolina Governor Rawlins Lowndes and brother of congressman Thomas Lowndes.

== The Pingrees of Vermont and Michigan ==
- Samuel E. Pingree (1832–1922), delegate to the 1868 Republican National Convention, State Attorney of Windsor County, Vermont 1868–69; Lieutenant Governor of Vermont 1882–84; Governor of Vermont 1884–86. Relative of Hazen S. Pingree.
- Hazen S. Pingree (1840–1901), Mayor of Detroit, Michigan 1890–97; Governor of Michigan 1897–1900. Relative of Samuel E. Pingree.

== The Pingrees of Maine ==
- Chellie Pingree (born 1955), Maine Senate Majority Leader 1996–2000, President of Common Cause, 2002 nominee for Senate in Maine, Representative from Maine since 2009. Mother of Hannah Pingree.
  - Hannah Pingree (born 1976), Maine House of Representatives Majority Leader. Speaker of the Maine House of Representatives, Daughter of Chellie Pingree.

== The Pinkneys and Whytes ==
- William Pinkney (1764–1822), delegate to the Maryland Constitutional Convention 1788, Maryland House Delegate 1788–92 1795, U.S. Representative from Maryland 1791 1815–16, Maryland Executive Councilman 1792–95, Mayor of Annapolis, Maryland 1795–1800; Attorney General of Maryland 1805–06; U.S. Minister to Great Britain 1806–11; Maryland State Senator 1811; Attorney General of the United States 1811–14; U.S. Minister to Russia 1816–18; U.S. Senator from Maryland 1819–22. Grandfather of William Pinkney Whyte.
  - William Pinkney Whyte (1824–1908), Maryland House Delegate 1847–49, candidate for U.S. Representative from Maryland 1850 1857, Comptroller of Maryland 1853–55, U.S. Senator from Maryland 1868–69 1875–81 1906–08, Governor of Maryland 1872–74, Mayor of Baltimore, Maryland 1881–83; Attorney General of Maryland 1887–91; Solicitor of Baltimore, Maryland 1900–03. Grandson of William Pinkney.

== The Pittmans ==
- Key Pittman (1872–1940), candidate for U.S. Senate from Nevada 1910, U.S. Senator from Nevada 1913–40. Brother of Vail M. Pittman.
- Vail M. Pittman (1880–1964), Lieutenant Governor of Nevada 1943–45, Governor of Nevada 1945–51, candidate for Democratic nomination for U.S. Senate from Nevada 1944. Brother of Key Pittman.

== The Plaisteds ==
- Harris Plaisted (1828–1898), Maine State Representative 1867, delegate to the 1868 Republican National Convention, Attorney General of Maine 1873–75, U.S. Representative from Maine 1875–77, Governor of Maine 1881–83. Father of Frederick W. Plaisted.
  - Frederick W. Plaisted (1865–1943), candidate for U.S. Representative from Maine 1897 1898, Mayor of Augusta, Maine 1906–08 1910; Governor of Maine 1911–13. Son of Harris Plaisted.

== The Platts of New York ==
- Thomas C. Platt (1833–1910), United States Senator from New York March 4, 1881 – May 16, 1881 and March 4, 1897 – March 3, 1909, Member of the United States House of Representatives New York's 27th District March 4, 1873 – March 3, 1875, Member of United States House of Representatives New York's 28th District March 4, 1875 – March 3, 1877, Clerk of Tioga County, New York 1859–1861, Republican boss of New York, steered passage of Greater New York Act. Great-grandfather of Thomas Collier Platt Jr.
  - Thomas Collier Platt Jr. (1925–2017), Senior United States Federal Judge for United States District Court for the Eastern District of New York 2001–present, Assistant U.S. Attorney of the Eastern District of New York 1953–1956, Attorney for Village of Laurel Hollow, New York 1958–1974, Acting police justice in Village of Lloyd Harbor, New York 1958–1963, Judge of the United States District Court for the Eastern District of New York 1974–2001, Chief Judge of the United States District Court for the Eastern District of New York 1988–1995. Great-grandson of Thomas C. Platt.

== The Platts of Plattsburg ==
- Zephaniah Platt (1735–1807), New York Colony Congressman 1775–77, New York State Senator 1777–83, Delegate to the Confederation Congress from New York 1785–86, Judge in Dutchess County, New York 1781–95; delegate to the New York Constitutional Convention 1788. Father of Jonas Platt.
  - Jonas Platt (1769–1834), Clerk of Herkimer County, New York 1791–95; New York Assemblyman 1796; Clerk of Oneida County, New York 1798–1802; U.S. Representative from New York 1799–1801; candidate for Governor of New York 1810; New York State Senator 1810–13; Justice of the New York Supreme Court 1914–21; delegate to the New York Constitutional Convention 1921. Son of Zephaniah Platt.
  - Charles Z. Platt (born 1773) New York State Assembly 1807, New York State Treasurer 1813–15. Son of Zephaniah Platt.
  - Zephaniah Platt (1796–1871) Michigan Attorney General 1841–43. Judge of the 2nd Circuit Court of South Carolina 1868–71. Son of Jonas Platt.
    - Moss K. Platt (1809–1876), New York State Senator 1866–67, New York Prison Inspector 1874–76, grandson of Zephaniah Platt.

== The Pleasants ==
- James Pleasants (1769–1836), Clerk and Member of the Virginia House of Delegates, U.S. Congressman from Virginia, U.S. Senator from Virginia, Governor of Virginia
  - John Hampden Pleasants (1797–1846), journalist and businessman. Son of James Pleasants.
- James J. Pleasants, Secretary of State of Alabama
  - Julia Pleasants Creswell (1827–1886), poet and novelist. Daughter of James J. Pleasants.

== The Plumers ==
- William Plumer (1759–1850), U.S. Senator from New Hampshire 1802–07, Governor of New Hampshire 1812–13 1816–19. Father of William Plumer Jr.
  - William Plumer Jr. (1789–1854), New Hampshire State Representative 1818, New Hampshire State Senator 1827–28, delegate to the New Hampshire Constitutional Convention 1850, U.S. Representative from New Hampshire 1819–25. Son of William Plumer.

== The Plumleys ==
- Frank Plumley (1844–1924), Vermont State Representative 1882, U.S. District Attorney of Vermont 1889–94, Vermont State Senator 1894, Vermont State Court Judge 1902, U.S. Representative from Vermont 1909–15. Father of Charles A. Plumley.
  - Charles A. Plumley (1875–1964), Vermont State Representative 1912–15, U.S. Representative from Vermont 1934–51. Son of Frank Plumley.

== The Polks ==
- Thomas Jones Hardeman, (1788–1854), Texas Republic Representative 1837–39, Judge in the Texas Republic 1843, member of the Texas Legislature 1847–51. Uncle by marriage of James K. Polk.
- Charles Polk Jr. (1788–1857), Governor of Delaware 1827–30 1836–37. Third cousin once removed of James K. Polk, Trusten Polk, and William Hawkins Polk.
  - James K. Polk (1795–1849), Tennessee State Representative 1823–25, U.S. Representative from Tennessee 1825–39, Speaker of the U.S. House of Representative 1835–39, Governor of Tennessee 1839–41, President of the United States 1845–49. Third cousin one removed of Charles Polk Jr.
  - Trusten Polk (1811–1876), delegate to the Missouri Constitutional Convention 1845 1846, Governor of Missouri 1857, U.S. Senator from Missouri 1857–62. Third cousin once removed of Charles Polk Jr.
  - William Hawkins Polk (1815–1862), Tennessee State Representative 1842–45, U.S. Minister to Naples 1845–47, U.S. Representative from Tennessee 1851–53. Third cousin once removed of Charles Polk Jr.
  - William P. Dobson (1793–1846), North Carolina State Senator 1818–19 1827 1830–34 1836 1842. First cousin of James K. Polk and William Hawkins Polk.
    - M.T. Polk (1831–1884), delegate to the Democratic National Convention 1876, Treasurer of Tennessee 1877–83. Nephew and adoptive son of James K. Polk.
    - R.D. Polk (fl. 1890), president of Franceville, New Hebrides. Native of Tennessee and relative of James K. Polk.
- VanLeer Polk (1858–1907), was an American politician and diplomat from Tennessee. Van Leer was also the grandson of Anthony Wayne Van Leer, one of the wealthiest iron works owners in Tennessee.
- Antoinette Van Leer Polk (1847–1919), American Southern belle, Southern heroine and Baroness de Charette

NOTE: Thomas Jones Hardeman was also brother of Texas Republic politician Bailey Hardeman. Trusten Polk was also nephew of Delaware Governor Peter F. Causey. James K. Polk and William Hawkins Polk were also cousins by marriage of Confederate States politician George Davis.

== The Pools ==
- John Pool (1826–1884), North Carolina State Senator 1856 1858, candidate for Governor of North Carolina 1860, U.S. Senator from North Carolina 1868–73. Uncle of Walter F. Pool.
  - Walter F. Pool (1850–1883), U.S. Representative from North Carolina 1883. Nephew of John Pool.

== The Popes ==
The following are members of the Pope family in no particular order:

- William Pope Duval (1784–1854), first governor of Florida Territory.
- John Pope (1770–1845), brother of Nathaniel, U.S. Senator from Kentucky, Governor of Arkansas Territory, U.S. Representative from Kentucky
- Nathaniel Pope (1784–1850), brother of John, Delegate and Secretary of Illinois Territory, U.S. District judge in Illinois.
  - John Pope (1822–1892), son of Nathaniel, U.S. Soldier, Union General in the Civil War.
  - Daniel Pope Cook (1794–1827), nephew of Nathaniel and John, newspaper editor, Attorney General and U.S. Representative from Illinois
    - John Cook, son of Daniel Pope Cook, was a Union general in the Civil War.

== The Porters ==
- Peter Buell Porter (1773–1844), U.S. Representative from New York 1809–13 1815–16, New York Secretary of State 1815–16, candidate for Governor of New York 1817, U.S. Secretary of War 1828–29. Uncle of Augustus Seymour Porter and grandfather of Peter A. Porter.
  - Augustus Seymour Porter (1798–1872), Mayor of Detroit, Michigan 1838–39; U.S. Senator from Michigan 1840–45. Nephew of Peter Buell Porter.
    - Peter A. Porter (1853–1925), New York Assemblyman 1896–97, U.S. Representative from New York 1907–09. Grandson of Peter Buell Porter.

NOTE: Peter Buell Porter was also son-in-law of U.S. Attorney General John Breckinrdige and brother-in-law of Kentucky State Representatives Joseph Cabell Breckinridge and Robert Jefferson Breckinridge. Porter's wife, Letitia, was also widow of Kentucky State Representative Alfred William Grayson.

== The Poseys ==
- John Wesley Posey (1801–1884), Treasurer of Pike County, Indiana 1844–48. Father of Francis B. Posey.
  - Francis B. Posey (1848–1915), delegate to the Republican National Convention 1884, U.S. Representative from Indiana 1889, Surveyor of the Port of Evansville, Indiana 1903–13. Son of John Wesley Posey.
    - John Adams Posey (1889–1963), Prosecuting Attorney in Indiana. Son of Francis B. Posey.

NOTE: The Poseys of Indiana are also distantly related to U.S. Senator Thomas Posey.

== The Potters ==
- Joseph Potter, New York Assemblyman 1798 1814. Grandfather of Clarkson Nott Potter.
  - Clarkson Nott Potter (1825–1882), Surveyor of Wisconsin Territory 1843, U.S. Representative from New York 1869–75 1877–79, delegate to the Democratic National Convention 1872 1876, delegate to the New York Constitutional Convention 1875 1877, candidate for Lieutenant Governor of New York 1879. Grandson of Joseph Potter.

== The Potters of Rhode Island ==
- Elisha Reynolds Potter (1764–1835), Rhode Island State Representative 1793–96 1798–1808 1816–17 1819–35, U.S. Representative from Rhode Island 1796–97 1809–15. Father of Elisha R. Potter.
  - Elisha R. Potter (1811–1882), Adjutant General of Rhode Island 1835–36, Rhode Island State Representative 1838–40, U.S. Representative from Rhode Island 1843–45, Rhode Island State Senator 1847–52 1861–63, Rhode Island Commissioner of Public Schools 1849–54, Justice of the Rhode Island Supreme Court 1868–82. Son of Elisha Reynolds Potter.

== The Powells ==
- Colin Powell (born 1937), Army general; National Security Advisor, 1987–89; Chairman of Joint Chiefs of Staff, 1989–91; Secretary of State, 2001–05.
  - Michael Powell (born 1963), Chairman of the Federal Communications Commission, 2001–05; son of Colin Powell.

== The Powells of New York ==
- Adam Clayton Powell Jr. (1908–1972), U.S. Representative from New York 1945–71. Father of Adam Clayton Powell IV.
  - Adam Clayton Powell IV (born 1962), candidate for New York City Council 1989, New York City Councilman 1992–97, New York Assemblyman 2001–2010. Son of Adam Clayton Powell Jr.

== The Powells of Virginia ==
- Leven Powell (1737–1810), Virginia House Delegate 1779 1787–88 1791–92, U.S. Representative from Virginia 1799–1801. Father of Cuthbert Powell.
  - Cuthbert Powell (1775–1849), Mayor of Alexandria, District of Columbia 1808–09; member of the Virginia Legislature; U.S. Representative from Virginia 1841–43. Son of Leven Powell.

== The Pratts and Baldwins ==
- Daniel Darwin Pratt (1813–1877), Member of the Indiana House of Representatives 1851–1853, U.S. Senator from Indiana 1869–1875, Commissioner of Internal Revenue 1875–1876. Uncle of Daniel P. Baldwin.
  - Daniel Pratt Baldwin (1837–1908) Indiana Attorney General 1880–1882. Nephew of Daniel D. Pratt.

== The Pratts, Thayers, and Nitzes ==
- Ruth Baker Pratt (1877–1965), delegate to the New York Republican Convention 1922 1924 1926 1928 1930 1936 1938, delegate to the Republican National Convention 1924 1932 1936 1940, New York City Alderwoman 1925–29, member of the Republican National Committee 1929–43, U.S. Representative from New York 1929–33. Mother-in-law of Robert H. Thayer and Paul Nitze.
  - Robert H. Thayer (1901–1984), U.S. Minister to Romania 1955–58. Son-in-law of Ruth Baker Pratt.
  - Paul Nitze (1907–2004), Director of the Strategic Bombing Survey 1943–46, U.S. Secretary of the Navy 1963–67. Son-in-law of Ruth Baker Pratt.

== The Pregersons ==
- Harry Pregerson (1923–2017), Judge of the United States District Court for the Central District of California 1967–79, Judge of the United States Court of Appeals for the Ninth Circuit 1979–2015.
  - Dean Pregerson (born 1951), Judge of the United States District Court for the Central District of California 1996–2016. Son of Harry Pregerson.

== The Prentiss ==
- Samuel Prentiss (1782–1857), Vermont State Representative 1824–25, Justice of the Vermont Supreme Court, Chief Justice of the Vermont Supreme Court, U.S. Senator from Vermont 1831–42, Judge of U.S. District Court of Vermont 1842–57. Brother of John Holmes Prentiss.
- John Holmes Prentiss (1784–1861), Postmaster of Cooperstown, New York 1833–37; U.S. Representative from New York 1837–41. Brother of Samuel Prentiss.
  - Theodore Prentiss (1818–1906). Mayor of Watertown, Wisconsin 1853–55 1871–72; Alderman of Watertown, Wisconsin; Wisconsin State Assemblyman 1860–61. Son of Samuel Prentiss.
    - James Prentiss, Mayor of Watertown, Wisconsin. Son of Theodore Prentiss.

== The Prestons ==
- Francis Preston (1765–1836), U.S. Representative from Virginia 1793–97. Father of William C. Preston.
  - William C. Preston (1794–1860), U.S. Senator from South Carolina 1833–42. Son of Francis Preston.
  - William Ballard Preston (1805–1862), Virginia House Delegate 1830–32 1844–45, Virginia State Senator 1840–44, U.S. Representative from Virginia 1847–49, U.S. Secretary of the Navy 1849–50, Confederate States Representative from Virginia 1861, Confederate States Senator from Virginia 1862. Nephew of Francis Preston.
  - William Preston (1816–1887), delegate to the Kentucky Constitutional Convention 1849, Kentucky State Representative 1850 1868–69, Kentucky State Senator 1851–53, U.S. Representative from Kentucky 1852–55, U.S. Minister to Spain 1858–61, Confederate States Minister to Mexico 1864. Nephew of Francis Preston.
  - Wade Hampton III (1818–1902), South Carolina State Senator 1858, candidate for Governor of South Carolina 1865, Governor of South Carolina 1876–79, U.S. Senator from South Carolina 1879–91. Son-in-law of Francis Preston.
    - Eugenie Mary Ladenburg Davie (1895–1975), delegate to the Republican National Convention 1936. Granddaughter-in-law of William Preston.

NOTE: William C. Preston was also grandnephew by marriage of Virginia Governor Patrick Henry. William Preston's grandson, Preston Davie, was also a descendant of North Carolina Governor William Richardson Davie. Wade Hampton III was also grandson of U.S. Representative Wade Hampton I and later son-in-law of U.S. Senator George McDuffie.

== The Prices ==
- William T. Price (1824–1886), Wisconsin Assemblyman 1851 1882, Judge of Jackson County, Wisconsin 1854 1859; Jackson County, Wisconsin Treasurer 1856–57; Wisconsin State Senator 1857 1870 1878–81; Collector of Internal Revenue for Wisconsin 1863–65; U.S. Representative from Wisconsin 1883–86. Father of Hugh H. Price.
  - Hugh H. Price (1859–1904), Madison, Wisconsin Councilman 1885–86; U.S. Representative from Wisconsin 1887; Surveyor General of Arizona Territory. Son of William T. Price.

== The Pritchards ==
- Jeter Connelly Pritchard (1857–1921), U.S. Senator from North Carolina 1895–1903, Justice of the District of Columbia 1903–04, Judge of U.S. Court of Appeals 1904–21. Father of George M. Pritchard.
  - George M. Pritchard (1886–1955), North Carolina State Representative 1916–17, Solicitor in North Carolina 1919–22, U.S. Representative from New York 1929–31, candidate for U.S. Senate from North Carolina 1930, candidate for Governor of North Carolina 1940 1948, candidate for U.S. Representative from North Carolina 1952. Son of Jeter Connelly Pritchard.

== The Pritzkers ==
- Nicholas Pritzker (1871–1957), lawyer
  - Harry Nicholas Pritzker (1892–1956), businessman. Son of Nicholas Pritzker.
  - Abram Nicholas Pritzker, businessman and lawyer. Son of Nicholas Pritzker.
    - Jay Pritzker (1922–1999), businessman. Son of Abram Nicholas Pritzker.
    - Cindy Friend Pritzker (1923–2025), philanthropist. Wife of Jay Pritzker.
      - Thomas Pritzker (born 1950), businessman. Son of Jay Pritzker and Cindy Friend Pritzker.
      - John Pritzker (born 1953), businessman. Son of Jay Pritzker and Cindy Friend Pritzker.
        - Adam Pritzker (born 1984), businessman. Son of John Pritzker.
        - Noah Pritzker (born 1986), film director and screenwriter. Son of John Pritzker.
      - Gigi Pritzker (born 1962), businesswoman. Daughter of Jay Pritzker and Cindy Friend Pritzker.
      - Daniel Pritzker (born 1959) musician and film director. Son of Jay Pritzker.
    - Robert Pritzker (1926–2011), businessman. Son of Abram Nicholas Pritzker.
      - Jennifer Pritzker (born 1950), businesswoman and philanthropist. Daughter of Robert Pritzker.
      - Linda Pritzker (born 1953), Buddhist Lama. Daughter of Robert Pritzker.
        - Rachel Pritzker, political activist. Daughter of Linda Pritzker.
      - Karen Pritzker (born 1958), film producer and philanthropist. Daughter of Robert Pritzker.
      - Matthew Pritzker (born 1982), businessman. Son of Robert Pritzker.
      - Liesel Pritzker Simmons (born 1984), heiress and actress. Daughter of Robert Pritzker.
    - Donald Pritzker (1932–1972), businessman. Son of Abram Nicholas Pritzker.
    - Sue Sandel Pritzker (1932–1982), women's rights activist. Wife of Donald Pritzker.
      - Penny Pritzker (born 1959), United States Secretary of Commerce 2013–17. Daughter of Donald Pritzker and Sue Sandel Pritzker.
      - Anthony Pritzker (born 1961), businessman. Son of Donald Pritzker and Sue Sandel Pritzker.
      - J. B. Pritzker (born 1965), Governor of Illinois 2019–present. Son of Donald Pritzker and Sue Sandel Pritzker.
      - Mary Kathryn Muenster Pritzker (born 1967), First Lady of Illinois 2019–present. Wife of J. B. Pritzker.
  - Jack Nicholas Pritzker (1904–1979), businessman. Son of Nicholas Pritzker.
  - Rhoda Goldberg Pritzker (1914–2007), philanthropist. Wife of Jack Nicholas Pritzker.
    - Nicholas J. Pritzker (born 1945), businessman and philanthropist. Son of Jack Nicholas Pritzker and Rhonda Goldberg Pritzker.

== The Proctors ==
- Redfield Proctor (1831–1908) Governor of Vermont, 1878 to 1880; Secretary of War, 1889 to 1891; United States Senator for Vermont, 1891 to 1908.
  - Fletcher D. Proctor (1860–1911), Governor of Vermont, 1906 to 1908.
    - Mortimer R. Proctor (1889–1968), Governor of Vermont, 1945 to 1947; Lieutenant Governor of Vermont, 1941 to 1945.
  - Redfield Proctor Jr. (1879–1957), Governor of Vermont, 1923 to 1925.

== The Proutys ==
- John A. Prouty (1826–1900), Vermont State Representative 1858–59 1884. Third cousin of Charles Newton Prouty.
- Charles Newton Prouty (1842–1916), Massachusetts State Senator 1907–08. Third cousin of John A. Prouty.
  - Charles A. Prouty (1853–1921), State Attorney of Orleans County, Vermont 1882–86; Vermont State Representative 1888; candidate for U.S. Senate from Vermont 1914. Son of John A. Prouty.
  - George H. Prouty (1862–1918), Vermont State Representative 1896–97, Vermont State Senator 1904, Lieutenant Governor of Vermont 1906–08, Governor of Vermont 1908–10, delegate to the Republican National Convention 1916. Son of John A. Prouty.
  - Willard R. Prouty, Vermont State Representative 1917, Vermont State Senator 1927. Son of John A. Prouty.
    - Winston L. Prouty (1906–1971), Vermont State Representative 1941 1945–47, U.S. Representative from Vermont 1951–59, U.S. Senator from Vermont 1959–71. Son of Willard R. Prouty.

== The Pratts and Romneys ==
- William Pratt (1609–1670), lieutenant, Pequot War. Representative, General Court (Colonial Legislature) of Connecticut, served 23 terms.
  - Parley P. Pratt (1807–1895) Mormon apostle; member, Utah Territorial Legislature, 1854. The 3rd great-grandson of William Pratt
  - Orson Pratt (1811–1881) Mormon apostle; member, Utah Territorial Legislature, 1869–79. The brother of Parley P. Pratt.
    - Vernon Romney (1896–1976), Utah Republican executive committeeman 1936–62, delegate to the Republican National Convention 1944 1948 1952 1960 1964, chairman of the Utah Republican Party 1944–50 1958–62, Republican National Committeeman 1944–50 1958–62. Grandson of Partley P. Pratt.
      - Vernon B. Romney (1924–2013), Attorney General of Utah 1969–76, candidate for Governor of Utah 1976. Son of Vernon Romney.
      - Marion G. Romney (1897–1988), member of the Utah Legislature. Nephew of Vernon Romney.
        - George W. Romney (1907–1995), Governor, Michigan 1963–69; Republican presidential candidate, 1968; HUD Secretary, 1969–73. Great-grandson of Parley P. Pratt.
          - Willard Mitt Romney (born 1948), Governor, Massachusetts, 2003–07; son of George Wilcken Romney. 2008 Republican presidential candidate & 2012 Republican presidential nominee.
          - G. Scott Romney Candidate for Michigan Attorney General 1998, Michigan State University Board of Trustees member. Brother of Mitt Romney, Son of George and Lenore.
        - Lenore Romney (born 1909) Candidate for the U.S. Senate, from Michigan, 1970. She married George Wilcken Romney; mother of Willard Mitt Romney; former-mother-in-law of Ronna Romney.
          - Ronna Romney (born 1943), Alternate delegate, Republican National Convention, Michigan, 1988; member, Republican National Committee, Michigan, 1988; candidate for the U.S. Senate, Michigan, 1994 (primary), 1996. As the ex-wife of Scott Romney, she is a daughter-in-law of George Wilcken Romney and Lenore Romney.
            - Ronna Romney McDaniel (born 1973), Committeewoman to the Republican National Committee from Michigan, 2014-2015; Chair of the Michigan Republican Party, 2015-2017; 65th Chair of the Republican National Committee, 2017-2024. Daughter of Scott and Ronna Romney.

== The Pruyns ==
- John Pruyn (1677–1749), assistant alderman of Albany (1710–1711), alderman (1718–1726), justice of the peace (appointed 1728)
- Samuel Pruyn (1677–1752), member Albany Board of Aldermen (1729–1731)
- Francis S. Pruyn (1704–1767), fire master of Albany (1731–1732), assistant alderman (1745–1746), alderman (1761–1762)
- Samuel Pruyn, (1800–1862), member of the Albany County Board of Supervisors (1841–1849)
- John V. L. Pruyn, member of the United States House of Representatives from New York (1862–1863, 1863–1865, 1867–1869)
  - John V. L. Pruyn Jr. (1859–1904), military aide to Governor David B. Hill, member of Albany Board of Health (1887), member, Albany Board of Aldermen (1888–1890).
- Robert H. Pruyn, Speaker of the New York State Assembly (1850, 1854), U.S. Minister to Japan, 1861–1865
  - Robert C. Pruyn, son of Robert H. Pruyn, member of the Board of Regents of the University of the State of New York

== The Pryors ==
- David Pryor (born 1934), Arkansas State Representative 1960–66, U.S. Representative from Arkansas 1966–73, Governor of Arkansas 1975–79, U.S. Senator from Arkansas 1979–97. Father of Mark Pryor.
  - Mark Pryor (born 1963), Arkansas State Representative 1991–94, Attorney General of Arkansas 1999–2002, delegate to the Democratic National Convention 2000, U.S. Senator from Arkansas 2003–2015. Son of David Pryor.

== The Pynchons ==
- William Pynchon (1590–1662), Puritan colonist and founder of Springfield, Massachusetts and Roxbury, Massachusetts, colonial treasurer and original patentee of the Massachusetts Bay Colony, author of first banned book "The Meritorious Price of Our Redemption" Ancestor of Dr Thomas Ruggles Pynchon III, Thomas Ruggles Pynchon Sr (IV) and author Thomas Pynchon(V)
  - Dr. Thomas Ruggles Pynchon III (1823–1904), President of Trinity College 1874–1883. Grand Uncle of Thomas Ruggles Pynchon Sr (IV) and Great Grand Uncle of Thomas Pynchon. Descendant of William Pynchon.
    - Thomas Ruggles Pynchon Sr (IV)(1907–1995), Supervisor of Town of Oyster Bay, New York 1963, Superintendent of Highways for Town of Oyster Bay, New York 1950s-1962, son of William H. Pynchon, father of author Thomas Pynchon (V), Grand Nephew of Dr. Thomas Ruggles Pynchon III, descendant of William Pynchon
      - Thomas Pynchon (V) author, son of Thomas Ruggles Pynchon Sr (IV)
