= George Peter =

George Peter may refer to:

- George Peter (politician, born 1779) (1779–1861), US congressman from Maryland
- George Peter (politician, died 1893) (1829–1893), US Maryland politician, son of George Peter (1779–1861)
- George Peter (technician) (1922–2008), Cornell University technician

== See also ==
- George Peters (disambiguation)
