= George Peters =

George Peters may refer to:

- George Peters (aviator) (1894–?), Australian flying ace in World War I
- George Peters (footballer) (1912–1988), Australian footballer
- George Peters (banker), Governor of the Bank of England, 1785–1787
- George Peters, American football, an 8th round pick by the Washington Redskins in the 1942 NFL draft
- George Peters, German-born American artist, created murals and mascot for Milwaukee sausage maker Usinger's in 1906
- George Fountain Peters, builder in 1899 of Glen Store and Post Office, Potomac, Maryland
- George G. Peters of Boston, commissioned and in 1907 owned the ship later renamed USS Wanderlust
- George Henry Peters (1863–1947), American astronomer
- George J. Peters (1924–1945), American soldier and Medal of Honor recipient
- George N. H. Peters (1825–1909), American religion writer
- George Silas Peters (1846–1928), mayor of Columbus, Ohio, 1881–1882
- George W. Peters, president and dean of Fresno Pacific University, 1947–1960

== Characters ==
- George Peters (EastEnders), soap opera character
- George Peters, in the 1934 film Mandalay, played by Lucien Littlefield
- George Peters, in the 1955 film A Word to the Wives..., played by Darren McGavin
- George Peters, in the 1959 television series Manhunt, fictional detective played by Charles Bateman
- George Peters, a character in The $5,000,000 Counterfeiting Plot

== Places ==
- George Peters House, on the National Register of Historic Places listings in Outagamie County, Wisconsin
- George W. Peters House, on the National Register of Historic Places listings in Knoxville, Tennessee
- George Peters Family Cemetery, in Hensley Township, Champaign County, Illinois

== See also ==
- George Rea (George Peters Rea, 1894–?), president of the American Stock Exchange
- George Peter (disambiguation)
