= Susan Walker Fitzgerald =

American politician

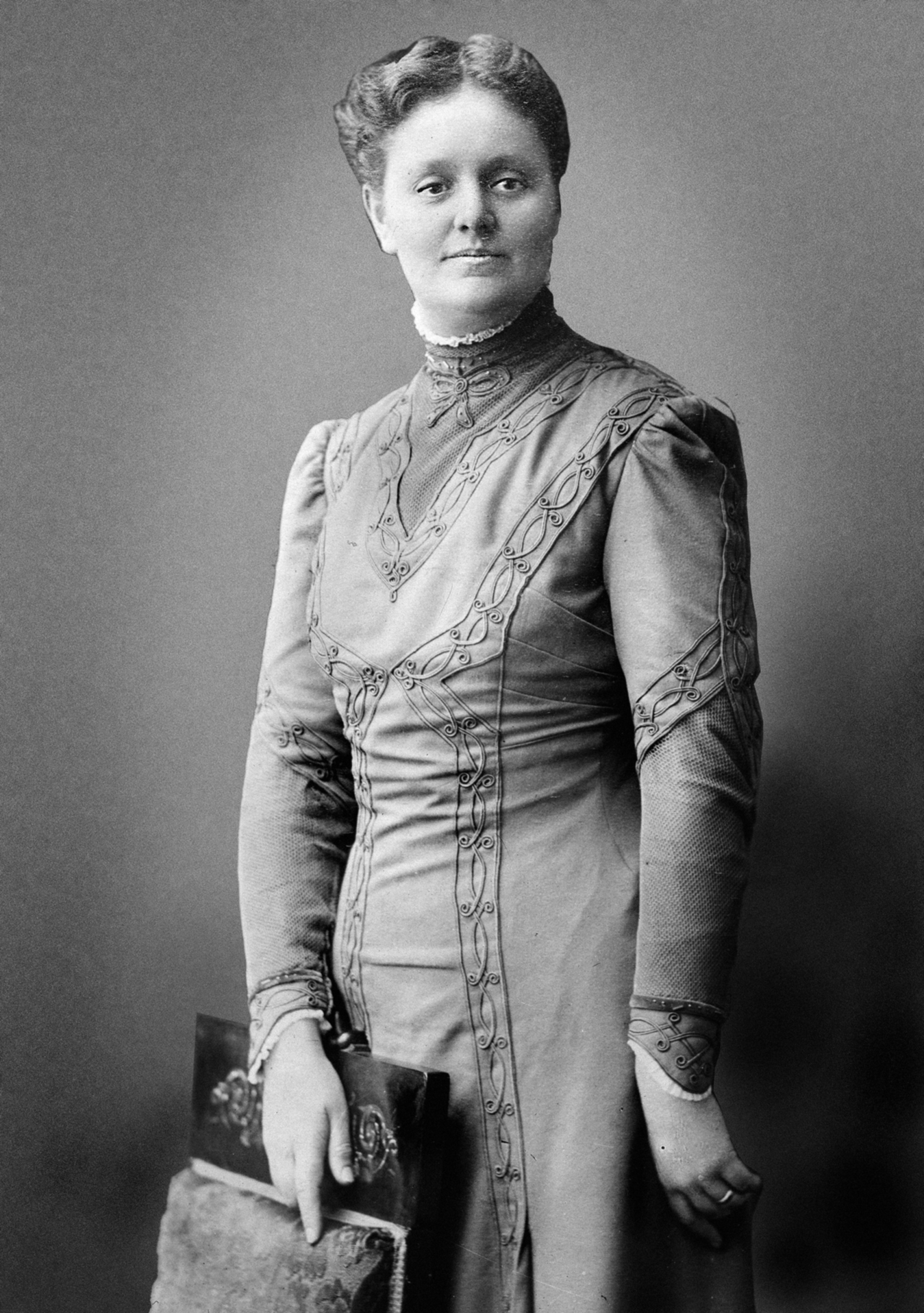
- Susan Grimes Walker circa 1910
- Born: Susan Walker; May 9, 1871; Cambridge, Massachusetts
- Died: January 20, 1943, aged 72
- Occupations: Legislator and reformer
- Known for: First Female Democrat to enter the Massachusetts House of Representatives

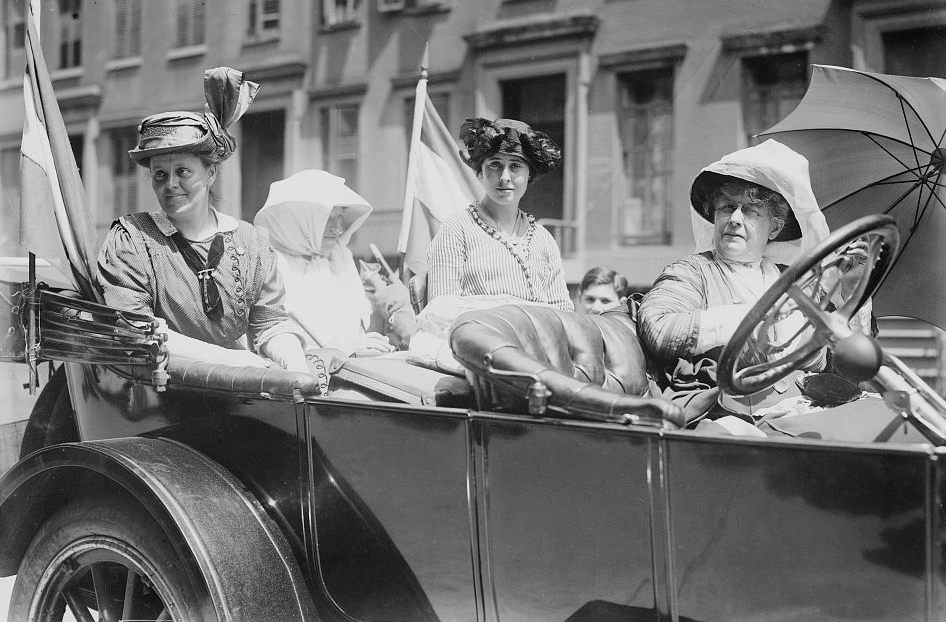
Susan Walker Fitzgerald, Harriot Eaton Stanton Blatch, Maggie Murphy, and Emma Bugbee circa 1910

Susan Grimes Walker (May 9, 1871 – January 20, 1943) is best known for her long commitment to women's suffrage, and for her involvement in progressive political organizations. In 1923, she became one of the first two women elected to the Massachusetts House of Representatives.

== Biography ==
She was born on May 9, 1871, in Cambridge, Massachusetts, to Rear Admiral John Grimes Walker, USN and Rebecca White Pickering. Her father was a Civil War veteran, having served at the Siege of Vicksburg, inter alia. Her mother was from the prominent Pickering family of Salem, Massachusetts. She was a direct descendant of Timothy Pickering, John Pickering, and Henry White Pickering.

Following the advice and encouragement of her cousin Alice Gould who graduated from Bryn Mawr College in 1889, she enrolled at Bryn Mawr and graduated with a degree in political science and history in 1893. During her time at Bryn Mawr, she founded the Student Government Association and served as her class president. Following her graduation, she worked, as secretary to M. Carey Thomas - from 1893 to 1894 when Thomas was dean, and from 1894 to 1895 after Thomas became Bryn Mawr's president.

Subsequently, Susan began working as the administrative head of Barnard College's first dormitory, Fiske Hall, in 1898. She was engaged to Richard Y. FitzGerald in July 1900 and the couple married on August 3, 1901. She took the name Susan Walker FitzGerald. Because men were not allowed into the dormitory, she changed jobs and served as head worker at the Richmond Hill Settlement House in New York City from 1901 to 1904. She was a prominent member of the first New York Child Labor Committee and was involved in establishing important child labor laws and in working for a compulsory education law. Richard Y. FitzGerald was an attorney who graduated from the University of California in 1895 and Harvard Law School in 1898 and practiced primarily in New York and Boston. He was the son of Nancy Rose McCoy and Adolphus Leigh Fitzgerald, elected to the Supreme Court of Nevada in November 1900. Richard's family owned silver mines and a water works plant in Eureka, Nevada as well as a large ranch named Clear Creek in Redding, California.

They had four children: Anne (born 1902), Rebecca Pickering (1906), Susan (1908), and Richard Leigh (1914). All three of the daughters attended Bryn Mawr. Anne received her A.B. degree in 1924, Rebecca in 1926, and Susan in 1929. Richard attended Princeton University. Anne went on to earn a master's degree from Radcliffe College, Rebecca earned the Ph.D. from the University of Vienna, and Susan earned an M.A. from Middlebury College.

Richard and Susan lived at the Clear Creek ranch from 1904 to 1906. They were separated for two months when their infant daughter, Rebecca, required care in San Francisco for a serious feeding problem. Richard remained on the ranch with their older daughter during this period. Susan and Rebecca returned to the ranch four days prior to the famous San Francisco earthquake.

Richard fell seriously ill with typhoid fever in 1906 and the entire family returned east by train. They settled initially at her parents' home in Washington, D.C., so that Richard could recuperate. After some serious debate Richard finally agreed to stay on the east coast. Early in 1907 Susan negotiated a paying job supervising Pauline Shaw's social work in Boston to tide them over while Richard established a new legal career. They moved to Hyde Park later in 1907, then to Jamaica Plain, Boston in 1911. Susan was active in the suffrage movement and politics, but continued her salaried work until 1913 when Richard became General Counsel of the pioneering New England Power System Companies.

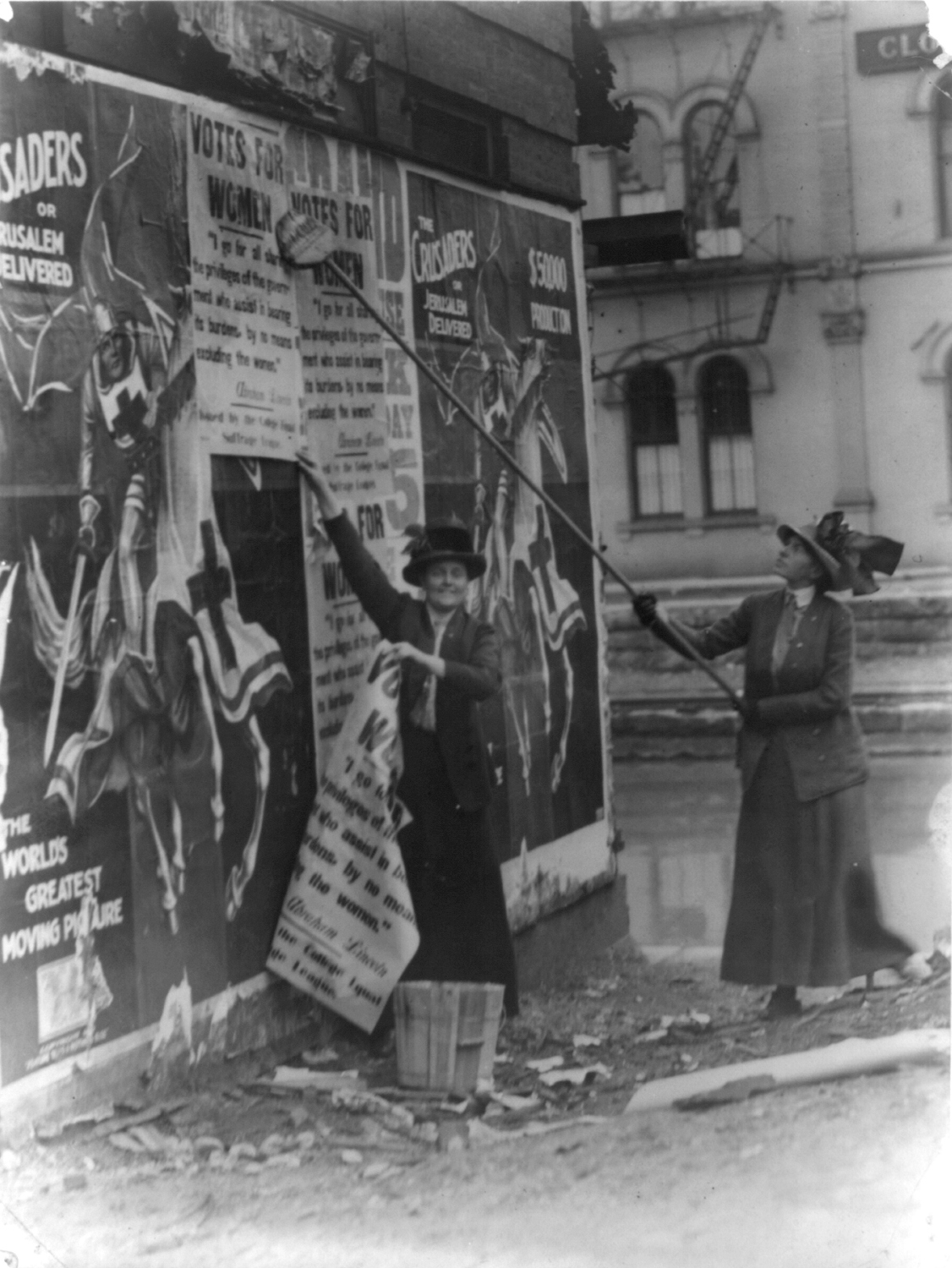
Susan Fitzgerald and Louise Hall bill posting in Cincinnati, 17 May 1912

She served as Executive Secretary of the Boston Equal Suffrage Association for Good Government in 1907 and the Massachusetts Woman Suffrage Association in 1911. In addition, she served as the recording secretary for the large and influential National American Woman Suffrage Association (NAWSA) from 1911 to 1915. She was respected as a public speaker and participated in numerous state suffrage campaigns. In 1911–1912 she ran unsuccessfully for a school board seat in Boston. In 1920 Susan served as the National Committeewoman of the Women's Division of the Democratic State Committee in Massachusetts. She was elected in 1923 as the first female Democrat to enter the Massachusetts House of Representatives; Sylvia M. Donaldson was elected the same year as the first female Republican. Susan served for one term from 1923 to 1925.

She died in 1943.

== Writings ==
- Women in the Home (1908)
- What is a Democracy? (1910)
- Have We a Democracy? (1913)

== Archive ==
A large collection of archival material relating to her life is housed at the Bryn Mawr College Library.

== See also ==
- 143rd Massachusetts General Court
