= Robert Peter =

Mayor of Georgetown, United States

Mayor of Georgetown, Maryland
- In office January 4, 1790 – January 3, 1791
- Preceded by: Office established
- Succeeded by: Thomas Beale

Personal details
- Born: July 22, 1726 East Kilbride, Scotland
- Died: November 15, 1806 (aged 80) Georgetown, D.C., U.S.
- Resting place: Oak Hill Cemetery

Robert Peter (July 22, 1726 – November 15, 1806) was an American politician, merchant, and landowner who served as the first mayor of Georgetown, Maryland.

== Early life and family ==
Coat of Arms of Robert Peter

Robert Peter was born on July 22, 1726, in East Kilbride, South Lanarkshire, Scotland. His ancestral home was Crossbasket Castle in Scotland. He emigrated to British America in 1746 at the age of 20.

In December 1767, he married Prince George's County native Elizabeth Scott, the daughter of George Scott, High Sheriff of Prince George's County. They had ten children (one of whom died as an infant). Their names were Thomas, Alexander, Elizabeth, Walter, Robert, Jean, Margaret, David, George, and James.

Peter may have also fathered two illegitimate daughters with a widow, Cassandra Chew. Their names were Mary and Harriet.

== Career ==
=== Landowner ===
Shortly after arriving to British America, Peter opened a general store, working as a storekeeper and tobacco merchant. He established a successful import/export trade business and resided in the town of Bladensburg, Maryland.

In 1752, he moved to Georgetown where he opened a general store and served as the purchasing agent for John Glassford's Scottish tobacco firm. His general store provided supplies for troops during the American Revolutionary War and was recommended by General George Washington as a reputable establishment. He owned an entire city block in the Congress Street and Wisconsin Avenue section of Georgetown which was known as "Peter's Square."

Peter was a prominent landowner in Maryland and the Mount Pleasant and Pleasant Plains sections of what is now Washington, D.C. He owned and built numerous residential properties and estates, and also owned numerous tobacco-producing farms.

In June 1791, he was the first of 19 landowners who sold land holdings to President George Washington and the federal government for the formation of the District of Columbia. He and the other men were honored with the title: "Original Proprietors of the City of Washington."

=== Public service ===
His public service included serving as a justice of the peace in Frederick County, Maryland.

In 1790, Georgetown's government was changed to include a Mayor, a Recorder, Aldermen and a Common Council. He was elected Georgetown's first mayor and took office in January 1790. He was also elected to the Board of Commissioners of Georgetown, serving thirty-two years in the office.

== Death ==
Peter died on November 15, 1806, at the age of 80. At the time of his death, he owned over 20,000 acres of land and had a net worth of approximately US$480,000 ($11.7 million in 2022 figures).

He was buried at the Presbyterian Burying Ground. His remains were later exhumed in 1981 and reinterred in a family plot at Oak Hill Cemetery.

== Legacy ==
His son Thomas Peter and his wife, Martha Parke Custis Peter (a granddaughter of Martha Washington) built Tudor Place, a federal-style mansion in Washington, D.C., that now serves as a museum and historic landmark. His son George was a major in the War of 1812 and member of the U.S. House of Representatives from Maryland's 3rd congressional district.

One of his grandsons, George Jr., was the President of the Maryland State Senate.
