= J. Russell Sprague =

County Executive of Nassau County, New York (1886–1969)

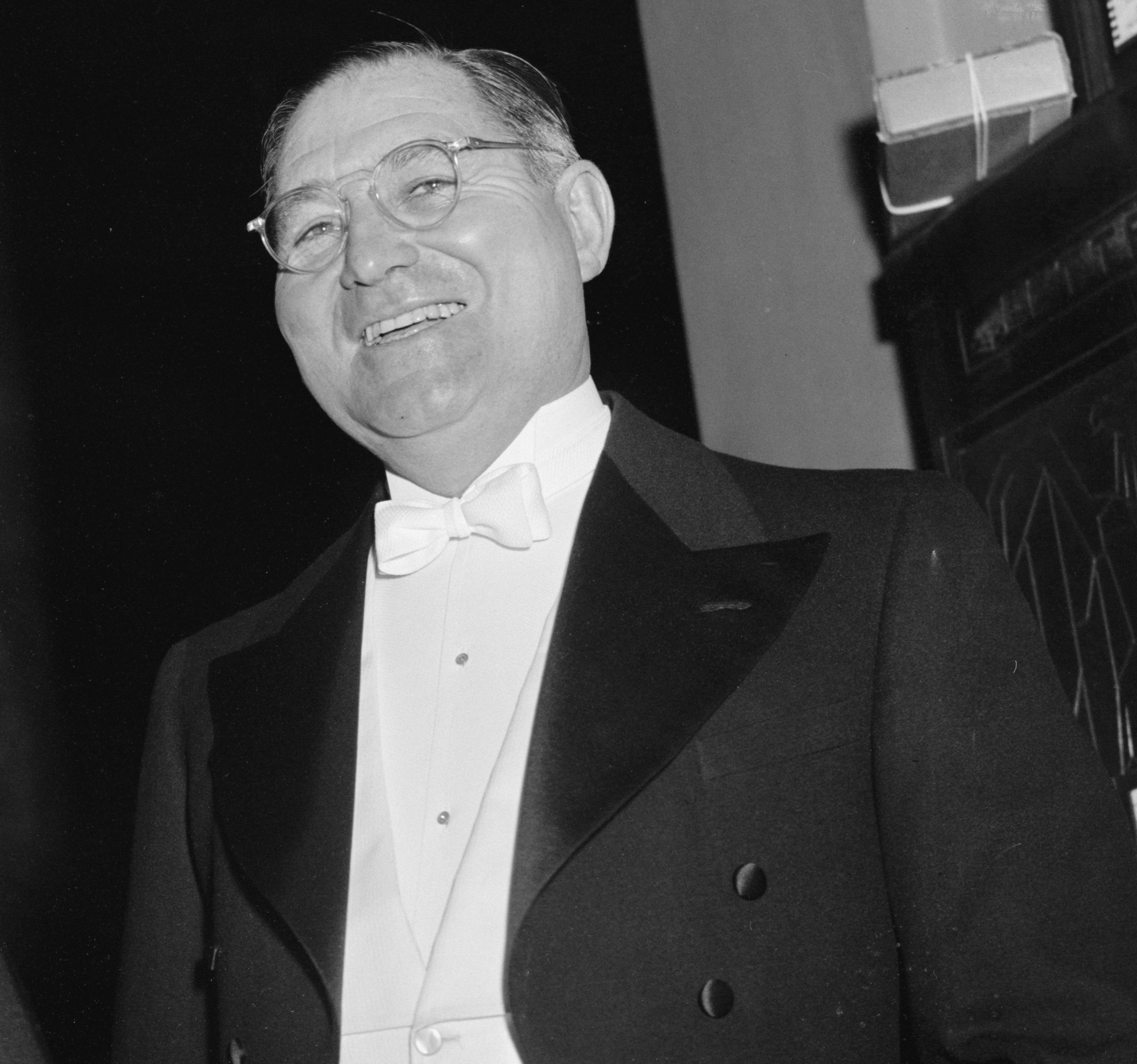
Sprague in 1939

John Russell Sprague (December 24, 1886 – April 17, 1969) was the Republican county executive of Nassau County, New York from 1938 until 1953. He also was a delegate to the Republican National Convention in 1936, 1940, 1944, 1948, 1952, and 1956 and part of Republican National Committee from New York during 1940–1948.

== Life ==
Born in Inwood, New York, Sprague was an instrumental politician in Nassau County. He took center stage in adopting a county charter that created the position of county executive. In November 1937, he was the first person elected to that office. Prior to serving as county executive, Sprague worked as a lawyer in Far Rockaway.

By the end of his time serving as county executive at the end of 1952, Sprague lived in Roslyn Estates, New York.

Political offices
Preceded by position created	County Executive of Nassau County, New York; 1938–1952	Succeeded by A. Holly Patterson
