= Henry Ridgely Warfield =

American politician

Henry Ridgely Warfield (September 14, 1774 – March 18, 1839) was a U.S. representative from Maryland. He was born in Anne Arundel County, Maryland, at the 1300-acre property "Bushy Park". He was the son of Charles Alexander Warfield and Eliza Ridgely, and grandson of Maj. Henry Ridgely. His father, Dr. Warfield (1751–1813), was an originator of the medical school of the University of Maryland, and as a member of the Whig club, set fire to the Peggy Stewart at Annapolis, Maryland, destroying her cargo of tea.

He held several local offices. He later settled in Frederick, Maryland, and was elected to the Sixteenth, Seventeenth, and Eighteenth Congresses, serving from March 4, 1819, to March 3, 1825, as a Federalist representative. He died in Frederick.

U.S. House of Representatives
Preceded by George Peter	Member of the U.S. House of Representatives from Maryland's 5th congressional district 1819–1825	Succeeded by George Peter
