= Henry White Pickering =

American businessman and banker

- Born: May 27, 1811; Salem, Massachusetts, United States
- Died: August 15, 1898 (aged 87); Boston
- Education: Harvard College
- Occupation: Banker
- Known for: President of the Boston Stock Exchange
- Spouse: Frances Dana Goddard (m. 1835)
- Children: 3

Henry White Pickering (May 27, 1811 – August 15, 1898) was an American businessman who was president of the Boston Stock Exchange and the Old Boston National Bank.

== Early life ==
Pickering was born on May 27, 1811, in Salem, Massachusetts to John and Sarah White Pickering. He was the grandson of Timothy Pickering and a cousin of Charles Pickering. He graduated from Harvard College in 1831 and taught at the Chauncy Hall School until 1834, when he started his own school.

In 1835, Pickering married Frances Dana Goddard. They had three children; Rebecca White, Frances Goddard, and Henry Goddard. Rebecca White Pickering was married to Rear Admiral John Grimes Walker. One of their daughters, Susan Walker Fitzgerald, was one of the first two women elected to the Massachusetts House of Representatives.

== Business career ==
Pickering began his business career in the counting room of his father-in-law, Nathaniel Goddard. He took over the stock and exchange brokerage of his brother-in-law, George A. Goddard, following his death in 1845. From 1847 to 1852, 1856 to 1860, and 1864 to 1870 he was president of the Boston Stock Exchange. In 1876, he gave up his exchange business to become president of the Old Boston National Bank. He retired in 1891, but remained with the bank a director until his death on August 15, 1898, at his home in Beverly, Massachusetts.

== Government service ==
Pickering served multiple terms on the Roxbury common council and after the city was annexed by Boston, was a member of Boston's common council, license commission, and board of overseers of the poor.

== Music ==
Pickering was a founder of the Harvard Musical Association and was the organization's president from 1852 to 1877. The Harvard Musical Association donated the money for the construction of the Boston Music Hall and Pickering was a director of the Music Hall Association for many years.
