= Glen Store and Post Office =

Historic structure in Potomac, Maryland, US

Coordinates: 39°2′43.1″N 77°13′1.3″W

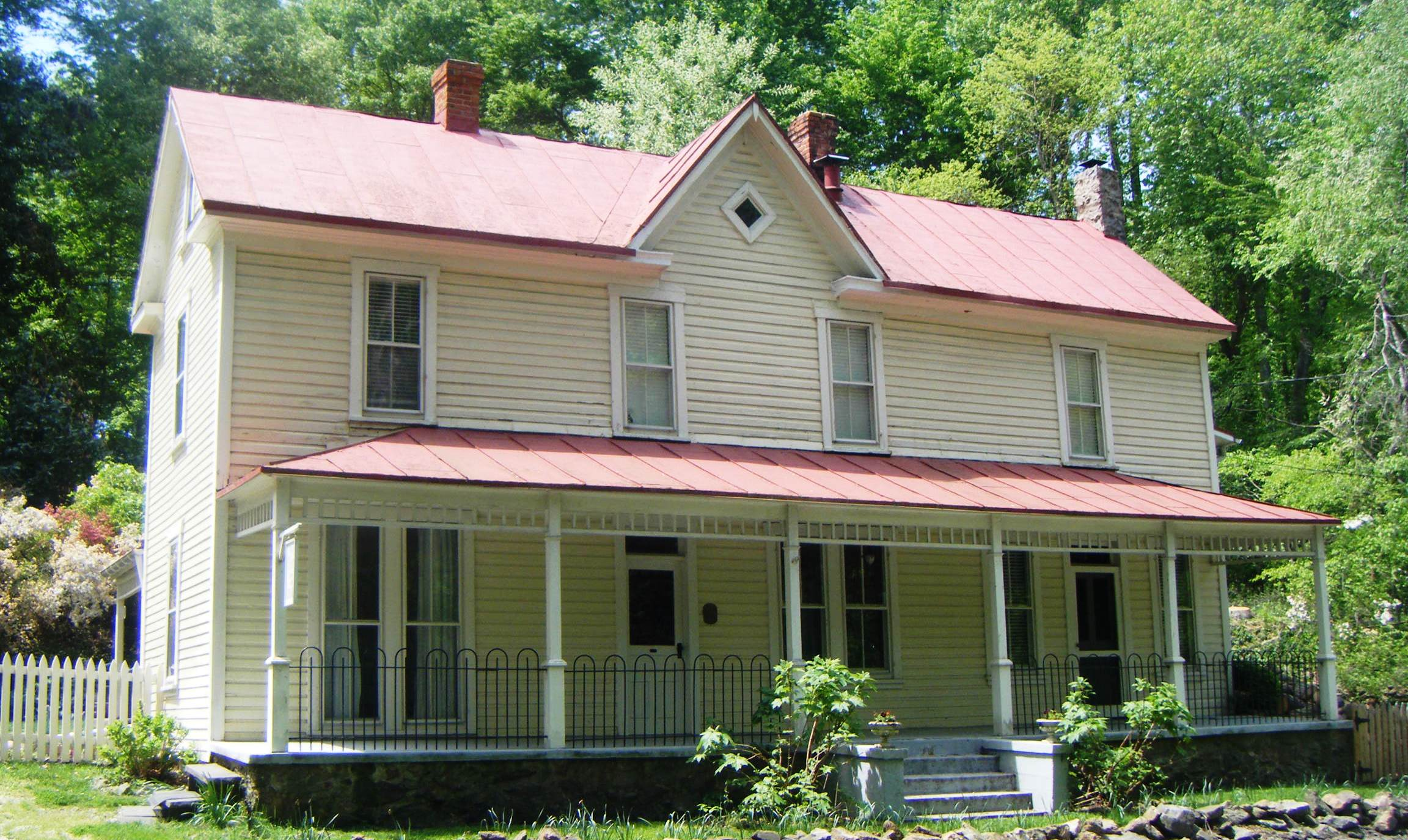

The Glen Store and Post Office is a late 19th-century home located in Potomac, Maryland.

== Structural Description ==
The 2 1/2-story house is built close to the road on fieldstone foundations. There are two porches, one on the east side of the house on the second story, one in the front, and another on the south end. All of them have shed roofs and are supported by wooden posts. There are two-over-two double-hung windows, some flanked by wooden louvered shutters. At the south end of the house, two of the windows extend down to the porch. There are also six light-casement windows on the south gable end and a diamond-shaped window on each side of the east and west cross gables. The roof is gabled with cross-gabled peaks on the eat and west elevations. The roof itself has a red raised seam metal covering. The house has 2 interior chimneys and an exterior chimney at the north gable end.

The property is 2 acres (8,100 m^{2}) in total. There is a shed (now used as a garage) and a chicken coop. There used to be a gristmill in the backyard, though it was demolished due to decomposition in the 1950s.

== History ==
Before the Glen became a general store and post office, it was a gristmill and sawmill owned by George R. Bell. In 1884, the then 84-acre (340,000 m^{2}) property was bought by Lucy J. Peters. In the 1890s, Peter's son, George Fountain Peters, married and built the Glen house/store around 1899. The Glen became a post office of the Glen community in 1907 when the two surrounding communities Tulip and Glen became assimilated under the one name Glen. It remained in the Peter's family until 1952, when the property was bought by Ralph and Renee Gunkel. The Gunkels then sold it to the present owners, the Kings, in 1972.
