= Peters House (Knoxville, Tennessee) =

Historic house in Tennessee, United States

- U.S. National Register of Historic Places
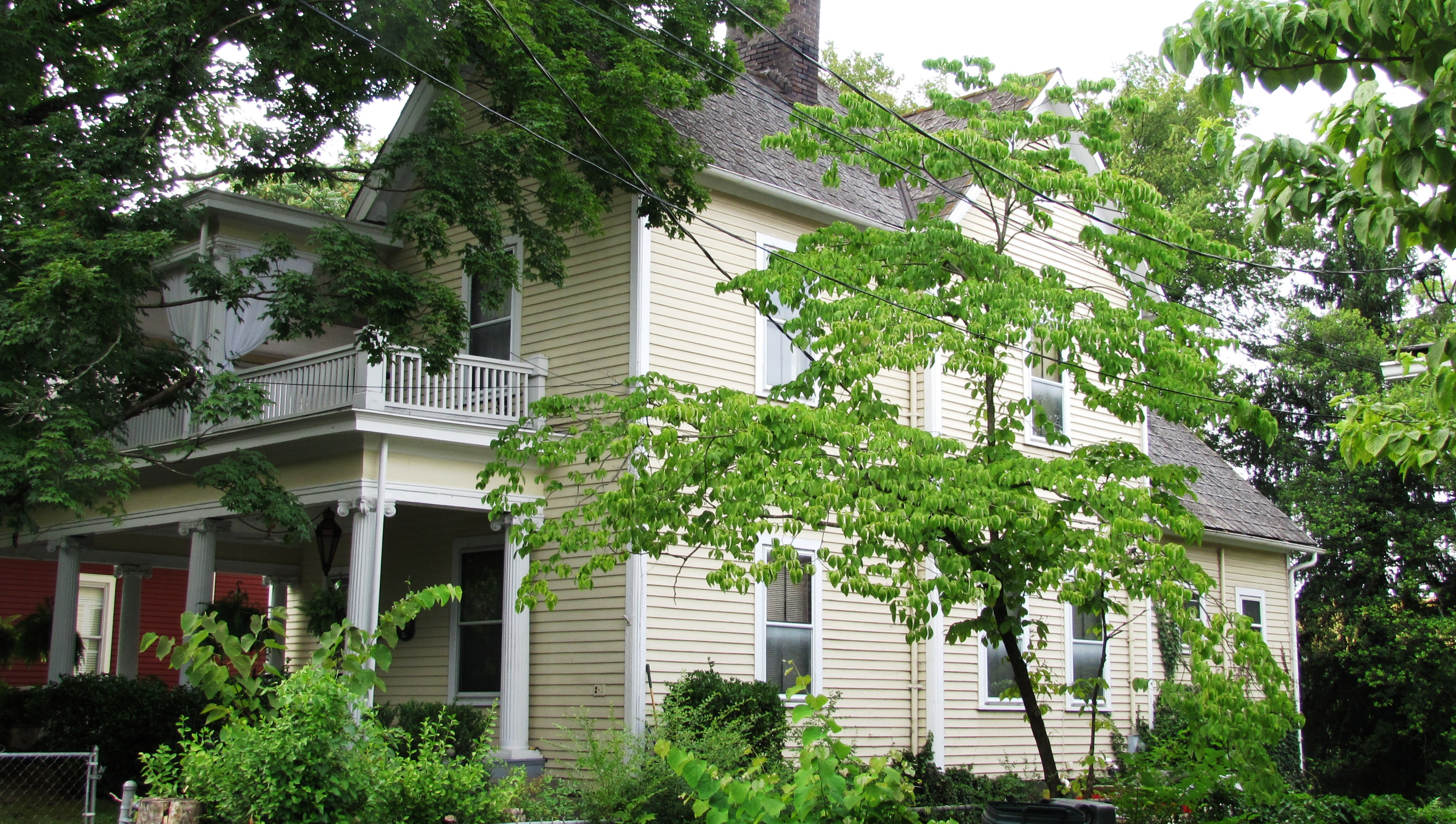

- Location within Tennessee Location within the United States
- Location: 1319 Grainger Ave., Knoxville, Tennessee
- Coordinates: 35°59′20″N 83°55′10″W
- Area: 0.5 acres (0.20 ha)
- Built: ca. 1860s, additions ca. 1880s
- Architect: George F. Barber
- Architectural style: Colonial Revival
- MPS: Knoxville and Knox County MPS
- NRHP reference No.: 99000364
- Added to NRHP: March 31, 1999

The Peters House is a historic home located at 1319 Grainger Avenue in Knoxville, Tennessee. It is on the National Register of Historic Places. It is also known as White Columns or Columned Portals, as well as the George W. Peters House.

The oldest part of the home was built in the 1860s as a four-room house, typical of an East Tennessee farmhouse. Behind the house there was a walkway across First Creek that connected the home with the owners' family business, the Peters & Bradley Mill, a grist mill.

A major addition and renovation was undertaken in the 1880s by William E. Peters, using an architectural design by local architect George Franklin Barber. The addition more than doubled the size of the building. Its design displays Victorian and Neoclassical influences. A prominent feature is a large two-story front porch with columns. Original drawings for the expansion are held by the McClung Historical Collection.

George Franklin Barber began publishing his homes in inexpensive, illustrated catalogs. He worked between 1887 and 1913, with a staff of approximately 50. Mr. Barber warned residents of the horrors of a house not designed by a trained architect, noting that Geo. F. Barber & Co. was "between you and a hideous monstrosity". Barber houses were primarily constructed in the United States, but were also found in other countries.

The Peters House is privately owned, and is not open to the public.
