= A. Holly Patterson =

American politician

Archibald Holly Patterson (May 31, 1898, in Uniondale, New York, United States – September 20, 1980) was the Republican county executive of Nassau County, New York, from 1953 to 1961. He had previously served as presiding supervisor of the town of Hempstead.

A nursing home in Uniondale is named for Patterson as well as the school library at Nassau Community College.

Political offices
Preceded by J. Russell Sprague	County Executive of Nassau County, New York; 1953–1961	Succeeded by Eugene Nickerson
