= George Peter (politician, born 1779) =

American politician

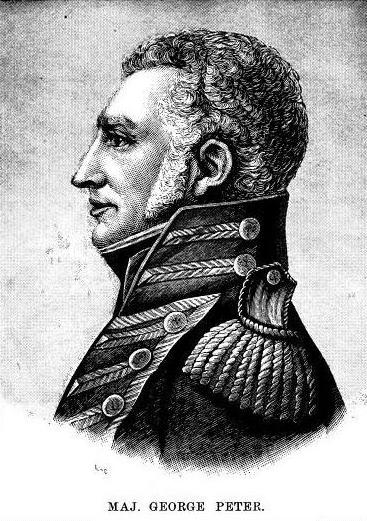

Member of the U.S. House of Representatives from Maryland's 3rd district
- In office October 7, 1816 – March 4, 1819
- Preceded by: Alexander C. Hanson
- Succeeded by: Henry R. Warfield
- In office March 4, 1825 – March 4, 1827
- Preceded by: Henry R. Warfield
- Succeeded by: George C. Washington

Personal details
- Born: September 28, 1779 Georgetown, Maryland, US (now in Washington, D.C.)
- Died: June 22, 1861 (aged 81) Darnestown, Maryland, US
- Occupation: Politician

George Peter (September 28, 1779 – June 22, 1861) was a U.S. representative from Maryland.

== Biography ==
Born in Georgetown, Maryland, (now in Washington, D.C.) and the son of Mayor of Georgetown Robert Peter, Peter pursued classical studies and graduated from Georgetown College. At the age of fifteen, Peter joined the Maryland troops in the campaign against the Whisky Insurrectionists in 1794, but at the request of his parents, was sent home.

Peter was commissioned in the United States Army by President John Adams, at the request of George Washington, as a second lieutenant in the Ninth Infantry in July 1799. He was transferred to the artillery in February 1801. In 1806 he was in command of Fort Bellefontaine when the Lewis and Clark Expedition returned. In May 1808, Peter was promoted to captain and organized and commanded the first company of light artillery in the country. He resigned from the Army on June 11, 1809, and engaged in agricultural pursuits. He later served as a major of volunteers in the War of 1812.

Peter was elected as a Federalist to the Fourteenth Congress to fill the vacancy caused by the resignation of Alexander C. Hanson. He was reelected as a Federalist to the Fifteenth Congress and served from October 7, 1816, to March 3, 1819. Afterwards, Peter served in the Maryland House of Delegates from 1819 to 1823.

Peter was elected as a Jacksonian to the Nineteenth Congress, and served from March 4, 1825, to March 3, 1827. He was an unsuccessful candidate for reelection in 1826 to the Twentieth Congress, and resumed agricultural activities. He served as commissioner of public works of Maryland in 1855, and later retired to his plantation. He died near Darnestown, Maryland, and is interred in Oak Hill Cemetery in Georgetown.

Peter was married a total of three times. His son George Peter stepped in his footsteps and became a member and president of the Maryland State Senate.

U.S. House of Representatives
Preceded by Alexander Contee Hanson	Member of the U.S. House of Representatives from Maryland's 3rd congressional district 1816–1819	Succeeded by Henry Ridgely Warfield
Preceded by Henry Ridgely Warfield	Member of the U.S. House of Representatives from Maryland's 3rd congressional district 1825–1827	Succeeded by George Corbin Washington
