= John Pickering (linguist) =

American linguist

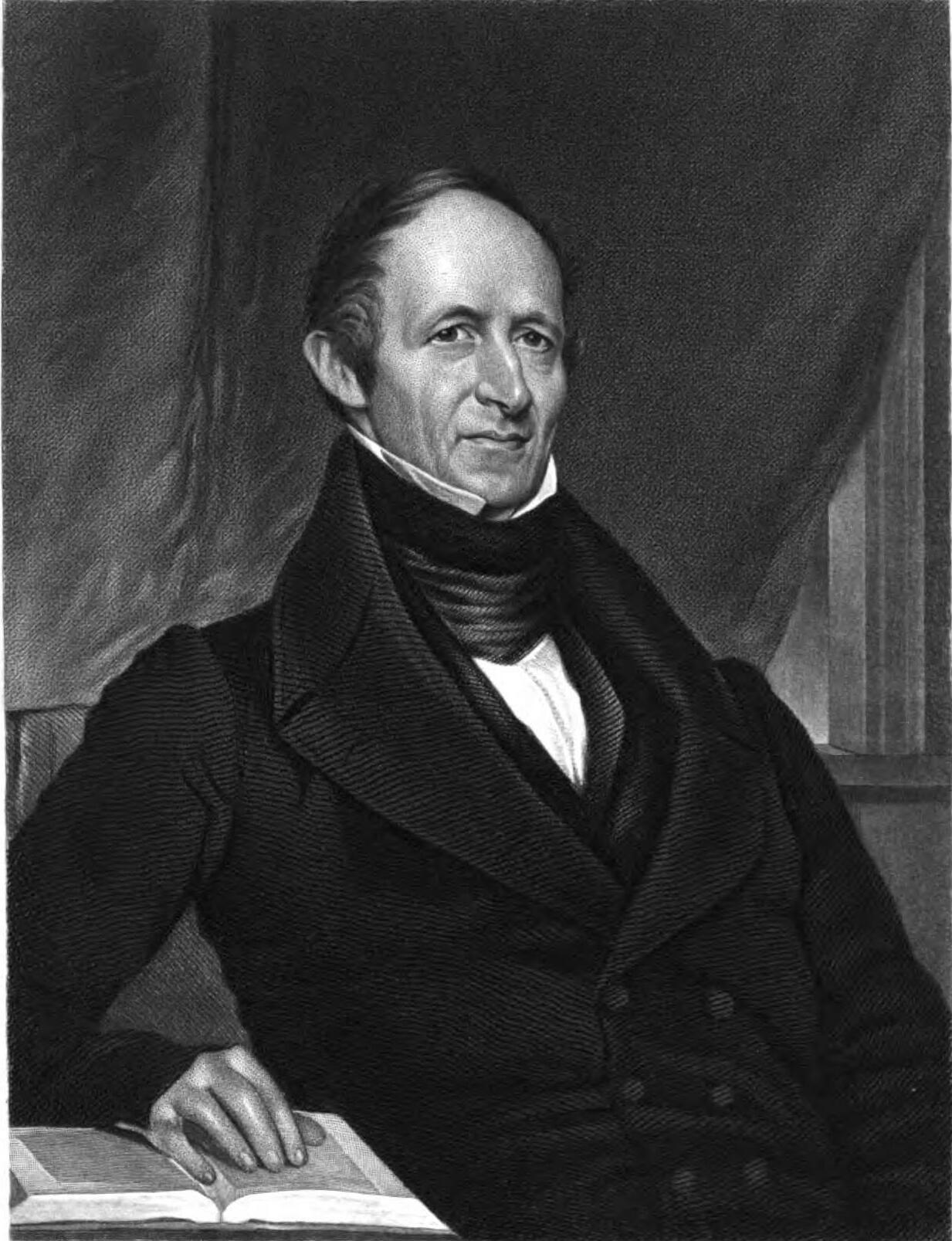
- Born: 7 February 1777; Salem
- Died: 5 May 1846 (aged 69); Boston
- Occupation: Linguist, politician, writer, philologist, jurist
- Parent(s): Timothy Pickering; Rebecca White Pickering
- Awards: Fellow of the American Academy of Arts and Sciences
- Position held: member of the Massachusetts House of Representatives

John Pickering (February 7, 1777 – May 5, 1846) was an American linguist, lawyer, and politician in Salem, Massachusetts. He served as president of the American Academy of Arts and Sciences, from 1839 to 1846. He was elected to the American Philosophical Society. He is buried at Broad Street Cemetery, Salem.

== Early life ==
Pickering was born in 1777 in Salem, Massachusetts to Timothy Pickering and Rebecca (White) Pickering. In 1778 the family moved to Philadelphia, where the elder Pickering was serving as adjutant general of the Continental Army.

In 1780 the family relocated to New York state when the Army headquarters moved to Newburgh, New York. In May of 1783, Rebecca Pickering and her children moved back to Philadelphia due to her ill health, while her husband remained in New York.

In 1786, the Pickerings moved to Luzerne County, Pennsylvania. But, at this time, John Pickering was sent to live with his unmarried uncle and namesake in Salem for his education. After lower level schooling, he graduated from Harvard University in 1796.

== Europe ==
In 1797, Pickering was appointed as the secretary to the United States Minister to Portugal William Loughton Smith. In 1800 he accepted the same position with Rufus King, the United States Minister to the United Kingdom.

While in Europe, Pickering amassed a valuable book collection. His book purchases eventually put him in debt and he was forced to sell 2,000 volumes at a public auction. Several hundred of these ended up in the library of Princeton College.

== Return to United States ==
In 1801 Pickering returned to the United States in 1801 and settled again in Salem with his paternal uncle. There he studied law ("read the law") in the office of Samuel Putnam, who was married to one of Pickering's cousins. He was admitted to the bar in 1804.

At the time Pickering was still residing with his unmarried uncle, a widowed aunt, and a second cousin, Sarah White. Pickering and White formed a friendship. On March 3, 1805, Pickering and White married in a ceremony held in the parlor of the Pickering Mansion. The couple moved to a home on Chestnut Street in Salem. Later that year, their daughter, Mary Orne Pickering, was born. Their eldest son, John Pickering Jr., was born on November 8, 1808. Their final child, Henry White Pickering, was born on May 27, 1811.

== Academic works ==
In 1803, Harvard had begun requiring students to read Sallust prior to admission. This prompted Salem booksellers to publish a reprint of Sallust. Pickering and Daniel Appleton White, a fellow law student, edited an edition of Sallust's works to be sold to students.

In 1806, Pickering was offered the position of Hancock Professor of Hebrew and other Oriental Languages at Harvard University, but declined it. Later that year he wrote a review of Rees's Cyclopædia for the Monthly Anthology.

In May of 1810 he was elected a fellow of the American Academy of Arts and Sciences. In 1814 he was considered for the newly created Eliot Professorship of Greek Literature at Harvard College, but his other duties kept him from taking the job. Shortly after the Linnaean Society of New England was founded, Pickering was elected a corresponding member. In 1818 he was elected to the Harvard Board of Overseers.

In 1815, Pickering's memoir on American English was published by the American Academy of Arts and Sciences. The following year his A vocabulary; or, Collection of words and phrases, which have been supposed to be peculiar to the United States of America was republished by Cummings and Hilliard.

In 1818 he wrote his Memoir on the Pronunciation of the Greek Language. The following year he wrote an article on the subject of Indigenous languages of the Americas for the North American Review. He and Peter Stephen Du Ponceau edited and provided observations for an edition of John Eliot's A Grammar of the Massachusetts Indian Language that was published in 1822.

In 1822 he was elected a member of the American Antiquarian Society. In 1826 his translation of Cornelis Schrevel's Greek Lexicon was published.

== Political career ==
In 1812 and 1827, Pickering represented Salem in the Massachusetts House of Representatives. During his first term he chaired a committee on impressed seamen and wrote an extensive report on the subject. In 1814, he was named district attorney for Essex County, Massachusetts. In 1815, he represented Essex County in the Massachusetts Senate. In 1818, he was a member of the Massachusetts Governor's Council.

== Legal career ==
In 1821, Pickering and John King were assigned to represent Stephen Merrill Clark, a 16-year-old from Newburyport, Massachusetts who was charged with arson. It was then classified as a capital offense. Clark was found guilty and hanged on May 10, 1821.

Outrage at the execution of the youth resulted in the state legislature's reducing the punishment for arson to life imprisonment or any term of years in prison.

Political offices
Preceded by Samuel Putnam	District attorney of Essex County, Massachusetts; 1814–1824	Succeeded by Stephen Minot
