= George Peter (politician, died 1893) =

American politician (1829–1893)

Member of the Maryland Senate from the Montgomery County district
- In office 1878–1888

Personal details
- Born: November 28, 1829 Montgomery County, Maryland, U.S.
- Died: August 9, 1893 (aged 63)
- Resting place: Oak Hill Cemetery
- Party: Democratic
- Children: 5
- Parent: George Peter (father)
- Occupation: Politician; lawyer

George Peter (November 28, 1829 – August 9, 1893) was an American politician and lawyer from Maryland.

== Early life ==
George Peter was born in Montgomery County, Maryland, to politician George Peter and Sarah Norfleet Freeland.

== Career ==
Peter followed in his father's footsteps and became a delegate to the Maryland constitutional convention in 1864.

In 1878, Peter became a member of the Maryland State Senate, which he remained until 1888. In 1888 he also became president of the Senate.

Peter practiced law in Rockville for about 35 years.

== Personal life ==
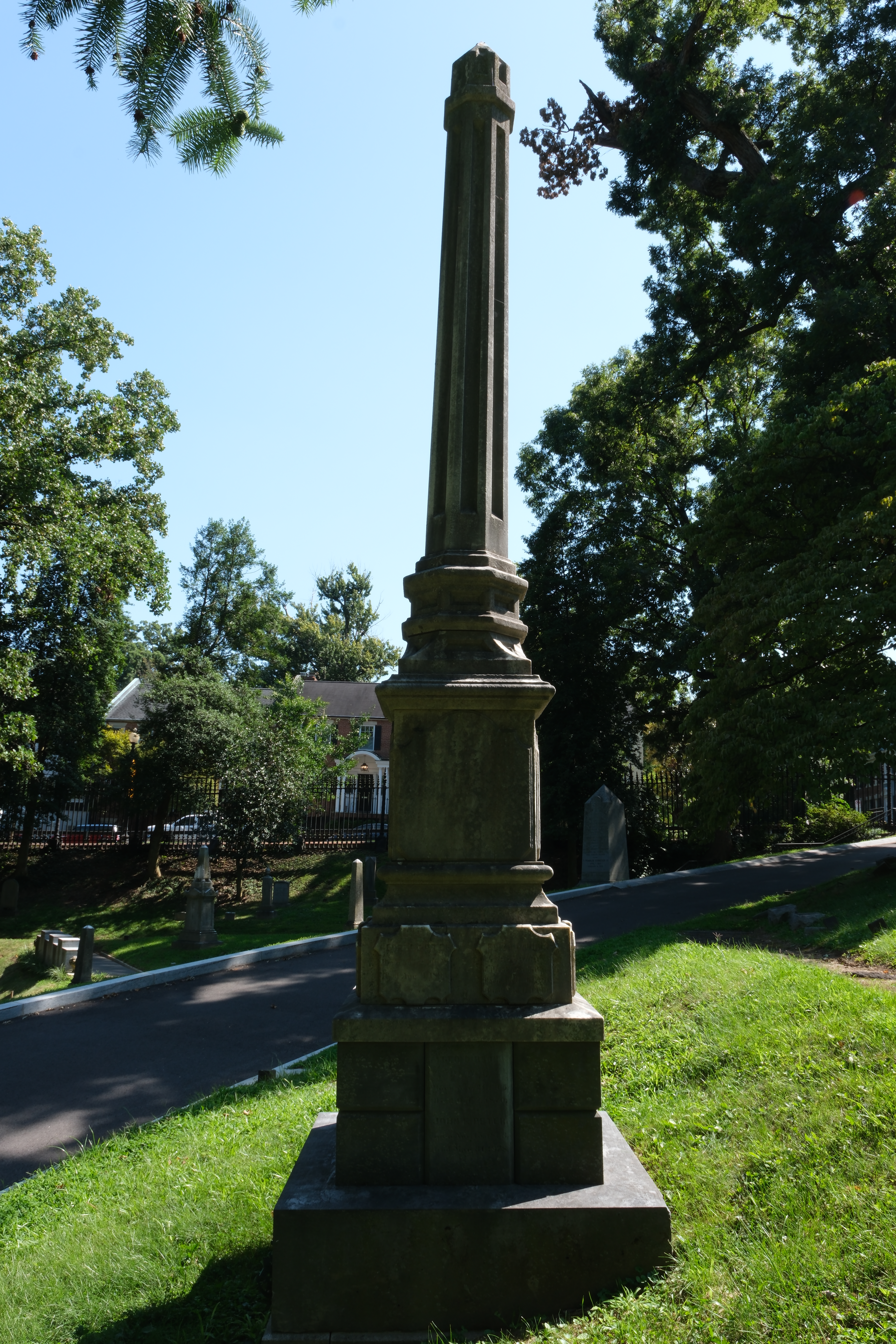
Grave of George Peter at Oak Hill Cemetery, Washington, D.C.

Peter married. He had three sons and two daughters, Edward C., Robert B., Arthur, Mrs. William T. Dunlop and Mrs. Nelson. His son Arthur Peter became a Maryland politician.

Peter died on August 9, 1893, in the courthouse in Rockville. He was buried in Oak Hill Cemetery, Washington D.C.

Political offices
Preceded by Edwin Warfield	President of the Maryland State Senate; 1888	Succeeded by Robert F. Brattan
