= Jennifer Pritzker =

American billionaire (born 1950)

- Pritzker in 2019
- Born: August 13, 1950 (age 76); Chicago, Illinois, U.S.
- Education: Loyola University Chicago (BA)
- Occupations: Investor, philanthropist
- Known for: First transgender billionaire, founder of Tawani Foundation and Pritzker Military Museum & Library
- Political party: Republican (formerly)
- Spouses: Ayelet ben Mordechai (div. 1987) Lisa I. Goren (div. 1997) Erin E. Solaro (m. 2020)
- Children: 3
- Parent: Robert Pritzker (father)
- Awards: Colonel (honorary) (IL)
- Military career
- Allegiance: United States
- Branch: United States Army; Illinois Army National Guard
- Service years: 1974–1977 (U.S. Army); 1979–1985 (U.S. Army); 1985–2001 (ILARNG)
- Rank: Lieutenant colonel
- Awards: Meritorious Service Medal; Army Commendation Medal (2); Army Achievement Medal (2); Good Conduct Medal; Army Reserve Good Conduct Medal (4)

Jennifer Natalya Pritzker (born August 13, 1950) is an American investor, philanthropist, and member of the Pritzker family. Pritzker retired as a lieutenant colonel from the Illinois Army National Guard (ILARNG) in 2001, and was later made an honorary Illinois colonel. Founder of the Tawani Foundation in 1995, Tawani Enterprises in 1996, and the Pritzker Military Museum & Library in 2003, Pritzker has been involved with civic applications of inherited and accrued wealth, including significant donations to broaden understanding and support for "citizen soldiers."

In August 2013, Pritzker released a statement to employees at Tawani Enterprises and the Pritzker Military Museum & Library that subsequently received wide media coverage, indicating the change from "J. N." to "Jennifer Natalya" to reflect her status as a transgender woman, making her the first openly transgender billionaire.

She is the cousin of current Illinois governor J. B. Pritzker and former US Secretary of Commerce Penny Pritzker.

== Early life ==
She was born to Robert Pritzker and Audrey (née Gilbert) Pritzker in Chicago, Illinois. Five years of her youth were spent in Oberlin, Ohio, living next door to the Weltzheimer/Johnson House, which Pritzker cites as an establishing factor in her love for Frank Lloyd Wright, architecture, and preservation and restoration in general.

As a granddaughter of A.N. Pritzker, she is a member of the Pritzker family, one of the wealthiest families in America. Her ancestors immigrated to America with very little, with great grandfather Naphtali ben Yakov Pritzker escaping pogroms as a child in the Russian Empire in 1881 and working through poverty to see eventual success as head of a thriving law firm in Chicago. She has two siblings, Linda Pritzker (b. 1953) and Karen Pritzker Vlock (b. 1958). Her parents divorced in 1979, and she has two half-siblings, Matthew Pritzker and Liesel Pritzker Simmons, from the remarriage of her father, Robert, to Irene Dryburgh in 1980. (Her mother also remarried, to Albert B. Ratner in 1981). Pritzker is Jewish.

== Military career ==
Pritzker says her most memorable experiences in life were in Israel in October 1973 when she witnessed events of the Yom Kippur War. Pritzker enlisted in the U.S. Army on February 8, 1974, and served with the HQ Troop, and with the B Troop, 1st Squadron, 17th Cavalry Regiment, 82nd Airborne Division based at Fort Bragg, North Carolina, rising to the rank of Sergeant. Pritzker's roles while enlisted included aviation repair parts clerk, rifleman, and fire team leader.

After completing military service in February 1977, Pritzker enrolled at Loyola University of Chicago, majoring in history, and entered its Army Reserve Officers' Training Corps program. Pritzker graduated with a BA in History in May 1979, and received commission as an Army officer that same month.

Pritzker first served with the 1st Battalion, 503rd Infantry Regiment, 101st Airborne Division based at Fort Campbell, Kentucky, with duty assignments that included leading rifle and TOW platoons, and time in the Commandant Division, and the Anti-Armor School. Pritzker served as a staff officer with the VII Corps at Kelley Barracks, in Germany, from 1984–1985. Her active duty ended in 1985. After 16 years in the Army Reserves and Illinois Army National Guard, Pritzker retired from the Army National Guard as a lieutenant colonel, in 2001. After retiring, Pritzker was made an honorary Illinois colonel.

While serving, Pritzker was awarded the Meritorious Service Medal, the Army Commendation Medal with Oak Leaf Cluster, the Army Achievement Medal with Oak Leaf Cluster, the Good Conduct Medal, the Army Reserve Components Achievement Medal with 3 Oak Leaf Clusters, the National Defense Service Medal with Star, the Antarctic Service Medal, the Military Outstanding Volunteer Service Medal, the Armed Forces Reserve Medal with 20 year Device, the NCO Professional Development Ribbon, the Army Service Ribbon, the Army Reserve Component Overseas Training Ribbon, the State of Louisiana Legion of Merit, the State of Illinois Long and Honorable Service Medal with Oak Leaf Cluster, the State of Illinois Military Attendance Ribbon with Numeral 6, the U.S. Army Parachute Badge and the Air Assault Badge.

Pritzker earned airborne badges from Israel, Russia, Canada, the Netherlands, and Great Britain, as well as from Poland; according to Steven Mrozek, "Most memorable of these was a parachute jump at the North Pole with the Russians in 1993."

On September 17, 2024, Pritzker was awarded a Badge of Honor from the Ukrainian National Guard’s Presidential Brigade, in honor of her commitment to supporting Ukraine in its war against Russia. More than $5.4 million has been contributed through Pritzker’s personal efforts and grants provided by Tawani Foundation, with $1.3 million in cold weather gear for the Ukrainian National Guard, and $3.6 million toward Operation White Stork, a “no weapons” non-profit organization led by U.S. veterans to provide individual first aid kits and other medical needs in Ukraine.

== Business career ==
Pritzker has founded or served with a number of business and philanthropic organizations. In 1996, she incorporated Tawani Enterprises, where she served as president and CEO, and now serves as chairwoman. Tawani Enterprises is a business entity that provides back-office services to Jennifer Pritzker's organizations.

In 2003, she founded the Pritzker Military Museum & Library, a public charity which provides education on military history and is dedicated to the understanding and support of the "citizen soldier."

In 2016, Pritzker was presented the Bonham Centre Award from The Mark S. Bonham Centre for Sexual Diversity Studies, University of Toronto, for her contributions to the advancement and education of issues around sexual identification.

Jennifer Pritzker is part of a Chicago-based, women-led group headed by Laura Ricketts that purchased NWSL’s Chicago Red Stars in 2023.

=== Family businesses ===
Jennifer Pritzker's father Robert, and Robert's brothers Jay and Donald, built and diversified a Chicago-based family business, the Marmon Group, into a holding company of more than 60 diverse industrial corporations; they also created the Hyatt Hotel chain in 1957, and owned Braniff Airlines from 1983–1988. The family later began divesting of many of these assets. In 2006, the family sold Conwood, a smokeless tobacco company, for $3.5 billion to cigarette company Reynolds American Inc. In 2007, the family sold a 60% stake, and sold control of the Marmon Group to Berkshire Hathaway for $4.5 billion, a sale that it completed in 2013. In 2010, the family sold its majority stake in Transunion, the Chicago-based credit reporting company, to Chicago-based private-equity firm Madison Dearborn Partners for an undisclosed amount. As a member of the Robert's line of the Pritzker family, Pritzker has inherited and accumulated wealth that is estimated at US $2.2 billion.

=== Philanthropy ===
Pritzker created the Tawani Foundation in 1995, which "provides support in the areas of arts and culture, historical preservation, health and wellness, LGBTQ+ and human rights, education and environmental initiatives."

In 2003, the Tawani Foundation made a $1.35 million donation to the Palm Center at the University of California, Santa Barbara, to study the feasibility of transgender people serving in the military and in the ranks of police and fire departments. In 2013, the Foundation donated $25 million to Norwich University, in Northfield, Vermont, the school credited with developing and establishing the first Reserve Officers' Training Corps (ROTC) program in the country.

In 2016, through her Foundation, Pritzker gave a $2 million donation to create the world's first academic Chair in Transgender Studies, at the University of Victoria in British Columbia; Aaron Devor was chosen as the inaugural chair.

The renovation of the Illinois governor’s mansion, a project done completely through private donations, received a contribution from Jennifer Pritzker in 2018, in an amount upward of $250,000.

In 2024, the Foundation announced a $10 million commitment to the Chicago Symphony Orchestra Association, an organization that Col. Pritzker serves on the board for, which includes a $5 million challenge grant.

The Pritzker Military Foundation was created in 2017 and took on the military related avenues of Pritzker’s philanthropy.

==== Political causes ====
Pritzker was a Republican and major donor to candidates and organizations such as the National Rifle Association of America, John McCain, and Mitt Romney. However, as of 2019, she was reevaluating her support, citing the Trump administration's transgender military ban and other anti-LGBTQ policies: "When the GOP asks me to deliver six- or seven-figure contributions for the 2020 elections, my first response will be: why should I contribute to my own destruction?"

In August 2020, Pritzker donated $2,000 to the presidential campaign of Joe Biden.

In October 2020, Pritzker donated $100,000 to the Lincoln Project, led by Republican strategists, some of whom endorsed Joe Biden to prevent the re-election of Donald Trump.

During the third quarter of 2020, Pritzker was recognized as a member of the Chairman's Circle, signifying a $25,000 contribution to the Libertarian Party.

In May 2025, Pritzker donated $39,200 to Toni Atkins, the first openly lesbian president pro tem of the California State Senate and candidate in the 2026 California gubernatorial election.

== Personal life ==
Pritzker has a daughter from a first marriage to Ayelet ben Mordechai, which ended in 1987, and two sons from her marriage to Lisa I. Goren, which ended in 1997. On October 31, 2020, Pritzker married Erin E. Solaro.

In August 2013 it was said publicly that Pritzker was the world's first transgender billionaire.
