= Pritzker Regional Gifted Center =

Pritzker Regional Gifted Center may refer to:

- Abram Nicholas Pritzker (1896–1986), known professionally as A.N. Pritzker, American lawyer, businessman, and philanthropist
- Pritzker School, a pre-K to 8th grade Chicago public school named for A.N. Pritzker
