= The My Hero Project =

U.S based non-profit organization

The My Hero Project is a U.S.-based nonprofit organization established in 1995 by philanthropist Karen Pritzker, Jeanne Meyers and Rita Stern Milch that promotes the sharing of positive role models from around the world for the online digital storytelling project. By 2024, the project had reached 197 countries and has over 125 million participants.

Its primary focus is education, with its resources used in classrooms and after school programs. The organization offers free media arts education resources for people who want to learn digital filmmaking. The annual MY HERO International Film Festival showcases hero-themed films and offers prizes and awards.

The board of directors consists of Jeanne Meyers, Mark Cavanagh, Cynthia Costas Cohen, Judith Zucker Anderson, Carolyn Hodge-West, Eva Haller, Elena Corchero, Kathleen Duhl, Jennifer Borland, Sandy Factor, Barbara MacGillivray, Mohamed Sidibay, Rita Stern Milch, Greg Stamos, Ellen Freeberg, and Nikki D. Pope.

== History ==
The My Hero Project was co-founded by philanthropist Karen Pritzker, the daughter of Robert Pritzker of the Pritzker family, television producer, Jeanne Meyers, and Rita Stern Milch in 1995. The organization has also supported media arts education workshops in the US and internationally through grants from the U.S. Department of Education and the Bureau of Educational and Cultural Affairs.

== Partners ==
My Hero has partnered with iEARN.org, The Abraham Lincoln Library and Museum, Tech-Ed, The National Educational Computing Conference, The American Film Institute Silver Doc’s Workshops, KOCE-OC, Art Miles Mural Project and other internationally recognized nonprofit educational organizations.

== Documentaries ==
The My Hero Project has produced several documentaries, including Eva Haller: A Work in Progress, about philanthropist and mentor Eva Haller, and Woj!, which features educator Esther Wojcicki. Earlier documentaries include: Laguna Beach Eco Heroes, which highlighted the efforts of the Crystal Cove Alliance, ECO-Warrior Foundation, Laguna Bluebelt, Laguna Canyon Foundation, Nancy Caruso, One World One Ocean, Pacific Marine Mammal Center, Wyland, and Zero Trash Laguna in a 30-minute documentary. It was funded by The Massen Greene Foundation and aired on Cox Cable in 2015. It is also on the organization's website. Ecology Center in San Juan Capistrano conducted a water conservation educational program, which included viewing the documentary, with children from the Boys & Girls Club as part of its eighth annual Laguna Hero Fest. Students were given CDs with more information about the environment so that they could explore the topic further on their own.

== The MYHERO International Film Festival ==
The MY HERO International Film Festival was launched in 2005. The first MY HERO International Film Festival was held at USC School of Cinematic Arts. Students and professional filmmakers make short films that honor heroes around the globe. Special awards include the Peace Prize given by Ron Kovic (author of Born on the 4th of July), Youth Reporter Award given by Esther Wojcicki, The Women Transforming Media Award given by Eva Haller, and The Dan Eldon Activist Award given by Kathy Eldon and Amy Eldon, co-founders of Creative Visions Foundation. The Syliva Earle Ocean Conservation Award is given annually by The MacGillivray Freeman Films Educational Foundation. Screenings have been held in the George Lucas Theater at USC School of Cinematic Arts, The American Film Institute, The Moss Theater at The Herb Alpert Educational Village at New Roads School. Due to COVID, the festival has been held virtually for the last two years. Winning films can all be viewed online. Students do not pay to submit their short films to the festival. Short films ten minutes and under that are created as documentaries, animated short films, music videos, narrative films, immersive media and more are recognized. Previous winners include Gabrielle Gorman, Trey Carlisle, Ryan Coogler, Frank Marshall, Slater Jewell Kemker, Skip Blumberg, Gabriel Diamond, Will Parrinello, Yasmine Sherif, and Frances Moore Lappé.
