= Acumed =

- Type: Private
- Industry: Health care Medical technology manufacturing
- Founded: 1988; 38 years ago
- Headquarters: Hillsboro, Oregon, USA; 45.5635°N 122.8974°W
- Products: Medical devices orthopaedic implants
- Number of employees: 475 (2014)
- Website: www.acumed.net

Acumed, LLC is a privately owned medical device manufacturer based in Hillsboro, Oregon in the Portland metropolitan area of the United States. Founded in 1988, the company employs nearly 500 people domestically and internationally who design, manufacture, and market orthopedic implants and surgical devices. The company is a subsidiary of Colson Associates, a spin-off of the Marmon Group, a Berkshire Hathaway company.

== History ==
Randall and Mary Huebner started Accurate Machine and Design in 1988 in New Jersey. Then in 1990 the couple moved the company west to the state of Oregon. After being renamed as Acumed, the company was later one of four nominees from Oregon for the National Blue Chip Enterprises' 1996 award for small business who had faced and overcome challenges. In 1999, Acumed was sold to the Marmon Group, an conglomerate controlled by the Pritzker family.

By April 2001, the company was based in Beaverton, Oregon, and employed 90 people at a 22,000-square-foot (2,000 m^{2}) facility after adding 30 people to the payroll in a years time. That month the company purchased 8.2 acres (3.3 ha) in Hillsboro off Cornelius Pass Road and Jacobson Road for $2.3 million in order to continue expansion. In 2001, the Portland Business Journal ranked Acumed as the ninth largest bioscience and medical technology company in Oregon based on the number of employees. The next year the Marmon Group split off Acumed and its other medical companies into Colson Associates, headed by Robert Pritzker.

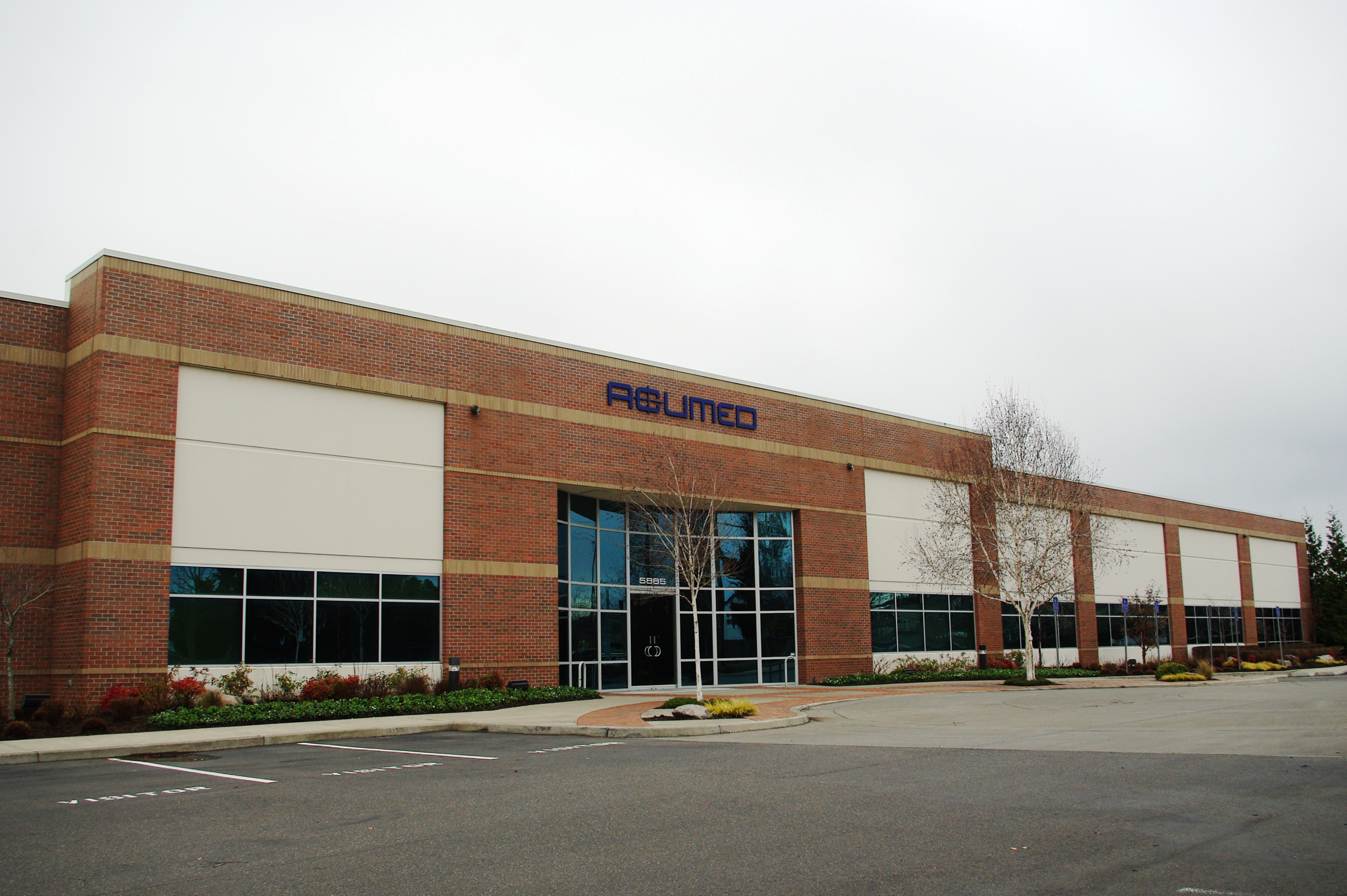
Acumed headquarters

Acumed partnered with Oregon Health Sciences University to fund start-up Acute Innovations in 2006 to refine thoracic surgical procedures. Acute operated out of Acumed's Hillsboro facilities. Due to sales growth, largely on the international side, the company hired an additional 45 people in 2006, bringing total employment at the company to 195. Alan Kozlowski was the president of the company at that time.

Acumed's plant suffered a small fire in May 2007 when a titanium lathe caught fire, which only damaged the $350,000 machine. A jury found that Stryker Corporation willfully infringed on Acumed's patent on a shoulder fracture treatment in a September 2005 verdict. After a mostly unsuccessful appeal by Stryker to the Federal Circuit, judge Anna J. Brown of the federal district court in Portland issued a permanent injunction in December 2007 that prevented Stryker from selling its humeral nail. The Federal Circuit court then affirmed the permanent injunction a year later.

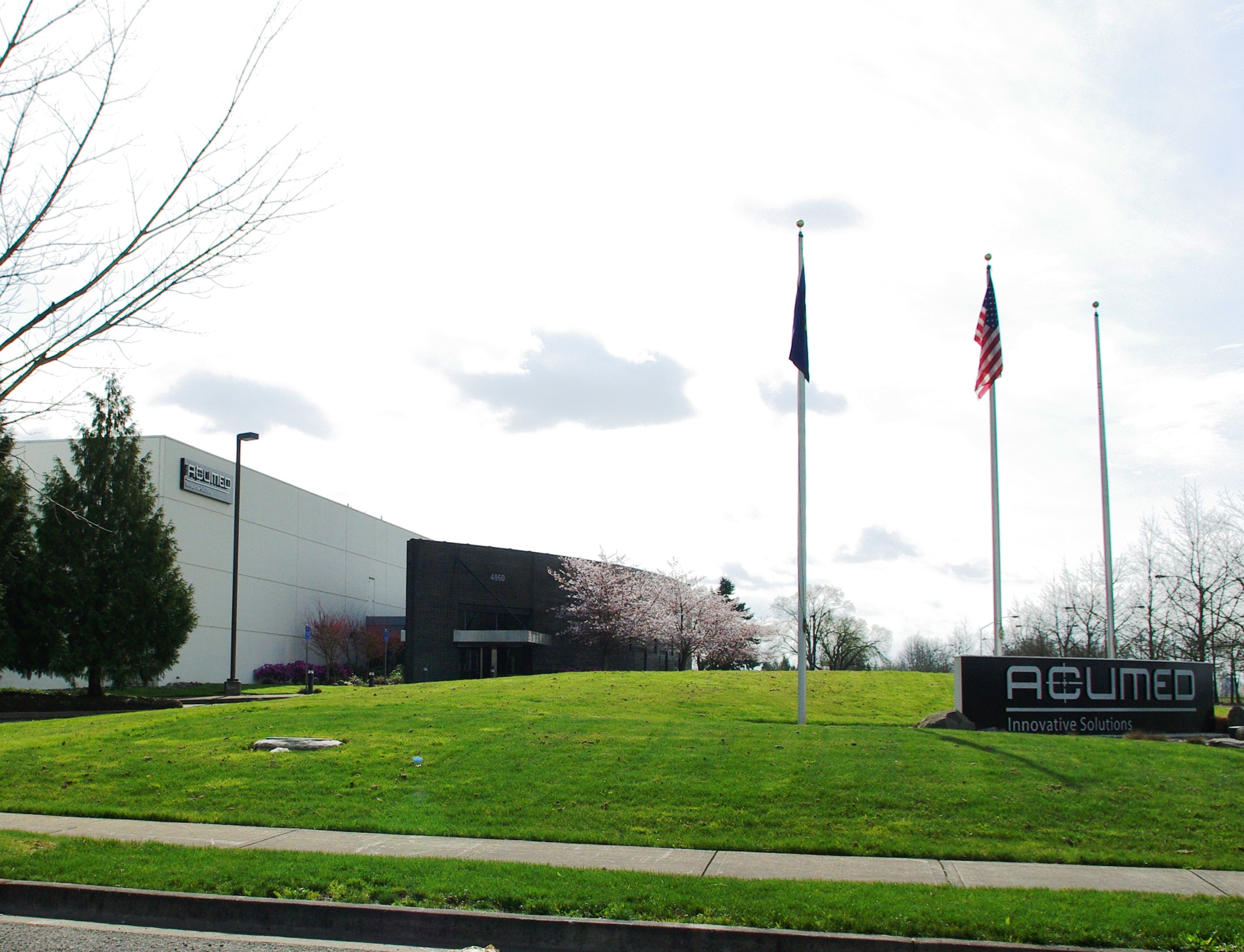
The company's facility on Brookwood Parkway in Hillsboro, Oregon

In 2007, machinists at the company built a custom motorcycle that the company approved of as a marketing tool. Costing $20,000 to build, the blue-colored motorcycle featured the company's logo and products, but was not street legal. The bike's unique features included titanium humeral stems sold by Acumed and used on the motorcycle as the clutch lever and hand brake. As of October 2004, Acumed employed 130 people at its facilities in Oregon, which totaled 55,000 square feet (5,100 m^{2}) in space. That year the company announced plans to expand by adding 37,000 square feet (3,400 m^{2}) to their existing facility in Hillsboro and hire an additional 140 employees over five years. The expansion was estimated to cost nearly $23 million, with $200,000 coming from the state of Oregon's Strategic Reserve Fund in the form of working training.

In November 2009, the company purchased a 52,807-square-foot (4,905.9 m^{2}) building and 9 acres (3.6 ha) of land located along Brookwood Parkway in Hillsboro for $4.9 million. The building had been used by Hansen Architectural Systems Inc., with Acumed purchasing the building for a planned expansion of their business while keeping their headquarters off Cornelius Pass Road. At that time, Acumed employed 295 people and sold products in 30 countries.

Alan Kozlowski stepped down as company president in 2008 and was replaced by David Jensen. Jensen left the company in July 2013. Acumed appointed Robert Johnson as president in September 2013.

== Products ==
Acumed designs and builds orthopedic medical devices that are implanted into patients, as well as surgical devices. Implant products are used for reconstruction and repair from trauma injuries. These include screws and plates that attach to feet, ankles, fingers, arms, and shoulders. The products are manufactured at Acumed's Hillsboro facility.

== See also ==
- List of companies based in Oregon
