= Osteomed =

Medical device manufacturer

OsteoMed L.P., formerly known as OsteoMed Corporation, is a medical device manufacturer specializing in craniofacial titanium fixation, small bone drills and saws, and a variety of implantable devices used in foot and ankle surgery. OsteoMed's focus is on neurosurgery, reconstructive plastic surgery, oral surgery, podiatry, and foot and ankle orthopedics.

OsteoMed was founded in 1990 in Glendale, California by Rick Buss, a medical device sales representative, and Jim Lafferty, a medical device engineer. The company was founded on the principle of close collaboration between the company and doctors, with products made to their specifications. In the mid-1990s OsteoMed relocated to Addison, TX, seeking a more central location for product distribution.

In 1999, after the company had grown, Buss and Lafferty sold OsteoMed Corporation to the Marmon Group, a privately held conglomerate owned solely by the Pritzker family of Chicago, Illinois. In the turmoil following the death of Jay Pritzker, his brother Robert Pritzker spun off sole possession of OsteoMed (among others) into his private holding company, Colson Associates.
