= Harry Nicholas Pritzker =

American businessman (1892–1956)

- Born: August 1, 1892
- Died: August 8, 1956 (aged 64); Highland Park, Illinois, US
- Occupations: Attorney; Real estate investor
- Spouse: Elna Stone
- Children: 2
- Family: Jack Nicholas Pritzker (brother); Abram Nicholas Pritzker (brother); See Pritzker family

Harry Nicholas Pritzker (August 1, 1892 – August 8, 1956) was an American businessman and member of the Pritzker family.

== Early life and education ==
Harry was the son of Ukrainian Jewish immigrants Annie P. (née Cohn) and Nicholas J. Pritzker. His father left Kyiv for Chicago in 1881 and worked first as a pharmacist and, after graduating from DePaul University College of Law, as a lawyer. His father wrote a small book that has been passed down from Pritzker to Pritzker; the theme of the book is "Your only immortality is the impact you have on your successors."

== Career ==
Harry joined his father's law firm, Pritzker & Pritzker, along with his brothers, Abram and Jack. Harry specialized in criminal law, Abram (called Abe and later A. N.) specialized in business law, and Jack in real estate law. In the 1930s, he supported his brothers who left the firm and invested in real estate and small companies mostly in the Chicago area. Harry continued to run the law firm Pritzker & Pritzker which eventually became an in-house firm catering solely to the needs of the Pritzker family and its business. The Pritzker brothers were very successful and amassed a considerable fortune. Using Pritzker & Pritzker, they shielded their earnings from taxes through a series of trusts and tax code loopholes enabling them to distribute their earnings as they chose.

His brother Abram's sons continued to grow the family business eventually buying the Hyatt House hotel in Los Angeles in 1957 forming the cornerstone of their hotel chain. His nephew Robert created a conglomerate of a multitude of manufacturing companies which grew into the multibillion-dollar Marmon Group. Marmon was diversified to include manufacturing concerns ranging from lumber to railroad box cars and travel industry staples. It composed half of the family's wealth. On December 25, 2007, it was announced that Warren Buffett, through Berkshire Hathaway, would purchase 60% of the Marmon Group from the Pritzkers for $4.5 billion.

== Personal life ==
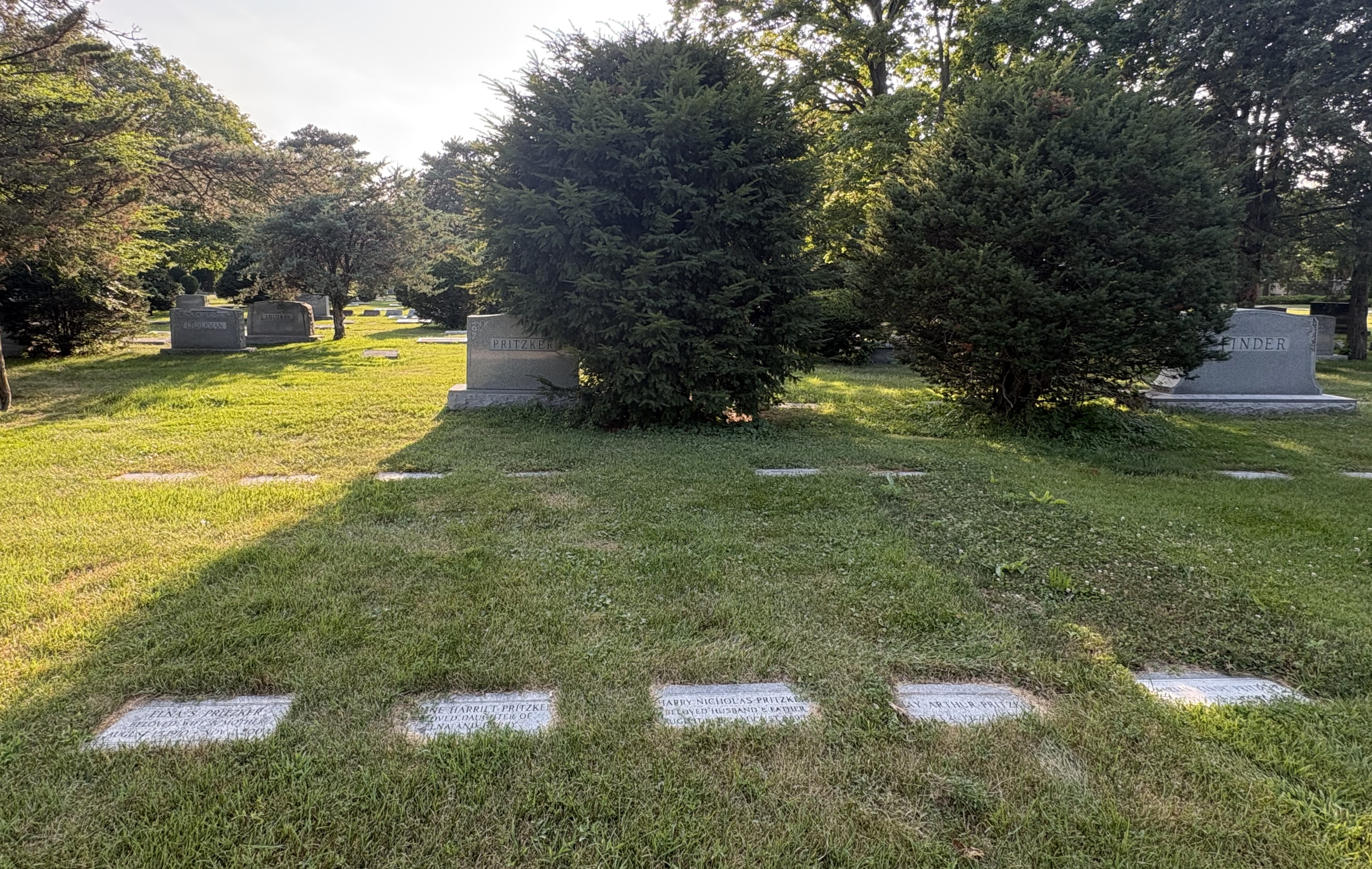
Pritzker's grave (front row, third from left) at Memorial Park Cemetery

Pritzker was married to Elna Stone; they had two children: Richard S. Pritzker (born 1944) and Joanne Pritzker (1946–1955). His son Richard is a real estate investor in California and had previously worked as head counsel at the Hyatt Corporation.

Harry Nicholas Pritzker died in Highland Park on August 8, 1956, and was buried at Memorial Park Cemetery in Skokie.
