= Karen Pritzker =

American business executive, investor, film producer, philanthropist, billionaire heiress

- Born: 1958 (age 67–68); Oberlin, Ohio, U.S.
- Education: Northwestern University (BA)
- Occupations: Investor, philanthropist, film producer
- Spouse: Michael Vlock (died 2017) Daniel Mark Schwartz (married abt 1985 - divorce)
- Children: 4
- Parent: Robert Pritzker (father)
- Relatives: See Pritzker family

Karen L. Pritzker (born 1958) is an American documentary film producer, investor, and philanthropist. She is a member of the Pritzker family, the granddaughter of A.N. Pritzker and daughter of Robert Pritzker.

== Early life and education ==
Pritzker was born in Oberlin, Ohio, the daughter of Audrey (née Gilbert) and Robert Pritzker. She has two full siblings: Jennifer N. Pritzker (b. 1950), a retired Lt Colonel in the Illinois State National Guard and founder of the Pritzker Military Library, and Linda Pritzker (b. 1953), an American lama in the Tibetan Buddhist tradition. Her parents divorced in 1979. In 1980, her father married Irene Dryburgh; their children are Matthew Pritzker and Liesel Pritzker Simmons. The following year, her mother married Albert B. Ratner, co-chairman of Cleveland-based real estate developer Forest City Enterprises.

Pritzker graduated with a B.A. from Northwestern University.

== Career ==
Pritzker was an editor at the magazine Working Mother before the family sold it in 1986 and has written for various publications including Success, Seventeen, Kirkus Reviews, and Newsday. Pritzker operates a venture fund, LaunchCapital LLC with a core focus in the technology, consumer and medical businesses.

In 2012, Pritzker co-founded KPJR Films with James Redford. She has since executive-produced three documentary film features: The Big Picture: Rethinking Dyslexia, Paper Tigers, and Resilience: The Biology of Stress and The Science of Hope.

Pritzker, alongside her husband, Michael Vlock, and Elon Boms, founded LaunchCapital in 2008, a seed-stage investment firm.

=== Filmography ===
Year	Title	Role	Notes
2012	The Big Picture: Rethinking Dyslexia	Executive Producer	Sundance Film selection in 2012 and winner of a 2013 Parent’s Choice Award
2015	Paper Tigers	Executive Producer	Seattle International Film Festival selection in 2015
2016	Resilience	Executive Producer	Shown at the Sundance Film Festival in 2016

== Philanthropy ==
Pritzker is president and director of The Seedlings Foundation, founded in 2002, which has given millions of dollars in grants to catalyze advancements in medical research, social services, job retraining, affordable housing, and online news sites dedicated to local, factual, ad-free reporting. Pritzker and her husband donated $20 million to the Yale University School of Medicine. (including $3 million to endow a professorship); $5 million to Teach for America; $1.5 million to the Michael J. Fox Foundation for Parkinson's Research, in honor of her father who had Parkinson's disease. In 2007, Pritzker donated $1 million to build a new visitor center at the Treblinka concentration camp. Pritzer funded a new website named Truth in Advertising (TinA), tina.org, that provides information about incidents of false advertising. She is on the board of directors of Grameen America, a nonprofit that offers low-cost microloans to women below the poverty line, as well as Grameen PrimaCare, which provides affordable health care for immigrant women.

Pritzker co-founded The My Hero Project with Rita Stern Milch and Jeanne Meyers in 1995. The purpose of the effort is to "celebrate the best of humanity and empowers young people to realize their own potential to effect positive change in the world".

== Personal life ==
Pritzker was married to Daniel Mark Schwartz, with whom she has two daughters. She then married to Michael Vlock, with whom she has two more children. Her husband died in September 2017. She lives in Branford, Connecticut.
