= Pritzker School =

Pritzker School may refer to:

== Higher education ==
- Pritzker School of Law, Northwestern University, in downtown Chicago, Illinois
- Pritzker School of Medicine, the University of Chicago
- Pritzker School of Molecular Engineering, the University of Chicago

== Secondary and basic education ==
- Pritzker College Prep, a public secondary school in Chicago, Illinois
- A.N. Pritzker School, a public K–8 school in Chicago, Illinois
