= Blue Haven Initiative =

U.S. impact investment organization

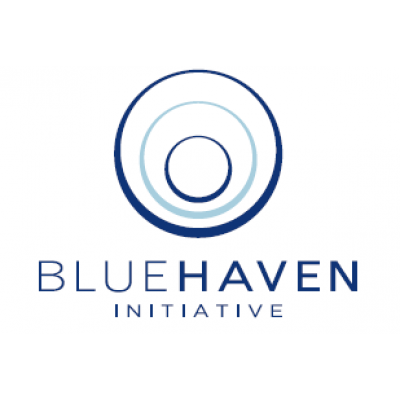
- Type: Private
- Industry: Venture Capital, Impact Investing
- Founded: 2012
- Founder: Liesel Pritzker Simmons; Ian Simmons
- Headquarters: Cambridge, Massachusetts, United States
- Area served: United States; Sub-Saharan Africa
- Key people: Liesel Pritzker Simmons (Principal); Ian Simmons (Principal)
- Website: bluehaveninitiative.com

Blue Haven Initiative (BHI) is an impact investment organization based in the United States and is one of the largest investment funds in the world dedicated solely to impact investing. Blue Haven's venture capital fund invests in early-stage, innovative businesses that improve standards of living, create economic opportunity and deliver products and services cleanly and efficiently to underserved communities in Sub-Saharan Africa.

== Structure ==
=== Public markets ===
Blue Haven invests in both public equities and fixed income investments. The firm seeks to increase the impact of these asset classes through a combination of quantitative scoring and a qualitative assessment of the use of proceeds for underlying issuers.

=== Direct investments ===
Blue Haven's venture capital fund enables early-stage, innovative businesses that improve standards of living, create economic opportunity and deliver products and services cleanly and efficiently to underserved communities in sub-Saharan Africa. It sources direct investments that are off the radar for most U.S.-based venture capital investors by finding and engaging entrepreneurs and growing its financial commitment over time. A key area of focus is sub-Saharan Africa, a region that it believes provides opportunities for impact and financial returns.

It invests on average $100,000 to $10 million from seed to Series C in profitable companies, nonprofit organizations and new ventures, investing across sectors including affordable and green real estate, education, energy, environment, financial inclusion, and health.

Notable investments include:

- CrossBoundary
- Umati
- PEGAfrica
- Karibu Homes

== Key people ==
Blue Haven was founded by Liesel Pritzker Simmons and her husband Ian Simmons in 2012.

== See also ==
- Impact investing
- ACCION International
- Omidyar Network
- LeapFrog Investments
- Pritzker family
