= Robert Pritzker =

American businessman (1926–2011)

- Born: Robert Alan Pritzker; June 30, 1926; Chicago, Illinois, U.S.
- Died: October 27, 2011 (aged 85)
- Education: Illinois Institute of Technology
- Occupation: Businessman
- Spouses: Audrey Frances Gilbert (m. 1948; div. 1979) Irene Dryburgh (m. 1980; div. 1989) Sao Mayari Sargent (m. 1994)
- Children: Jennifer; Linda; Karen; Matthew; Liesel
- Parent: Abram Nicholas Pritzker (father)
- Relatives: Pritzker family

Robert Alan Pritzker (June 30, 1926 – October 27, 2011) was an American businessman and member of the wealthy Pritzker family.

== Biography ==
Pritzker was born to a Jewish family, the Pritzker family, in Chicago, Illinois, the son of Fanny (née Doppelt) and A.N. Pritzker. He has two brothers: Donald Pritzker and Jay Pritzker. Robert Pritzker received a bachelor's degree in industrial engineering from the Illinois Institute of Technology in 1946 and an honorary doctorate in 1984. He taught night courses at IIT and began serving on the board of trustees in 1962, and served as a University Regent until the time of his death. He also taught evening classes at the University of Chicago Graduate School of Business (now the Booth School of Business) in the late 1970s and through the 1980s. His class consisted of cases developed from actual business take-overs he was involved with, and students had to recommend whether or not to purchase the companies under study. Pritzker started The Marmon Group, an international association of autonomous manufacturing and service companies. Marmon's assets constitute half of the Pritzker family fortune. Robert's success can be partially attributed to his unique business structure, in which employees are trusted to make more key decisions, independent of the central office, than in other typical manufacturing settings. This independence allows for more creativity, and increases speed and productivity. Concurrently, Pritzker spent a year as Chairman of the National Association of Manufacturers.

In 2002, Bob Pritzker retired from his position of President of The Marmon Group and assumed the role of President of Colson Associates, Inc., a holding company of caster, plastics moldling, hardware and medical companies, including Acumed, Osteomed, and Precision Edge Surgical Products Company, among others.

== Personal life ==
Pritzker was married three times:

- His first wife was Audrey Frances Gilbert, whom he married on December 19, 1948 and divorced in 1979. In 1981, she married again to Albert B. Ratner, the co-chairman of Cleveland-based real estate developer Forest City Enterprises. Pritzker and Gilbert had three children:
  - Jennifer N. Pritzker (b. James, 1950) – retired Lt Colonel in the U.S. Army and founder of the Pritzker Military Library. Jennifer has three children: daughter Tal Hava Pritzker and sons Andrew and William.
  - Linda Pritzker (b. 1953) – psychotherapist and ordained Tibetan Buddhist lama.
  - Karen Pritzker Vlock (b. 1958) – married to investor Michael Vlock.
- In 1980, he married Australian Irene Dryburgh, whom he met while she worked at a Hyatt hotel in Australia. Prior to their divorce in 1989, they had two children:
  - Matthew Pritzker (b. 1982) – is a real-estate entrepreneur, the head of the Matthew Pritzker Company, former owner of Chicago-based HomeMade Pizza Company, and State Street Pictures.
  - Liesel Pritzker Simmons (b. 1984) – a child actress who starred in A Little Princess and played the U.S. President's daughter in the film Air Force One. She co-founded with her mother the IDP Foundation, dedicated to "developing innovative, scalable and replicable programs through sustainable initiatives that move away from aid based models and lead to greater progress in the achievement of Education for All for the most deprived."
- His third wife, whom he married in 1994, was Sao Mayari Sargent, the daughter of the Austrian author Inge Sargent (née Eberhard), and her first husband Sao Kya Seng, last Saopha of Hsipaw State in Shan State, Burma.

Robert Pritzker preferred to fly coach despite having access to a family-owned corporate jet: "If I ask my managers to go coach how can I go first class? That's leadership."

Pritzker received the Golden Plate Award of the American Academy of Achievement in 1983.

Pritzker's nephew and namesake, J. B., was elected Governor of Illinois in 2018.

== See also ==
- The World's Billionaires
