= Jack Nicholas Pritzker =

American businessman (1904–1979)

- Born: January 6, 1904; Chicago, Illinois, US
- Died: October 30, 1979 (aged 75); Chicago, Illinois, US
- Education: DePaul University; Northwestern University
- Occupations: Attorney; Real estate investor
- Spouse: Rhoda Goldberg
- Children: Nicholas J. Pritzker
- Parent(s): Annie P. Cohn; Nicholas J. Pritzker
- Family: Abram Nicholas Pritzker (brother); Harry Nicholas Pritzker (brother)

Jack Nicholas Pritzker (January 6, 1904 – October 30, 1979) was an American businessman and member of the Pritzker family.

== Early life and education ==
Pritzker was the son of Ukrainian Jewish immigrants Annie P. (née Cohn) and Nicholas J. Pritzker. His father left Kyiv for Chicago in 1881 and worked as a pharmacist. After graduating from DePaul University College of Law, he worked as a lawyer. Jack Pritzker graduated from the University of Michigan in 1925 and Northwestern University School of Law in 1927. His father wrote a small book that has been passed down from Pritzker to Pritzker; the theme of the book is "Your only immortality is the impact you have on your successors."

== Career ==
Pritzker joined his father's law firm, Pritzker & Pritzker, along with his brothers, Abram and Harry. Harry specialized in criminal law, Abram (called Abe and later A. N.) in business law, and Jack in real estate law. In the 1930s, he left the law practice and branched out with his brother Abram investing in real estate and small companies mostly in the Chicago area. Harry continued to run the law firm which eventually became an in-house firm catering solely to the needs of the Pritzker family and its business. The Pritzker brothers were very successful and amassed a considerable fortune. Using Pritzker & Pritzker, they shielded their earnings from taxes through a series of trusts and tax code loopholes enabling them to distribute their earnings as they chose.

His brother Abram's sons continued to grow the family business eventually buying the Hyatt House hotel in Los Angeles in 1957 forming the cornerstone of their hotel chain. His nephew Robert created a conglomerate of a multitude of manufacturing companies which grew into the multibillion-dollar Marmon Group. Marmon was diversified to include manufacturing concerns ranging from lumber to railroad box cars and travel industry staples. It composed half of the family's wealth. On December 25, 2007, it was announced that Warren Buffett, through Berkshire Hathaway, would purchase 60% of the Marmon Group from the Pritzkers for $4.5 billion.

== Personal life ==
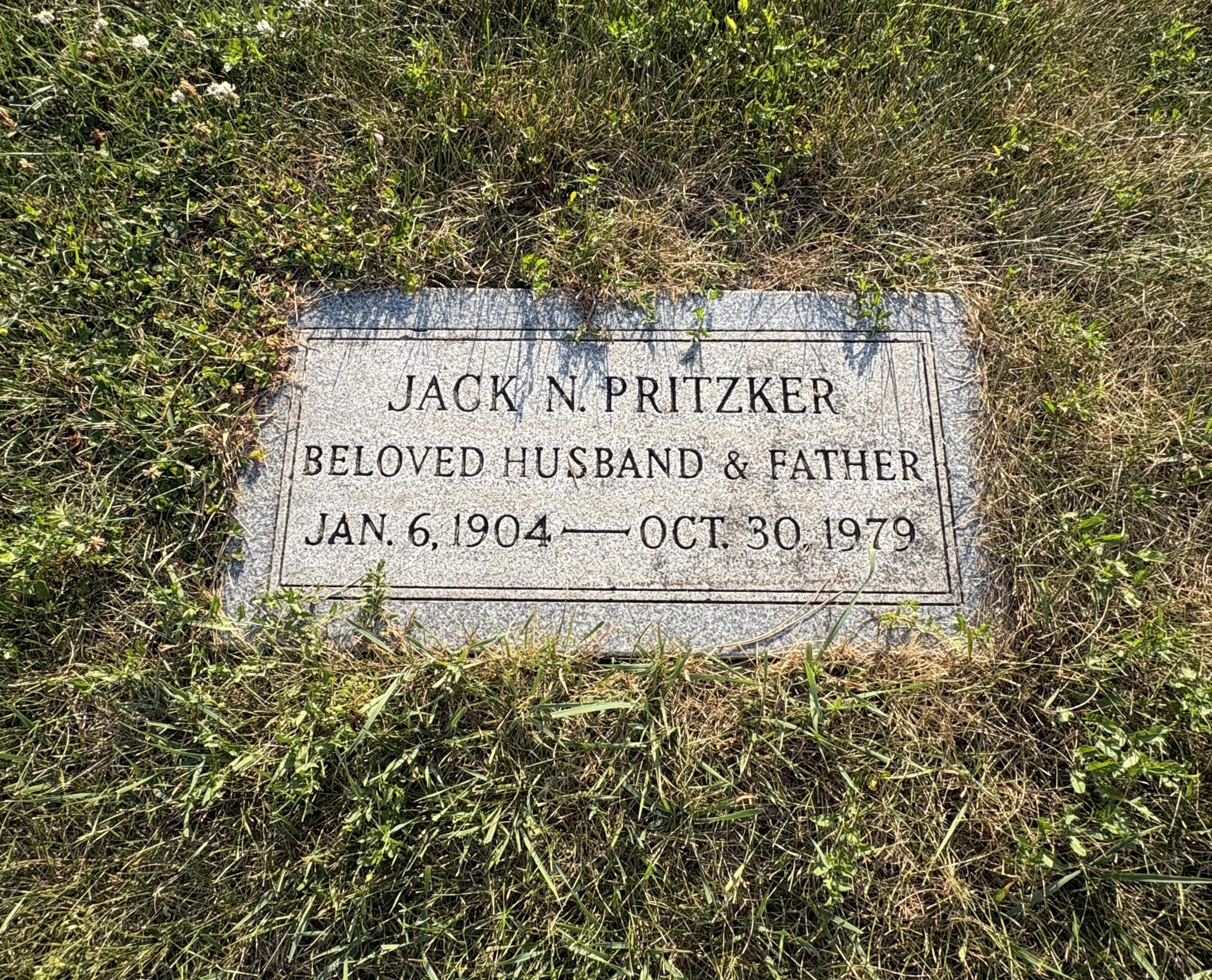
Pritzker's grave at Memorial Park Cemetery

Pritzker was married to Rhoda Goldberg; they had one child: Nicholas J. Pritzker who is chairman of the board and CEO of the Hyatt Development Corporation.

Jack Nicholas Pritzker died at Michael Reese Hospital in Chicago on October 30, 1979, and was buried at Memorial Park Cemetery in Skokie.
