= Liesel Pritzker Simmons =

American actress, philanthropist

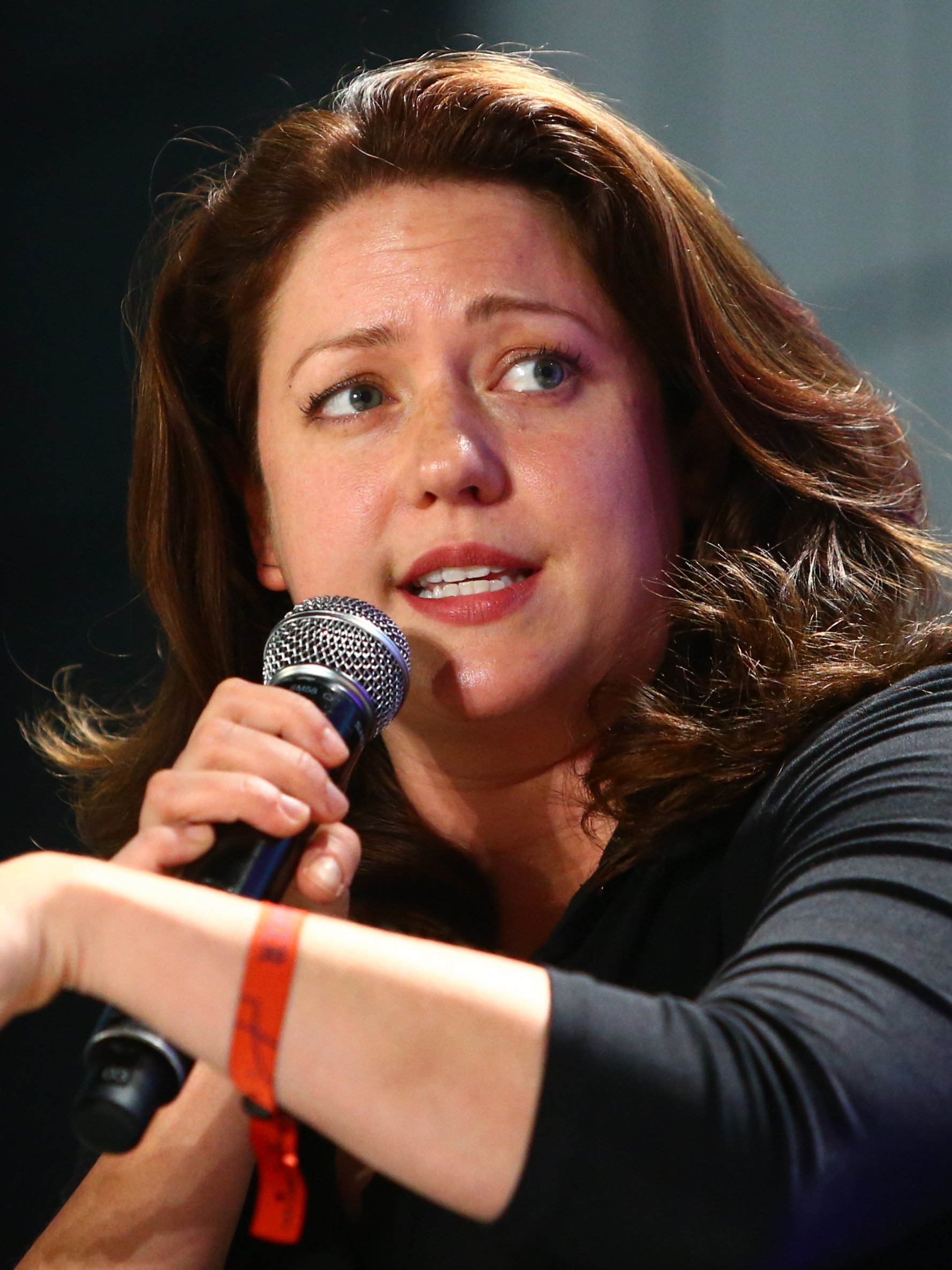
- Pritzker in 2019
- Born: Liesel Anne Pritzker; March 14, 1984 (age 42); Chicago, Illinois, U.S.
- Other name: Liesel Matthews (stage name)
- Education: Columbia University (BA)
- Occupations: Investor, Philanthropist, Impact investor, former actress
- Years active: 1995–2000
- Spouse: Ian Simmons
- Children: 2
- Parent: Robert Pritzker (father)
- Relatives: Pritzker family JB Pritzker (cousin)

Liesel Pritzker Simmons (born Liesel Anne Pritzker), stage name Liesel Matthews, is an American heiress and former child actress. She starred as Sara Crewe in A Little Princess, a 1995 film adaptation of the Frances Hodgson Burnett classic, and as Alice Marshall in Air Force One. She is a member of the wealthy Pritzker family. She is now known as a leader in impact investing and founded the Blue Haven Initiative in 2012 to that end.

== Early life and education ==
Pritzker was born on March 14, 1984 in Chicago, Illinois, into the Pritzker family, the daughter of Irene (née Dryburgh) and Robert Pritzker. She is of Jewish origin on her father's side. Her mother, an Australian citizen, met her father while working at a Pritzker-owned Hyatt hotel in Australia; they married in 1980 and divorced in 1989.

Liesel Pritzker has one brother, Matthew Pritzker, and three half-siblings from her father's first marriage to Audrey Gilbert Pritzker: Jennifer N. Pritzker, Linda Pritzker, and Karen Pritzker Vlock. She was named after the Sound of Music character Liesl von Trapp, the eldest daughter of the seven von Trapp children.

Pritzker graduated from New Trier High School outside of Chicago and enrolled at Columbia University, from which she graduated in 2006.

Her father founded The Marmon Group with his brother Jay Pritzker. She is one of twelve surviving grandchildren of patriarch A.N. Pritzker, a financier and industrialist who died in 1986. Her uncle, Jay Pritzker, is the founder of the Hyatt Hotel chain, and owned Braniff Airlines from 1983 to 1988. Her cousin is J. B. Pritzker, the 43rd Governor of Illinois. The family controls the TransUnion Credit Bureau and the Royal Caribbean Cruise Lines. The Pritzker family has been near the top of Forbes magazine's "America's Richest Families" list since the list began in 1982.

== Acting career ==
Liesel Pritzker uses the name "Liesel Matthews" as an actress on stage and screen, first to honor her brother Matthew, and second to avoid conflict between her divorced parents about whether she should incorporate her stepfather's name and be known as Liesel Pritzker-Bagley.

Pritzker made her professional stage debut as Scout in a production of To Kill A Mockingbird in Chicago. She won a Theatre World Award for her performance in Vincent in Brixton. She starred in two major films, Alfonso Cuaron's A Little Princess and Wolfgang Petersen's 1997 action thriller Air Force One.

In 2002, Pritzker played the character Jenn in Neil LaBute's play The Distance from Here at the Almeida Theatre at King's Cross in London, England with Enrico Colantoni, Ana Reeder, Amy Ryan, Jason Ritter, and Mark Webber in the cast. David Leveaux was director.

== Lawsuit ==
In 2002, Pritzker, then a first-year student at Columbia University, filed a $6 billion lawsuit against her father and eleven older cousins, claiming they had misappropriated money from trusts established for her and her brother Matthew Pritzker. In early 2005, the parties settled the lawsuit, which followed another suit that had begun the process of splitting the family fortune eleven ways. That result placed eleven Pritzkers into the Forbes 400, the most from any single family. Under the settlement, Liesel and Matthew each received roughly US$280 million in cash and were given more control over other trusts valued at about US$170 million each.

== Philanthropy and projects ==
Liesel Pritzker is the founder of Young Ambassadors for Opportunity (YAO), a network of young professionals who aim to involve others in microfinance and the work of Opportunity International. In June 2009, she donated $4 million to Opportunity International to help expand microfinance services in Africa. She is the co-founder of the IDP Foundation, Inc. and Blue Haven Initiative.

== Personal life ==
Pritzker is married to Ian Simmons; they live in Greater Boston with their two daughters.

== Filmography ==
Year	Title	Role	Notes
1995	A Little Princess	Sara Crewe	Nominated – Young Artist Awards for Best Young Leading Actress in a Feature Film
1997	Air Force One	Alice Marshall	
2000	Blast	Jessie 'Ears'	
