= Nicholas J. Pritzker =

American businessman

- Born: October 16, 1945 (age 80); Chicago, Illinois, U.S.
- Education: Reed College; Lake Forest College; London Film School; University of Chicago
- Occupations: Businessman; Philanthropist
- Spouse: Susan Stowell
- Children: 4
- Parent(s): Jack Nicholas Pritzker; Rhoda Pritzker
- Relatives: See Pritzker family

Nicholas J. Pritzker (born October 16, 1945) is an American real estate and venture entrepreneur in San Francisco, California. He served as the Chairman of the board and CEO of the Hyatt Development Corporation. He is a member of the wealthy Pritzker family, who owned chewing-tobacco giant Conwood before selling it to Reynolds American.

== Early life and education ==
Pritzker was born in Chicago on 16 October 1945, son of Jack Nicholas Pritzker (1903-1979) and Rhoda Goldberg Pritzker (1914-2007). He attended Reed College, Lake Forest College and the London School of Film. He went on to receive a J.D. from the University of Chicago.

== Career ==
Pritzker assumed responsibility of Hyatt Hotels Corporation in Chicago, Illinois after working with his father, Jack Pritzker, in real estate. He served as the president of the company and oversaw international hotel projects. Pritzker also served on Hyatt Hotel Corporation's board of directors from 1980 to 2007. He is an independent entrepreneur and co-founder of Tao Capital. The investment firm primarily invests in sustainable energy and disruptive technology businesses. Tao Capital's early investments include Tesla Motors, Uber, SpaceX, Twist Bioscience, Aquion Energy, Atlantica Hotels, United Record Pressing and Foundations Recovery Network. Pritzker is on the board of JUUL Labs since 2017, an electronic cigarette company.

== Philanthropy ==
He has served on various non-profit boards including as Vice Chairman of Conservation International, Chairman of the Grand Victoria Foundation, Vice Chairman of Clean Energy Trust, and Chairman of the Libra Foundation.

== Personal life ==
Pritzker is married to Susan Stowell Pritzker and they have four children. They live in Nicasio, California.
