= Matthew Pritzker =

American heir

- Born: May 28, 1982 (age 44)
- Education: American University
- Occupation: Heir
- Organization(s): Matthew Pritzker Company (chairman and founder)
- Parent: Robert Pritzker (father)
- Relatives: Pritzker family; Liesel Pritzker Simmons (sister)

Matthew Pritzker (born May 28, 1982) is an American heir based in Chicago, Illinois. In 2008 he founded the Matthew Pritzker Company. The company's focus is on investing Pritzker's inheritance in real estate, technology, media, consumer, and manufacturing. Pritzker supports a number of local and national charities and institutions.

== Early life and education ==
Matthew Pritzker was born May 28, 1982 to Irene Pritzker (née Dryburgh) and Robert Pritzker of the Pritzker family. His American family is engaged in business and philanthropy. He grew up in Chicago, Illinois, and is an alumnus of New Trier High School. He attended American University. He has one sister, former child actress Liesel Pritzker Simmons, and three half-siblings from his father's first marriage to Audrey Gilbert Pritzker: Jennifer N. Pritzker, Linda Pritzker, and Karen Pritzker Vlock.

== Career ==
In 2008, following a series of successful real estate investments, he formed The Matthew Pritzker Company. The company focuses on building businesses across a variety of industries—including real estate, technology, media, consumer, and manufacturing. Crain's Chicago Business named Pritzker to their “40 under 40” list of businesspeople, when he was 29.

The Matthew Pritzker Company has a portfolio of investments in companies such as cameo, SpaceX, Fairgrounds Craft Coffee & Tea, and Blaze Pizza, as well as continued investments in real estate. In 2012 Pritzker bought a stake in the Colson Group, a caster manufacturing company that his father Robert Pritzker had helped build decades earlier.

== Civic engagement ==
Pritzker supports a number of civic and philanthropic initiatives in Chicago and the United States. He is the benefactor of The Mathew Pritzker Enchanted Forest, a network of pathways and play areas within Maggie Daley Park in Chicago. Pritzker serves on the Board of After School All Stars.

== Lawsuit ==
After family patriarch Jay Pritzker died in 1999, the extended Pritzker family began restructuring the family's businesses and assets. In the course of that process, issues came to light which Pritzker's younger sister, Liesel, raised in a lawsuit against certain trustees, advisers, and beneficiaries. Pritzker eventually joined his sister's lawsuit, which the parties successfully resolved two years later. In January 2005, the press speculated that Pritzker received about $500 million in a settlement agreement.

== Political activity ==
Pritzker is active in politics and has donated to many Democratic candidates for local, state, and federal office.

== Personal life ==
Pritzker lives in Chicago's Lincoln Park neighborhood. He has a private pilot's license.
