= Linda Pritzker =

American lama and billionaire heiress

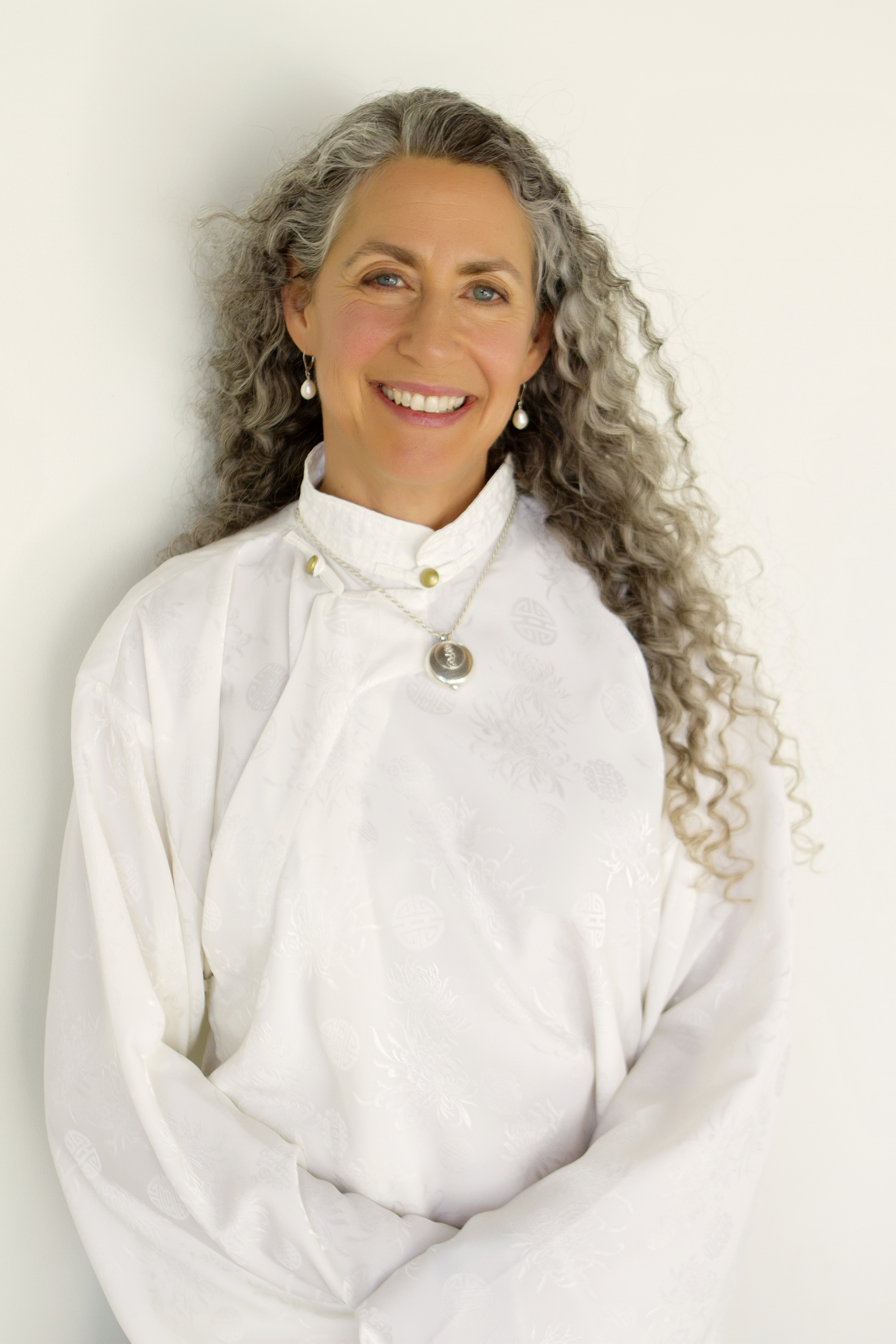
- Linda Pritzker (Lama Tsomo) in 2014
- Born: September 1953 (age 73); Oberlin, Ohio, U.S.
- Other name: Lama Tsomo
- Occupations: Tibetan lama, author
- Children: 3, including Rachel
- Parent: Robert Pritzker (father)
- Relatives: Pritzker family

Linda Pritzker (born September 1953), also known as Lama Tsomo, is an American lama in the Tibetan Buddhist tradition. She is a spiritual teacher, author, philanthropist, and co-founder of the Namchak Foundation and Namchak Retreat Ranch in Missoula, Montana. An heiress of the Pritzker family, her net worth was estimated at $2.2 billion in October 2026.

== Early life ==
Pritzker was born September 1953 in Oberlin, Ohio, the second of three children of Jewish-American businessman Robert Pritzker and Audrey Gilbert. She has two full siblings: Jennifer N. Pritzker (b. James, 1950), a retired lieutenant colonel in the U.S. Army and founder of the Pritzker Military Library, and Karen Pritzker (b. 1958).

Her parents divorced in 1979. In 1980, her father married Irene Dryburgh; their children are Matthew Pritzker and Liesel Pritzker Simmons. The following year, her mother married Albert B. Ratner, co-chairman of Cleveland-based real estate developer Forest City Enterprises.

== Career ==
After earning a master's degree in Counseling Psychology and working as a psychotherapist for several years, Pritzker began a spiritual path to Tibetan Buddhism. In 1995, she began studying with Tibetan meditation master Tulku Sangak Rinpoche and became fluent in Tibetan. Rinpoche is world holder of the Namchak Lineage, a branch of the Nyingma path of Tibetan Buddhism.

Pritzker was ordained a lama in February 2005 by Rinpoche. ABC News' Dan Harris documented Lama Tsomo's journey to Buddhist practices in his podcast 10% Happier.

Pritzker's work revolves around the initiatives of the Namchak Foundation, including the Namchak Retreat Ranch, which offers in-person retreats, online courses and guided meditations for students at all levels from beginners to advanced practitioners.

== Publications ==
Lama Tsomo is author of the Ancient Wisdom for our Times Tibetan Buddhist Practice Series, including Book 1: Why Bother: An Introduction, Book 2: Wisdom and Compassion (Starting with Yourself), and Book 3: Deepening Wisdom, Deepening Connection.

Lama Tsomo also wrote Why is the Dalai Lama Always Smiling? A Westerner's Introduction and Guide to Tibetan Buddhist Practice. The foreword was written by the Dalai Lama and won a silver medal in the 2016 Independent Publisher Book Awards (IPPY Awards).

Other books by Lama Tsomo include The Princess Who Wept Pearls: The Feminine Journey in Fairy Tales. She co-authored The Lotus & The Rose: A Conversation Between Tibetan Buddhism & Mystical Christianity and was a contributor to The Dharma of Dogs: Our Best Friends as Spiritual Teachers edited by Tami Simon.

== Personal life ==
Pritzker is divorced and has three children: Rachel, Roland, and Rosemary.

== Publications ==
- Deepening Wisdom, Deepening Connection (Ancient Wisdom for Our Times Tibetan Buddhist Practice Series)
- Wisdom and Compassion (Starting with Yourself) (Ancient Wisdom for Our Times Tibetan Buddhist Practice Series)
- Why Bother?: An Introduction (Ancient Wisdom for Our Times Tibetan Buddhist Practice Series)
- Why is the Dalai Lama Always Smiling? A Westerner's Introduction and Guide to Tibetan Buddhist Practice
- The Lotus & The Rose: A Conversation Between Tibetan Buddhism & Mystical Christianity, co-author with Matthew Fox
- The Dharma of Dogs: Our Best Friends as Spiritual Teachers, contributing author, edited by Tami Simon
- The Princess Who Wept Pearls: The Feminine Journey in Fairy Tales
- "10% Happier with Dan Harris" Podcast, August 2017
- "Metta Hour with Sharon Salzberg" Podcast, October 2018
- "Buddha at the Gas Pump" Podcast, May 2018
- "The Secular Buddhist" Podcast, June 2016
- "Synchronicity podcast" May 2016
- "Ani Tsering Wangmo: A Life of Merit" in Lion's Roar Newsletter, March 2010.
- "Coming Home" in Originally Blessed. Oakland, CA: Creation Spirituality Communities, 2008.
- "Dharmasala" in Lion's Roar Newsletter, August 2007.
- "Shedra" in Lion's Roar Newsletter, February 2006.
