= Rachel Pritzker =

American heiress and activist

- Occupation: Heiress
- Political party: Democratic
- Movement: Ecomodernism, center-left politics
- Board member of: Third Way; Breakthrough Institute; Pritzker Innovation Fund
- Mother: Linda Pritzker
- Family: Pritzker

Rachel Pritzker is an American heiress of the Pritzker family fortune. A member of the Democratic Party, she is the chair of Third Way, the Breakthrough Institute, and the Pritzker Innovation Fund.

One of three children of Linda Pritzker, she was a founding board member of Media Matters of America and the Democracy Alliance. She is an advocate of ecomodernism and center-left politics.
