= Rhoda Pritzker =

British-born American philanthropist

Rhoda Pritzker (née Goldberg; September 11, 1914 – December 23, 2007) was a British-born American philanthropist. She was a member of the Pritzker family, one of the wealthiest families in Chicago, through her marriage to lawyer and businessman, Jack Nicholas Pritzker. The Pritzker family founded the Hyatt hotel chain during the 1950s.

== Personal life ==
Rhoda Pritzker was born Rhoda Goldberg in 1914 to Jewish parents in Manchester, England. Her parents were Morris Goldberg, a Gilbert and Sullivan circus performer, and Cissie Goldberg, a concert pianist. She did not begin her schooling until she was ten years old due to a case of tuberculosis. She dropped out before completing high school in order to take a position with a newspaper in Southport, Lancashire. She also worked for a number of other British newspapers and the British Broadcasting Corporation at a young age.

Goldberg immigrated to the United States in 1939 on one of the last trans-Atlantic passenger ship convoys before the full outbreak of World War II. Pritzker family lore claims that she wore her life preserver throughout the entire length of the voyage due to the constant threat of German U-boat attack. She initially took a job as a blackjack dealer in Reno, Nevada, as part of an assignment for a magazine before landing a position in New York City as a foreign correspondent for The Associated Press of Great Britain during World War II.

Goldberg met her future husband, Jack Nicholas Pritzker, on a blind date in Manhattan. The couple were married in 1943, shortly after Jack entered the U.S. Navy as a lieutenant, junior grade during World War II. Rhoda and Jack resided in Princeton, New Jersey, and Key West, Florida, during the war. Rhoda volunteered for the Red Cross while living in Key West, beginning her career in philanthropy. She moved to Chicago with her husband following the end of World War II. Jack Pritzker resumed his career as a lawyer at his law firm, Pritzker and Pritzker. She continued to work as a freelance journalist after her arrival in Chicago. However, she also became deeply interested in philanthropy. The couple bought a winter home in Casey Key, Florida, in 1970.

Rhoda and Jack Pritzker had one son, Nicholas J. Pritzker. She was widowed in 1979.

== Other interests ==
She was known to be a passionate contemporary British art collector. She was a leading supporter of works by such artists as Barbara Hepworth, Henry Moore and L.S. Lowry.

== Philanthropy ==
Rhoda Pritzker supported a wide array of causes and organizations as a philanthropist throughout her life. Many of the causes which she championed involved animals, education and the arts.

=== Education and art ===
Pritzker served on the board of directors of the Goodman School of Drama (now called the Theater School at DePaul University) for many years. She was a founding board member of the New College of Florida and continued to serve on the school's board for more than 20 years. Pritzker was a major donor to the New College of Florida's $2.5 million Marine Biology Research Center, which opened in the late 1990s. In the mid-2000s, an endowment fund and college dormitory were named for Rhoda Pritzker after the Pritzker family's philanthropic foundation gave the college $2 million in her Rhoda's name.

Additionally, Pritzker served on the board of trustees of the John and Mable Ringling Museum of Art in Sarasota, Florida, during the 1980s.

=== Animal and environmental causes ===
Pritzker helped to establish the Chicago area Animal Protective Association, an animal shelter and adoption service. She also actively supported a number of animal shelters and rescue centers in Florida. She was reported to be close friends with Cleveland Amory, a well-known animal rights activist. Pritzker was personally known to take in and adopt stray animals. She never collected or wore fur coats.

== Death ==
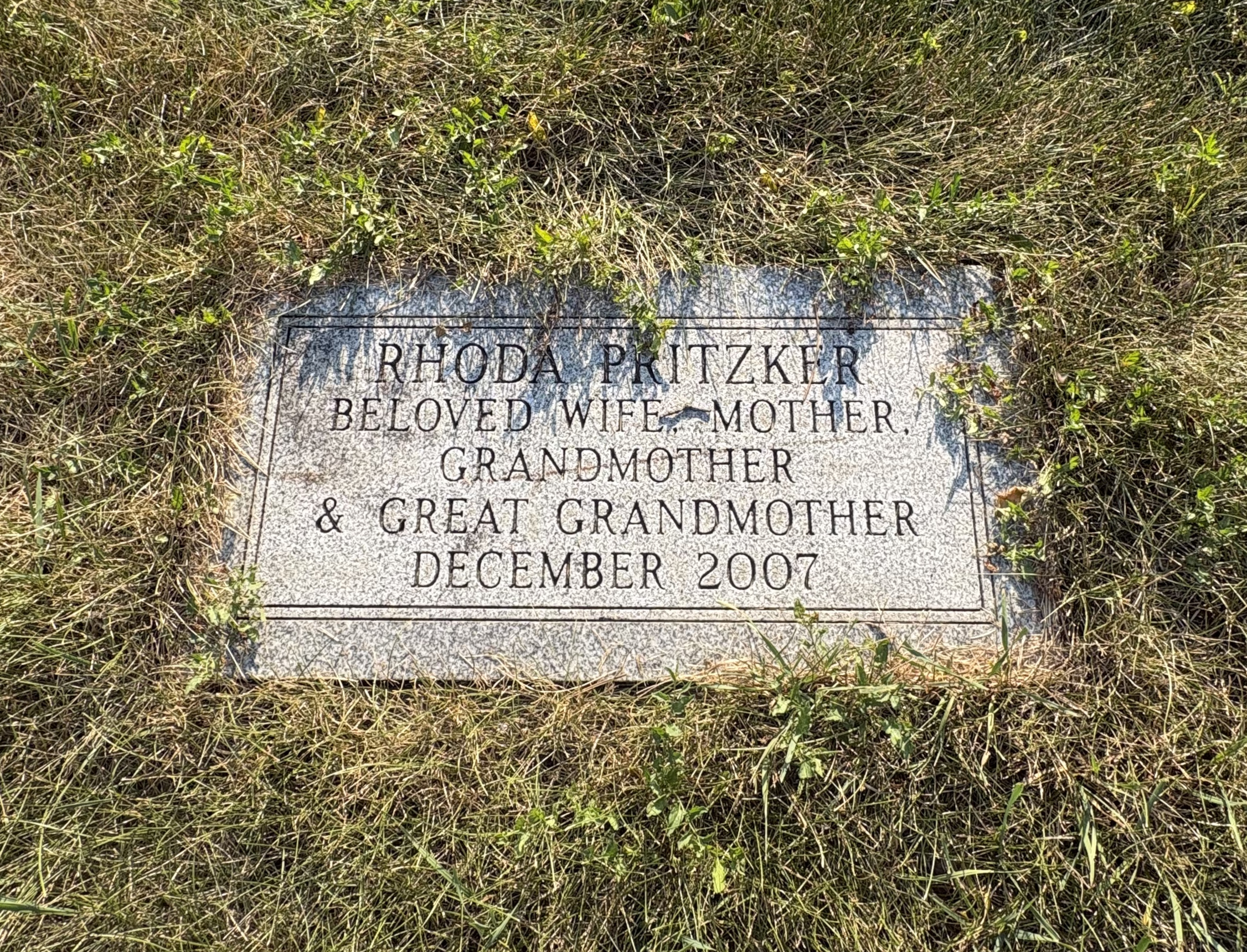
Pritzker's grave at Memorial Park Cemetery

Rhoda Pritzker died at her winter home in Casey Key, Florida, on December 23, 2007, at the age of 93. She had reportedly been in declining health for several months. Her funeral was held in Chicago, and she was buried at Memorial Park Cemetery in Skokie.
