= PEG Africa =

PEG Africa Ltd.
- Type: Private
- Industry: Asset financing Solar power
- Founded: 2013
- Founders: Hugh Whalan; Nate Heller
- Headquarters: Accra, Ghana; Abidjan, Ivory Coast; Dakar, Senegal; Bamako, Mali
- Area served: West Africa
- Website: www.pegafrica.com

PEG Africa (also known as PEG) was a for profit corporation, financing and deploying solar power to households and SMEs in West Africa. The company provides loans for pay-as-you-go (PAYG) solar power home systems and solar water irrigation to customers that do not have access to an electrical grid. The loans are repaid by customers in small increments, using mobile payments. The solar power home systems can be used by customers as collateral for loans on further products and services.

In late summer of 2022, PEG was acquired by Bboxx, a next generation utility company for an undisclosed amount.

== History ==
The company was founded in 2013 by Hugh Whalan (CEO) and Nate Heller (COO). Whalan and Heller had previously run a solar financing and distribution company called Impact Energies in Ghana, which was acquired in 2013 in the first off-grid solar exit in Africa. Whalan also started the first crowdfunding site for energy lending in 2009.

After commercial launch in 2015, the company had over 10,000 customers and 29 service centers across Ghana by 2016, and closed its Series A funding round with a total of $7.5 million. In 2017, the company raised a further $13.5 million through a combination of debt and Series B equity financing. Investors across both rounds of funding included Energy Access Ventures (EAV), Blue Haven Initiative, Investisseurs & Partenaires (I&P), ENGIE Rassembleurs d’Energies, Impact Assets, Acumen, and PCG Investments, among others. In late 2016, the company extended its operations to the Ivory Coast, in 2018 to Senegal and in 2019 to Mali. In March 2019, the company announced a $25 million Series C round taking the total funding raised by PEG to $50 million USD.

Since 2016, PEG Africa has been awarded the B Corporation ‘best for Customers’ and ‘best for the World’ awards. In 2017, the company introduced free hospital insurance for its customers and in 2018 started a corporate social responsibility (CSR) initiative in Ghana named PEG Boafo. The initiative aims to provide education and healthcare support to remote communities in West Africa. In March 2018 PEG provided lighting systems for a school and a medical facility in the Volta Region. Under the Boafo initiative, the company has also established a Learning Center and improved the Community Health Facility in Amotare, a rural community near Begoro.

PEG received the International Ashden Award for Innovative Finance in 2017, an SME Ghana Award in 2018 and the Ghana Energy Award for Off Grid Energy Solution 2018. The company features on the London Stock Exchange Group list of Companies to Inspire Africa 2017 in the Renewable Energy category, and in 2018 was the subject of a Harvard Business School case study. In 2019, PEG became the first company to qualify for the 2x challenge for gender equality.
