= A Little Princess (1995 film) =

Film by Alfonso Cuarón

- Theatrical re-release poster
- Directed by: Alfonso Cuarón
- Screenplay by: Richard LaGravenese; Elizabeth Chandler
- Based on: A Little Princess; 1905 novel by Frances Hodgson Burnett
- Produced by: Mark Johnson
- Starring: Eleanor Bron; Liam Cunningham; Liesel Matthews
- Cinematography: Emmanuel Lubezki
- Edited by: Steven Weisberg
- Music by: Patrick Doyle
- Production company: Baltimore Pictures
- Distributed by: Warner Bros.
- Release date: May 10, 1995
- Running time: 97 minutes
- Country: United States
- Language: English
- Budget: $17 million
- Box office: $10 million

A Little Princess is a 1995 American fantasy drama film directed by Alfonso Cuarón. Based upon the 1905 novel A Little Princess by Frances Hodgson Burnett, the film stars Eleanor Bron, Liam Cunningham (in a dual role), and introducing Liesel Matthews in her film debut with supporting roles done by Vanessa Lee Chester, Rusty Schwimmer, Arthur Malet and Errol Sitahal. Its plot, heavily influenced by the 1939 cinematic version, focuses on Sara Crewe, a young girl who is relegated to a life of servitude at a New York boarding school after receiving news that her father Richard was apparently killed in combat.

A Little Princess was released in the United States by Warner Bros., through their Family Entertainment label, on May 10, 1995. The film received critical acclaim and grossed $10 million.

== Plot ==
In 1914, a kind-hearted young girl named Sara Crewe lives in India with her widowed father Richard, a wealthy British Army Officer who shares her love for stories of myths and magic. Called in to serve in the Great War, Richard enrolls her at the all-girls boarding school in New York City which her late mother had attended. It is run by haughty and spiteful headmistress Miss Maria Minchin and her kindly sister Amelia.

Instructing Miss Minchin to spare no expense for Sara's comfort, Richard furnishes the school's largest suite and leaves Sara with a locket once owned by her mother and a doll named Emily. These he tells her will keep them connected through magic. Although stifled by Miss Minchin’s strictness, Sara becomes popular among the girls, including African-American scullery maid Becky, for her kindness and powerful imagination. In her spare time, she writes to Richard. He gets caught in a gas attack while trying to save fellow soldier John Randolph in the trenches.

Hoping to extort more money from Richard, Miss Minchin throws Sara a lavish birthday party but Richard's solicitor Mr. Barrow arrives with news that he has been killed in battle; the British government has seized his assets, leaving Sara penniless. Miss Minchin moves Sara to the school's attic with Becky to work as a servant and confiscates her belongings, including the locket, allowing her to keep only Emily and a book.

Though her life is bleak, Sara remains kind to others but gets her revenge on Lavinia Herbert, the school bully. Charles Randolph, the elderly neighbor who lives near the school, receives word that his son John has been declared missing in action while fighting in Europe. Ramdas, Charles' Indian associate, comes to notice Sara from the neighboring attic, overhearing her imaginative stories. When a wounded soldier suffering from amnesia is misidentified as John, Ramdas encourages Charles to take the man in.

Meanwhile, Sara's friends sneak into Miss Minchin’s office and recover her locket, visiting Sara that night to hear her tales of Prince Rama. After catching Sara with the other girls, Miss Minchin punishes her and has Becky locked up in the attic for an entire day. However, Sara stands up to Miss Minchin’s cruelty with Richard's belief that "all girls are princesses" regardless of their lot in life. She later comforts Becky by imagining a feast and fine clothes for them. The next day, they awaken to find that the dream has come true, with their attic secretly transformed by Ramdas.

With Sara's encouragement, Amelia runs away with Frances the milkman, with whom she is in love. Later, Miss Minchin discovers that the locket is missing. Confronting Sara in the attic, she accuses her of "stealing" the finery left by Ramdas and viciously locks Sara in her room while she summons the police. With Becky's help, Sara narrowly escapes by making a perilous climb over to the Randolph house. As Miss Minchin and the police search for her, Sara discovers that her father Richard is the recovering soldier but suffering from amnesia, he does not recognize her. Although Miss Minchin clearly recognizes Richard, she instead lies by callously saying that Sara has "no father". As Sara is dragged away by the police to be deported to the United Kingdom, Ramdas helps Richard regain his memory. Outside, Richard saves her and the two are happily reunited while Miss Minchin, defeated, angrily walks away.

Sometime later, Charles has taken over the school, now a much happier place for the girls, and has found peace in knowing that Richard tried to save John. Richard's fortune has been restored, and he has adopted Becky. As for Miss Minchin, she is reduced to working for Jim, a young chimney sweep she mistreated earlier. Sara gives Emily to the girls and shares an unexpected hug with Lavinia, before she and Becky depart for home.

== Cast ==
- Eleanor Bron as Mrs Maria Minchin, a cynical, cruel woman and a greedy and heartless headmistress. She runs the boarding school.
- Liam Cunningham as:
  - Richard Crewe, a captain in the British Army and Sara's father.
  - Prince Rama, a character from Sara's story.
- Liesel Matthews as Sara Crewe, Richard's beautiful daughter who enrolls at a New York City boarding school.
- Rusty Schwimmer as Mrs Amelia Minchin, Maria's long-suffering younger sister.
- Arthur Malet as Charles Randolph, a kind old man who lives next door to the school. He is loosely based on the book character Thomas Carrisford.
- Vanessa Lee Chester as Becky, a young African-American servant who lives in the attic of the school.
- Errol Sitahal as Ram Dass, a lascar who is Randolph's wise Indian servant who later befriends Sara.
- Heather DeLoach as Ermengarde St. John, a shy, insecure girl often bullied by Lavinia and Miss Minchin.
- Taylor Fry as Lavinia Herbert, a vindictive bully who is bitterly jealous of Sara's wealth and popularity.
- Kelsey Mulrooney as Lottie Leigh, a volatile youngest girl at Sara's school prone to tantrums and fits.
- Rachael Bella as Betsy, Sara's schoolmate.
- Camilla Belle as Jane, Sara's schoolmate.
- Alison Moir as Princess Sita, a character from Sara's story who resembles her mother.
- Time Winters as Frances, a milkman.
- Lomax Study as Monsieur Dufarge, the boarding school French teacher.
- Vincent Schiavelli as Mr. Barrow, Richard's solicitor.
- Ken Palmer as John Randolph, a soldier and Charles' son.
- Peggy Miley as Mabel, a cook who works for Miss Minchin.
- Jonás Cuarón as Jim, the chimney sweeper.

== Soundtrack ==
A Little Princess

Film score by Patrick Doyle
- Released: May 9, 1995
- Length: 49:57
- Label: Varèse Sarabande

Patrick Doyle chronology
Exit to Eden (1994)	A Little Princess (1995)	Sense and Sensibility (1995)

All of the tracks were composed by Patrick Doyle. Three of the tracks feature soloists. The "String Quintet in C major Perger 108, MH 187" by Michael Haydn is also used in the film. The film also features the New London Children's Choir.

1. "Ramayana: A Morning Raga" (2:03)
2. "Children Running" (0:53)
3. "Cristina Elisa Waltz" (3:03)
4. "The Miss Minchin School for Girls" (1:40)
5. "Knowing You by Heart" (2:32)
6. "Breakfast" (0:55)
7. "Letter to Papa" (1:38)
8. "Angel Wings" (1:07)
9. "False Hope" (2:05)
10. "The Trenches" (1:00)
11. "Crewe and the Soldier" (1:22)
12. "Alone" (1:19)
13. "The Attic" (2:00)
14. "On Another's Sorrow" — Catherine Hopper (1:16)
15. "The Shawl" (0:54)
16. "Tyger Tyger" (0:32)
17. "Compassion" (0:37)
18. "For the Princess" (1:38)
19. "Kindle My Heart" — Abigail Doyle (the daughter of the composer) (3:00)
20. "The Locket Hunt" (3:02)
21. "Midnight Tiptoe" (1:13)
22. "I Am a Princess" (1:14)
23. "Just Make Believe" (1:33)
24. "Touched by an Angel" (1:43)
25. "Emilia Elopes" (1:38)
26. "The Escape" (2:58)
27. "Papa!" (2:32)
28. "Kindle My Heart" — Liesel Matthews (4:19)

On May 2, 2025, Varèse Sarabande released an expanded deluxe edition of the soundtrack which featured an 11-minute bonus section of unreleased cues and alternates with 7 tracks, including 3 suites. New liner notes for this release were provided by Daniel Schweiger.

== Reception ==
On the review aggregator website Rotten Tomatoes, 97% of 38 critics' reviews are positive, with an average rating of 8.2/10. The website's consensus reads: "Alfonso Cuarón adapts Frances Hodgson Burnett's novel with a keen sense of magic realism, vividly recreating the world of childhood as seen through the characters." Metacritic, which uses a weighted average, assigned the film a score of 83 out of 100, based on 19 critics, indicating "universal acclaim".

Janet Maslin called the film "a bright, beautiful and enchantingly childlike vision", one that "draw[s] its audience into the wittily heightened reality of a fairy tale" and "takes enough liberties to re-invent rather than embalm Miss Burnett's assiduously beloved story". She concluded:

From the huge head of an Indian deity, used as a place where stories are told and children play, to the agile way a tear drips from Sara's eye to a letter read by her father in the rain, A Little Princess has been conceived, staged and edited with special grace. Less an actors' film than a series of elaborate tableaux, it has a visual eloquence that extends well beyond the limits of its story. To see Sara whirling ecstatically in her attic room on a snowy night, exulting in the feelings summoned by an evocative sight in a nearby window, is to know just how stirringly lovely a children's film can be.

Rita Kempley of The Washington Post called the film Cuarón's "dazzling North American [sic] debut" and wrote it "exquisitely re-creates the ephemeral world of childhood, an enchanted kingdom where everything, even make-believe, seems possible ... Unlike most distaff mythology, the film does not concern the heroine's sexual awakening; it's more like the typical hero's journey described by scholar Joseph Campbell. Sara, the adored and pampered child of a wealthy British widower, must pass a series of tests, thereby discovering her inner strengths".

== Awards ==
Award	Category	Recipient	Result
Academy Awards	Best Art Direction	Bo Welch and Cheryl Carasik	Nominated
Academy Awards	Best Cinematography	Emmanuel Lubezki	Nominated
Los Angeles Film Critics Association Awards	Best Picture		2nd place
Los Angeles Film Critics Association Awards	Best Production Design	Bo Welch	Won
Los Angeles Film Critics Association Awards	Best Music	Patrick Doyle	Won
Young Artist Awards	Best Family Feature - Drama		Nominated
Young Artist Awards	Best Young Leading Actress	Vanessa Lee Chester	Nominated
Young Artist Awards	Best Young Leading Actress	Liesel Matthews	Nominated

== Home video release ==
As of April 1997, Warner Bros. sold two million copies for an estimated $32 million in video revenue—the studio receiving 75%—greatly exceeding box office gross. The film was first released on VHS and LaserDisc on September 19, 1995 and was first released on DVD on November 19, 1997.

== See also ==
- Sarah... Ang Munting Prinsesa - a 1995 Filipino film adaptation of A Little Princess.
