= Air Force One (film) =

1997 film by Wolfgang Petersen

- Theatrical release poster
- Directed by: Wolfgang Petersen
- Written by: Andrew W. Marlowe
- Produced by: Armyan Bernstein; Gail Katz; Jonathan Shestack; Wolfgang Petersen
- Starring: Harrison Ford; Gary Oldman; Wendy Crewson; Paul Guilfoyle; William H. Macy; Liesel Matthews; Dean Stockwell
- Cinematography: Michael Ballhaus
- Edited by: Richard Francis-Bruce
- Music by: Jerry Goldsmith
- Production companies: Columbia Pictures; Beacon Pictures; Radiant Productions
- Distributed by: Sony Pictures Releasing (United States and Canada); Buena Vista International (International)
- Release dates: July 21, 1997 (Century City); July 25, 1997 (United States)
- Running time: 124 minutes
- Country: United States
- Languages: English; Russian
- Budget: $85 million
- Box office: $315.2 million

Air Force One is a 1997 American political action thriller film directed and co-produced by Wolfgang Petersen and written by Andrew W. Marlowe. Starring Harrison Ford, Gary Oldman, Glenn Close, Wendy Crewson, Xander Berkeley, William H. Macy, Dean Stockwell, Paul Guilfoyle and Jürgen Prochnow, the film follows Air Force One being hijacked by a group of terrorists who demand the release of their country's imprisoned dictator and the president's attempt to rescue everyone on board by retaking his plane.

Air Force One premiered in Century City on July 21, 1997 and was released by Sony Pictures Releasing on July 25, 1997 in the United States and Canada, with Buena Vista International releasing in other territories. The film was a box office success and received mostly positive critical reviews. It became the fifth highest-grossing film of 1997, earning $315.2 million worldwide against an $85 million budget. It also received two Academy Award nominations for Best Sound and Best Film Editing, losing both awards to Titanic.

== Plot ==
A joint operation between American and Russian special forces captures General Ivan Radek, the dictator of a rogue neo-Soviet regime in Kazakhstan that retained its nuclear weapons, threatening war. Three weeks later, U.S. president James Marshall attends a diplomatic dinner in Moscow, during which he praises the operation and warns the United States will not negotiate with terrorists. Marshall and his entourage, including his wife Grace and daughter Alice, and several of his cabinet and advisers, prepare to return home on Air Force One. Six Radek loyalists disguised as journalists, led by Egor Korshunov, board the plane.

After takeoff, Secret Service agent Gibbs, a mole, enables Korshunov and his men to obtain weapons and hijack the plane, killing multiple security and military personnel before taking the passengers hostage, including Grace and Alice. Marshall is raced to an escape pod in the cargo hold and seemingly escapes as the pod is ejected. Korshunov breaches the cockpit, aborting the plane from making an emergency landing at Ramstein Air Base. A squadron of F-15s escort Air Force One as Korshunov has it piloted towards Kazakhstan.

However, Marshall, a veteran of the Vietnam War and a Medal of Honor recipient, had hidden himself in the cargo hold instead of using the pod. He covertly kills two of Korshunov's men and obtains a satellite phone to communicate with vice president Kathryn Bennett, letting his staff know he is still alive and aboard the plane. Korshunov, assuming that it is merely a Secret Service agent in the cargo hold, contacts Bennett and demands Radek's release, threatening to kill a hostage every half-hour. Separating Alice and Grace from the group, he kills National Security Advisor Jack Doherty and Deputy Press Secretary Melanie Mitchell. Marshall unsuccessfully tries to force Korshunov to land by dumping some fuel after rewiring the plane's circuitry.

Marshall devises a plan to trick Korshunov into bringing Air Force One to a lower altitude of 15,000 feet for a mid-air refueling so that the hostages can parachute safely off the plane. As a KC-10 tanker docks with Air Force One, Marshall escorts the hostages to the cargo hold, where the majority parachute to safety. Korshunov and his men discover the deception and catch Marshall, Chief of Staff Lloyd Shepherd, Major Norman Caldwell, and Gibbs. The induced turbulence severs the connection between the tanker and Air Force One, and the fuel leak ignites, destroying the tanker.

With the president and his family now under his control, Korshunov forces Marshall to contact Russian president Stolicha Petrov and arrange for Radek's release. Bennett is urged by Defense Secretary Walter Dean to invoke the 25th Amendment, thus overriding Radek's release, but she refuses. While Korshunov and his men celebrate Radek's release, Marshall breaks free and kills Korshunov and his remaining loyalists. Marshall rescinds his order, and Radek is shot and killed while attempting to escape.

Marshall and Caldwell direct the plane back to friendly airspace but are tailed by a second batch of Radek loyalists in MiG-29s. The F-15s rejoin Air Force One and engage and defeat the enemy aircraft, but Air Force One suffers severe damage to its fuel tanks, engines, and tail controls from the MiGs' gunfire, and an explosion from an F-15 when its pilot sacrifices himself to intercept a missile.

A standby United States Air Force Special Operations Command MC-130E with the callsign Liberty 24 is called to help, sending parajumpers on tether lines to rescue the survivors. Marshall insists that his family and the wounded Shepherd be transferred first. When there is time for only one more transfer, Gibbs reveals himself as the traitor, killing Caldwell and the parajumper. Marshall attacks Gibbs and attaches himself to the transfer line at the last moment. Air Force One crashes into the Caspian Sea, killing Gibbs, while the MC-130E airmen reel Marshall to safety. With Marshall and his family safe, Liberty 24 is given the callsign Air Force One as it flies to safety.

== Cast ==
First Family

- Harrison Ford as President James Marshall
- Wendy Crewson as First Lady Grace Marshall
- Liesel Matthews as Alice Marshall, the President's daughter

Terrorists

- Gary Oldman as Egor Korshunov, terrorist ringleader and Radek loyalist
- Elya Baskin as Andrei Kolchak, Korshunov's best friend, lieutenant and pilot
- Levan Uchaneishvili as Sergei Lenski, communications expert
- David Vadim as Igor Nevsky
- Andrew Divoff as Boris Bazylev
- Ilia Volok as Vladimir Krasin, Korshunov's close friend, whom he served with in the Soviet–Afghan War
- Xander Berkeley as Secret Service Special Agent David Gibbs, head of the Presidential Protective Division, later revealed as the hijackers' inside man

U.S. Government on Air Force One

- Paul Guilfoyle as White House Chief of Staff Lloyd "Shep" Shepherd
- William H. Macy as Major Norman Caldwell, United States Air Force, military aide to the President
- Tom Everett as National Security Advisor Jack Doherty
- Donna Bullock as Deputy Press Secretary Melanie Mitchell
- Michael Ray Miller as Colonel Axelrod, United States Air Force, pilot of Air Force One
- Carl Weintraub as Lieutenant Colonel Ingraham, United States Air Force, co-pilot of Air Force One
- Glenn Morshower as United States Secret Service Agent Walters
- David Gianopoulos as United States Secret Service Agent Johnson

U.S. Government in Washington

- Glenn Close as Vice President Kathryn Bennett
- Dean Stockwell as Defense Secretary Walter Dean
- Spencer Garrett as White House aide Thomas Lee
- Bill Smitrovich as General William Northwood, the Chairman of the Joint Chiefs of Staff
- J. A. Preston as Major General Samuel Greely, President Marshall's commanding officer during the Vietnam War
- Philip Baker Hall as Attorney General Andrew Ward
- Richard Doyle as Colonel Bob Jackson, United States Air Force, Air Force One Backup Pilot
- Willard Pugh as White House communications officer
- Diana Bellamy as White House switchboard operator Pananides
- Michael Monks as Assistant White House Press Secretary

Cameos

- Alan Woolf as Russian president Stolicha Petrov
- Jürgen Prochnow as General Ivan Radek, the military dictator of a rogue terrorist regime in Kazakhstan
- Don McManus as Lieutenant Colonel Jack Carlton, F-15 "Halo Flight" leader
- Dan Shor as Lewis, Notre Dame aide

== Production ==
=== Development ===
A large part of the crew took a tour of the real Air Force One before filming. Some scenes, most notably where the terrorists tour the plane, were based on this touring experience. The character of Deputy Press Secretary Melanie Mitchell was based largely on their real-life tour guide, and the crew felt uncomfortable having to film the character's execution by the terrorists. For the exterior scenes, the producers rented a Boeing 747-146 aircraft, N703CK from Kalitta Air and repainted it to replicate the Air Force One livery.

Air Force One is shown as being equipped with a one-person escape pod for emergency use by the president of the United States. It was also done this way in at least three other films, Escape from New York, Bermuda Tentacles and Big Game. The actual Air Force One does not have an escape pod.

Paul Attanasio was brought in as a script doctor to work on the film prior to shooting. In the original draft, Gibbs revealed himself as the mole early and joined the terrorists in hijacking the plane. Scenes explaining his motivation were cut from the final script, with director Wolfgang Petersen reasoning that the scene was considered too long to tell and irrelevant to the plot. The director felt it was more suspenseful to keep the audience in the know in the final cut and specifically pointed to the scene in which Marshall gives Gibbs a gun before escorting the hostages from the conference room to the parachutes in the cargo hold.

Gary Oldman was hired to play the role as the film's villain after choosing not to accept a role in Speed 2: Cruise Control. Petersen later said he called the filming experience "Air Force Fun" because of how comic and genial Oldman would be off-screen. He also said that Oldman would suddenly return to the menacing film persona "like a shot." Oldman used his acting fee for the film to help finance his directorial debut, Nil by Mouth.

Kevin Costner was offered the role of James Marshall, but turned it down as he had other commitments. He went on to play the lead role in The Postman instead. The script was then given to Harrison Ford who accepted it.

=== Filming ===
General Radek's palace, seen in the film's opening, was portrayed by two locations in Cleveland, Ohio: the exterior was Severance Hall, and the interior was the Cuyahoga County Courthouse. The Russian prison where Radek was incarcerated was the Ohio State Reformatory, previously seen in The Shawshank Redemption and also used for Godsmack's music video for "Awake" in 2000. Ramstein Air Base, Germany was portrayed by Rickenbacker Air National Guard Base, Ohio. The diplomatic dinner scene was shot at the Ebell of Los Angeles while a second unit captured scenes in Red Square in Moscow. Scenes featuring Sheremetyevo International Airport, the departure airport of Air Force One in the film, were shot at Los Angeles International Airport. At the Van Nuys Airport, production would take place in some of the hangars on one side of the runway while Dante's Peak's film crew occupied the buildings on the other side.

Ford refused to do a scene in the script where Marshall sits down to gather himself as he felt that he didn't sit down when family is in a crisis. Marlowe always felt the "Get off my plane!" line was cheesy until Ford performed it to "pitch-perfect".

F-15C Eagle aircraft from the 33rd Operations Group, 33rd Fighter Wing at Eglin AFB, Florida were used in the film.

=== Score ===
Air Force One: Original Motion Picture Soundtrack

Soundtrack album by Jerry Goldsmith
- Released: July 29, 1997
- Genre: Film score
- Length: 34:37
- Label: Varèse Sarabande

Jerry Goldsmith chronology
Fierce Creatures (1997)	Air Force One: Original Motion Picture Soundtrack (1997)	L.A. Confidential (1997)

Randy Newman was initially hired to write the film score. However, Petersen considered his composition to be almost a parody and commissioned Jerry Goldsmith to write and record a more somber and patriotic score in just twelve days, with assistance from Joel McNeely. After the experience, Goldsmith vowed to never again take on such a last-minute task.

The music label Varèse Sarabande released a soundtrack album featuring Goldsmith's music. McNeely receives a credit on the back cover for "Additional Music in the Motion Picture", but none of his work is on the CD, although his cues include the material heard when Air Force One is under attack. On September 27, 2019, a 2-CD release featuring the full score was released.

The first track of the soundtrack, "The Parachutes", was used by Donald Trump during his campaign for president of the United States in 2016. The track was played in the background at the New York Hilton Midtown prior to Trump's victory speech, following Hillary Clinton's concession. The track was used repeatedly at campaign events with the Trump plane as background, leading the film's producer to ask him to stop using it.

== Reception ==
=== Critical response ===
On Rotten Tomatoes, Air Force One has an approval rating of 78% based on 65 reviews, with an average rating of 7/10. The site's critical consensus reads, "This late-period Harrison Ford actioner is full of palpable, if not entirely seamless, thrills." On Metacritic, the film has a weighted average score of 62 out of 100, based on 25 critics, indicating "generally favorable" reviews. Audiences polled by CinemaScore gave the film an average grade of "A" on an A+ to F scale.

Peter Travers of Rolling Stone awarded the film 3.5/4 stars, describing it as "superior escapism", and concluding, "Air Force One doesn't insult the audience. It is crafted by a film-maker who takes pride in the thrills and sly fun he packs into every frame. Welcome to something rare in a summer of crass commercialism: a class act." Todd McCarthy of Variety described the film as "a preposterously pulpy but quite entertaining suspense meller [melodrama]" that is "spiked by some spectacularly staged and genuinely tense action sequences". He lauded the film's antagonist: "[Gary] Oldman, in his second malevolent lead of the summer, after The Fifth Element, registers strongly as a veteran of the Afghan campaign pushed to desperate lengths to newly ennoble his country."

In a mixed review, Roger Ebert of the Chicago Sun-Times gave the film 2.5 stars out of 4 and found it flawed and cliché-ridden yet "well-served by the quality of the performances ... Air Force One is a fairly competent recycling of familiar ingredients, given an additional interest because of Harrison Ford's personal appeal." Adam Mars-Jones of The Independent was more critical, calling it "so preposterous that it begins to seem like a science-fiction artifact ... the product of a parallel-universe 1990s which somehow by-passed the decades since the 1950s." Barbara Shulgasser of the San Francisco Examiner wrote, "Just think of this as Die Hard in a suit, with an election coming up."

President Bill Clinton saw the film twice while in office and gave it good reviews. He noted that certain elements of the film's version of Air Force One, such as the escape pod and the rear parachute ramp, did not reflect features of the actual Air Force One (though since many Air Force One features are highly classified and "need-to-know", these features cannot be completely ruled out). In the audio commentary, Wolfgang Petersen mused that although the real plane did not have those features at the time of the filming, they would probably be added by future governments.

During his campaign for the Presidency of the United States in the 2016 presidential election, businessman and Republican presidential candidate Donald Trump said he admired Ford for his role in Air Force One because he "stood up for America". Ford responded by reasoning that "it was just a film" and doubted Trump's presidential bid would be successful. In turn, Trump played the theme of Air Force One prior to his introduction speech as President-elect.

A Wall Street Journal poll in 2016 named Harrison Ford's James Marshall as the greatest fictional president.

=== Box office ===
As one of the most popular action films of the 1990s, Air Force One earned $37.1 million during its opening weekend and ranked number one at the box office, displacing Men in Black. At the time, the film had the fourth-highest opening weekend of that year, behind the latter film, The Lost World: Jurassic Park and Batman & Robin. It scored the highest opening weekend for an R-rated film, surpassing Interview with the Vampire. The film maintained that record for three years until it was surpassed by Scary Movie in 2000. Additionally, the film achieved the highest opening weekend for a Harrison Ford film, surpassing the former record held by Indiana Jones and the Last Crusade. For a decade, it held this record until 2008, when it was taken by Indiana Jones and the Kingdom of the Crystal Skull. Air Force One went on to make $172,650,002 (54.9%) domestically and $142,200,000 (45.1%) in other countries, bringing the total gross to $315.2 million.

The movie's financial success would end up having an impact in the sports world, specifically in the National Hockey League (NHL). The Colorado Avalanche, then owned by COMSAT entertainment division Ascent Entertainment, were cash-strapped and had lost $8 million the previous year. Prior to the movie being released, team captain Joe Sakic was a restricted free agent and had signed a three-year, $21 million offer sheet, that included a massive $15 million up-front signing bonus, with the New York Rangers. Under the NHL Collective Bargaining Agreement at the time, the Avalanche had one week to match the Rangers' offer or let go Sakic in exchange for five first-round draft picks as compensation. It seemed as if the Avalanche could not afford to keep Sakic, as they had already committed large amounts of salary to Peter Forsberg and Patrick Roy. However, the money made by Air Force One allowed the Avalanche to match the offer and keep Sakic. Doing so would result in a salary raise for many NHL players. Sakic would go onto play 11 more seasons, all with the Avalanche, before retiring in 2009. In that period the future Hockey Hall of Famer would win the Hart Memorial Trophy, Lady Byng Memorial Trophy, Lester B. Pearson Award, and be named to three NHL first All-Star teams. As team captain during that period, he would lead the Avalanche to nine playoff appearances, a Presidents' Trophy, and the 2001 Stanley Cup. Sakic would join the Avalanche's front office after retiring and would eventually work his way up to becoming the team's general manager, a role with would see him help put together a team who would win the Presidents' Trophy in 2020–21 and the 2022 Stanley Cup. He would also win the Jim Gregory General Manager of the Year Award in the same season as the Cup win.

=== Accolades ===
Award	Category	Subject	Result
Academy Awards	Best Sound	Doug Hemphill	Nominated
Academy Awards	Best Sound	Rick Kline	Nominated
Academy Awards	Best Sound	Paul Massey	Nominated
Academy Awards	Best Sound	Keith A. Wester	Nominated
Academy Awards	Best Film Editing	Richard Francis-Bruce	Nominated
ACE Eddie	Best Edited Feature Film	Richard Francis-Bruce	Nominated
ASCAP Award	Top Box Office Films	Joel McNeely	Won
Bambi Award	Direction	Wolfgang Petersen	Won
Bambi Award	Actor	Harrison Ford	Won
Blockbuster Entertainment Awards	Favorite Actor – Action/Adventure	Harrison Ford	Nominated
Blockbuster Entertainment Awards	Favorite Supporting Actor – Action/Adventure	Gary Oldman	Nominated
Blockbuster Entertainment Awards	Favorite Supporting Actress – Action/Adventure	Glenn Close	Won
Bogey Award			Won
Broadcast Music, Inc.	BMI Film Music Award	Jerry Goldsmith (also for L.A. Confidential)	Won
Japan Academy Prize	Outstanding Foreign Language Film	Joel McNeely	Nominated
MTV Movie Awards	Best Fight	Harrison Ford	Nominated
MTV Movie Awards	Best Fight	Gary Oldman	Nominated
MTV Movie Awards	Best Villain	Gary Oldman	Nominated
Satellite Award	Best Editing	Richard Francis-Bruce	Nominated

The film is recognized by American Film Institute in these lists:

- 2001: AFI's 100 Years...100 Thrills – Nominated

== Home media ==
Air Force One was released on VHS, LaserDisc, and DVD on February 10, 1998, and on Blu-ray on June 2, 2009. A 4K UHD Blu-ray followed on November 6, 2018.

A Superbit DVD featuring a DTS audio track premiered on October 9, 2001, joining The Fifth Element, Crouching Tiger, Hidden Dragon, Desperado and Johnny Mnemonic as one of the first five films to be released under the Superbit label.

The US LaserDisc release of the film is notorious among LaserDisc collectors as being extremely prone to "Laser rot", a form of optical disc degradation, due to repeat production issues at the Sony DADC facility where the discs were produced.

== Novelization ==
A novelization of the film was published in June 1997 by author Max Allan Collins. Although the book has the same central plot and outcomes as the film, its main storyline has additional scenes and lines not in the film. The book develops characters more than the film. Marshall is described as possessing a smile that is described in the novel as "the most valuable weapon in his public relations arsenal" (p. 11). He promotes an interventionist line on foreign policy and a strong stance against terrorism (met with political opposition from opposition Speaker of the House Franklin Danforth in the novel). He is described as a first-term President, up for re-election later on in the year that the film is set in. Marshall's home state is Iowa. A two-term former governor of Iowa in the novel, he first campaigns in the film for the US House.

He graduated from University of Iowa in the early 1970s in the novel and may also have attended the University of Notre Dame. His senior Staff and Cabinet include Vice President Kathryn Bennett (former congresswoman and trial attorney from New Jersey), Chief of Staff Lloyd Shepherd (an old friend from U of I), National Security Advisor Jack Doherty, Secretary of Defense Walter Dean, Deputy NSA Director Thomas Lee, Deputy Press Secretary Melanie Mitchell, Chairman of the Joint Chiefs Northwood, and Air Force General Greeley (under whom Marshall served in Vietnam). His Party is Republican in the novel.

Marshall is described in the novel as "a moderate-Republican version of Bill Clinton, minus the womanizing reputation, and without a hint of personal or professional scandal" (p. 99–100). Korshunov's family is expanded upon, and it is revealed that Korshunov is not his real name. Unlike the movie, Gibbs's identity as the traitor is not revealed until the end of the book. It also hints at his motivation: "What he did remember, as he sipped his coffee, was that he knew these men, had worked with these men, and it was a damn shame they had to die so that he could be wealthy." Korshunov later tells Marshall he "paid" him off. It also presents a slightly alternative ending: in the novel, Air Force One crashes in the Russian countryside, whereas in the film, it crashes into the Caspian Sea.
