= Civic application =

Software to encourage participation in government

A civic application is an application software designed to encourage users to participate in and learn more about government.

Civic applications are often social networking services, but what distinguishes them is the civic goal–the mission funding their existence. Additionally, the mutual interaction between the user and the application is what differentiates civic applications from any IT service (i.e. a website or portal). With the latter, interaction between the user and the application is not necessary and often takes the form of commenting under articles.

In civil societies, civic applications are created to enhance public works, civic engagement, and general social capital. Civic applications can aim at:

- development of engaged citizenship
- strengthening of local communities
- growth of democracy
- supporting entrepreneurship
- protection of nature and common living space

Civic applications can be accessed online from a server using a web browser, using mobile devices such as mobile phones or tablets, and offline from the user's local drive.

== Origins ==
On January 20, 2009, U.S. President Barack Obama signed the "Memorandum on Transparency and Open Government", requesting that government agencies make their data–such as real-time crime feeds and air-quality metrics–open and available to the public. This memorandum marked a pivotal legislative moment, as the government improved the distribution of public services through new technologies characterized by civic open data. The "Memorandum on Transparency and Open Government" also provided companies seeking to join the civic technology world with a framework to build their civic applications.

However, the history of civic applications can be traced back years earlier, with the creation of various civic technology platforms such as Ushahidi, which supports election monitoring and crisis reporting, as well as TheyWorkForYou, which simplifies complex political information into layman's terms for voters. Environment-focused civic applications also exist, such as Accela's Civic Application for Environmental Health.

Today, many civic applications have been established, with civic technology leaders such as Jennifer Palka (Code for America) and Colin Megill (Pol.is) paving the way for future innovation.

== Current Applications ==
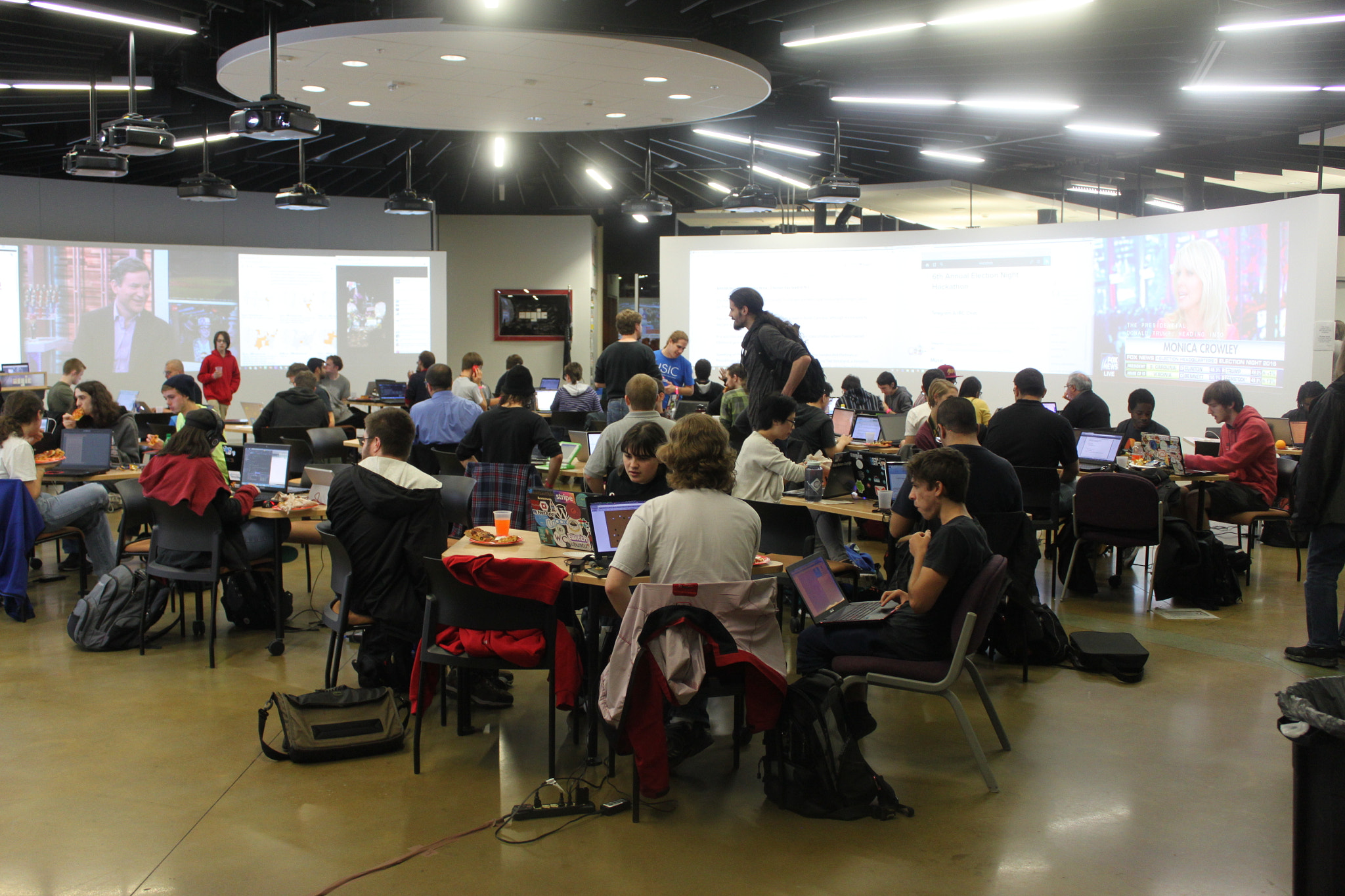
Nov. 8, 2016 – Students at Rochester Institute of Technology participate in a hackathon designed to create civic applications

One potential benefit of civic applications is that they can help disseminate democracy. On social media applications, users have widespread access to political information, including the voting decisions of their elected representatives and information on legislative ballots. Civic applications can help streamline and clarify political information to improve voter competency. Additionally, politicians can use civic applications to bridge the communicative divide between government and their constituents.

However, civic applications also have shortcomings. For example, many civic applications struggle with financial sustainability. Such applications often have either non-profit or not-for-profit corporate strategies, which prevent them from adopting stable strategies of fundraising and a majority end up failing from lack of income stream or funding.

Non-Governmental Organizations and public national institutions are noticing the value of civic applications and are inviting people working in the Information Technology domain to participate in their development (ex. in Greater Portland, Chicago, Boston, Boulder, Washington D.C, Seattle and other American cities as part of the Code For America initiative). Very often they are created as part of "hackathons", or IT development competitions which support entrepreneurial ventures. In 2008, Vivek Kundra hosted the first open government data hackathon. The event, called "Apps for Democracy" invited outside civic hackers to make use of the city's open data portal, leading to the creation of 47 apps.

Civic applications are part of a greater concept of civic technologies, which encompass a variety of civic applications, software tools and platforms, and technology supporting local and national governments in performing public functions.
