= Abram Nicholas Pritzker =

American businessman

- Pritzker in 1983
- Born: January 6, 1896
- Died: February 8, 1986 (aged 90)
- Education: DePaul University; Harvard University
- Occupations: Attorney; Real estate investor
- Spouse: Fanny Doppelt
- Children: Jay Pritzker; Robert Pritzker; Donald Pritzker
- Family: Jack Nicholas Pritzker (brother); Harry Nicholas Pritzker (brother)

Abram Nicholas Pritzker (January 6, 1896 – February 8, 1986) was an American businessman and attorney, and the patriarch of the Pritzker family.

== Early life and education ==
Abram was the son of Ukrainian Jewish immigrants, Annie P. (née Cohn) and Nicholas J. Pritzker. His father left Kyiv for Chicago in 1881 and worked first as a pharmacist and then, after graduating from DePaul University College of Law, as a lawyer. His father wrote a small book that has been passed down the generations; the theme of the book is "Your only immortality is the impact you have on your successors." Abram graduated from Harvard Law School.

== Career ==
Abram joined his father's law firm, Pritzker & Pritzker, along with his brothers, Harry and Jack. Harry specialized in criminal law, Abram (called Abe and later A.N.) specialized in business law, and Jack in real estate law. In the 1930s, he left the law practice and branched out with his brother Jack, investing in real estate and small companies, mostly in the Chicago area. Harry continued to run the law firm, which eventually became an in-house firm catering solely to the needs of the Pritzker family and its business. The Pritzker brothers were very successful and amassed a considerable fortune. They shielded their earnings from taxes through a series of trusts, which enabled them to distribute the money as they chose.

== Philanthropy ==
Pritzker's philanthropic endeavors include funding the Pritzker School of Medicine at the University of Chicago. He also set up a trust fund for the A.N. Pritzker Elementary School, which he had attended when it was called the Wicker Park Elementary School.

== Personal life ==
Pritzker had three sons: Jay Pritzker, Robert Pritzker, and Donald Pritzker. His sons continued to grow the family business, eventually buying the Hyatt House hotel in Los Angeles in 1957 and forming the cornerstone of their hotel chain.

His son Robert created a conglomerate of a multitude of manufacturing companies that grew into the multibillion-dollar Marmon Group. Marmon was diversified to include manufacturing concerns ranging from lumber to railroad boxcars and travel industry staples. It composed half of the family's wealth. On December 25, 2007, it was announced that Warren Buffett, through Berkshire Hathaway, would purchase 60% of the Marmon Group from the Pritzkers for $4.5 billion.

The Pritzkers also own a large stake in Royal Caribbean, a cruise line operator. TransUnion, a consumer credit reporting agency, was a subsidiary of The Marmon Group until January 2005, when it became an independent, privately held company.

One of his granddaughters is actress Liesel Pritzker. Another is former United States Secretary of Commerce Penny Pritzker. One of his grandsons is Daniel Pritzker, the founder of the Chicago band Sonia Dada. Another grandson, J. B. Pritzker was elected Democratic Governor of Illinois in November 2018 replacing Republican Bruce Rauner.
