= A.N. Pritzker School =

A.N. Pritzker Elementary School
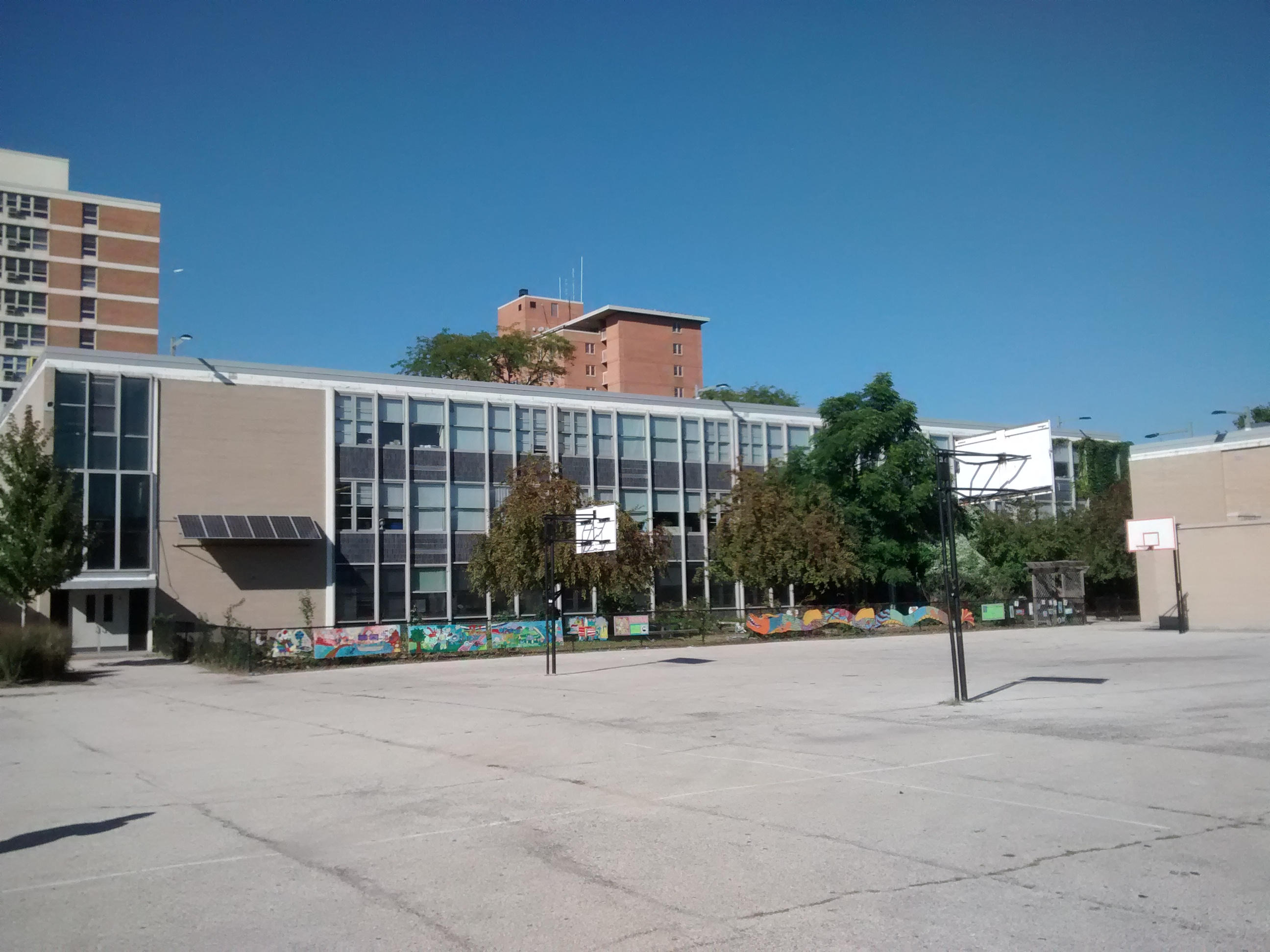

Location
- 2009 West Schiller Street; Chicago, Illinois 60622; United States
- Coordinates: 41°54′25.04″N 87°40′40.37″W

Information
- Type: magnet elementary school, neighborhood school, gifted school
- Motto: The Magic Lies Within
- Oversight: Chicago Public Schools
- Principal: Dr. Joenile S. Albert-Reese
- Grades: K-8
- Gender: Co-ed
- Enrollment: 625
- Campus type: Urban
- Colors: Maroon and Gold
- Nickname: The Wildcats
- Website: www.pritzkerschool.org

A.N. Pritzker School is a public pre-K to grade 8 school in the Wicker Park neighborhood of Chicago, Illinois. The school serves grades K-8 with its neighborhood magnet-cluster school focused on fine and performing arts and a Regional Gifted Center. Pritzker also offers a pre-K for. The school is part of the Chicago Public Schools (CPS) system. The students and its mascot are referred to as the Wildcats.

Pritzker earned the 2010 Spotlight Schools Award for Academic Achievement, for Exemplary Performance in Closing the Achievement Gap, Meeting High Standards, and Opening a World of Opportunities. Additionally, Pritzker won the Spotlight Schools Award in 2009.

Also in 2010, Pritzker was acknowledged by CPS as a Level 1 (Excellent Rating) in Overall School Performance.

== Notable alumni ==
- A. N. Pritzker

== Pritzker's Regional Gifted Center ==
Pritzker is one of the Regional Gifted Centers within the City of Chicago's Public School district. The Regional Gifted Centers provide accelerated pace instruction generally up to two years above grade level. The RGC curriculum focus is on critical thinking, logical reasoning and general problem solving skills. RGC admission selection is determined by the Chicago Public Schools Office of Academic Enhancement.

== Fine and Performing Arts Magnet Cluster Program ==
Pritzker is a magnet cluster school specializing in the fine and performing arts which include visual arts, music, dance and drama. Pritzker's Fine and Performing Arts program integrates the arts into core subject areas and includes partnerships with various arts/cultural organizations in the Chicago area. A "magnet-cluster school" is a CPS classification for a specialized school with a neighborhood attendance boundary that accepts students who live within that boundary. Students who live outside of the neighborhood attendance boundary are required to submit an application in order to be considered for acceptance and admission.

== History ==
The original name of the school was the “Wicker Park Achievement Skills Center.” It was changed on January 6, 1986 to “A. N. Pritzker School” in honor of the 90th birthday of Abram Nicholas Pritzker, a 1913 graduate of the Wicker Park School. Two construction workers, employees of Coath & Goss Construction Co., found fossils of a giant beaver while digging footings during construction of the school. The bones were found about 6' below the surface either in the bottom of a 2-3' thick peat layer, or on the top of a blue clay layer underneath the peat. The bones represent the extinct beaver Castoroides ohioensis. The specimen consists of a large upper incisor, and the palate of the skull with most of the "cheekteeth". The fossil is in the collections of the Field Museum of Natural History, catalogue number PM 3942.

== Parent–teacher organization ==
The A.N. Pritzker PTO is a non-profit parent–teacher organization whose membership includes all parents, legal guardians and staff of A.N. Pritzker Elementary School. The PTO works to promote open communication and understanding between parents and school staff; to enrich both the academic and arts curriculum and support extracurricular activities through volunteerism fundraising and sponsorship; and to support school and family social interaction.

== Friends of Pritzker ==
A.N. Pritzker school is supported by Friends of Pritzker, a 501(c)(3) organization, whose mission is to support the academic and extracurricular goals of A.N. Pritzker School. Friends of Pritzker achieves their mission through building strategic partnerships in the community, sponsoring innovative art programs and fundraising.
