= Pritzker family =

American family

- Current region: Chicago
- Origin: Kyiv, Ukraine
- Titles: List: United States Secretary of Commerce; Governor of Illinois; First Lady of Illinois; Chair of the Illinois Human Rights Commission

The Pritzker family is an American family engaged in various business enterprises and philanthropy, and one of the wealthiest families in the United States. The family has stayed in the top 10 of Forbes magazine's "America's Richest Families" list since the magazine began such listings in 1982. Its major fortunes started in the 20th century, particularly through the expansion of the Hyatt Hotels Corporation by Jay Pritzker.

Family members still largely own Hyatt and owned the Marmon Group, a conglomerate of manufacturing and industrial service companies prior to its sale to Berkshire Hathaway. They have also had holdings in the Superior Bank of Chicago (which collapsed in 2001), the TransUnion credit bureau, Braniff airlines, McCall's magazine, and the Royal Caribbean International cruise line.

The Pritzker family is of Jewish descent and based in Chicago. Yakov "Jacob" Pritzker (1831–1896), was the manager of a sugar factory in Kyiv Governorate in the territory of modern Ukraine. At first he lived with his family in the village of Velyki Pritzky, then in Kyiv. He and his family emigrated to the United States from the Russian Empire towards the end of the 19th century, to escape the pogroms there.

== Family fortune ==
In 1995, Jay Pritzker stepped down and Thomas Pritzker took control of The Pritzker Organization. When Jay died in 1999, the family split the business into 11 pieces worth $1.4 billion each (choosing to settle a lawsuit from two family members, who apparently received $500 million each in 2005). By 2011, the dissolution had been completed and the cousins had gone their separate ways, with some pursuing business and others philanthropic or artistic ventures. According to Inside Philanthropy, many Pritzkers have numerous vehicles or foundations for giving philanthropically.

== Genealogy ==
- Yakov Pritzker (1831–1896) and Sophia Schwarzman (1850–1910), Ukrainian-Jewish immigrants from Kyiv to Chicago
  - Nicholas Pritzker (1871–1957), immigrant from Kyiv as a child, founder of Pritzker & Pritzker law firm in Chicago and a cousin of the existentialist philosopher Lev Shestov (Schwartzman), married Annie P. Cohn
    - Harry Nicholas Pritzker (1893–1957), a lawyer at Pritzker and Pritzker law firm, married Elna Stone
      - Richard S. Pritzker (1944–2015), married Lori Hart
      - Joanne Pritzker (1946–1955)
    - Abram Nicholas Pritzker (1896–1986), patriarch of the family business enterprise, married Fanny Doppelt
      - Jay Pritzker (1922–1999), co-founder of Hyatt, philanthropist, co-founder of the Pritzker Prize, with his wife, Marian "Cindy" Friend
        - Nancy Pritzker (1948–1972)
        - Thomas Pritzker (born 1950), chief executive of The Pritzker Organization, executive chairman of Hyatt Hotels, married Margot Marshall
        - John Pritzker (born 1953), married Lisa Stone, 3 children
          - Adam Pritzker (born 1984), co-founder and chair of General Assembly, Columbia University trustee, married Sophie McNally
          - Noah Pritzker (born 1986), film director
        - Daniel Pritzker (born 1959), founder, guitarist, and songwriter for the band Sonia Dada, and documentary filmmaker, married Karen Edensword
        - Jean (Gigi) Pritzker (born 1962), filmmaker, married Michael Pucker
      - Robert Pritzker (1926–2011), founder of Marmon Group and philanthropist, married to Audrey Gilbert (3 children), Irene Dryburgh (2 children), and Mayari Sargent
        - Jennifer N. Pritzker (born 1950), Colonel (Ret), Illinois Army National Guard, founder of the Pritzker Military Museum & Library
        - Linda Pritzker (born 1953), Tibetan Buddhist lama, author
          - Rachel Pritzker
        - Karen Pritzker (born 1958), married Michael Vlock
        - Matthew Pritzker (born 1982)
        - Liesel Pritzker (born 1984), actress, married Ian Simmons
      - Donald Pritzker (1932–1972), co-founder and president of Hyatt, married Sue Sandel, 3 children
        - Penny Pritzker (born 1959), 38th United States Secretary of Commerce, chair and CEO of PSP Capital Partners and Artemis Real Estate Partners, 2012 national co-chair of Obama for America, former Stanford University trustee, married Bryan Traubert
        - Anthony Pritzker (born 1961) married Jeanne Kriser
        - JB Pritzker (born 1965), founder of Pritzker Group Venture Capital (formerly New World Ventures), co-founder of Pritzker Group, Governor of Illinois (2019–present), national co-chair of the Hillary Clinton 2008 presidential campaign, married Mary K. Muenster
    - Jack Nicholas Pritzker (1904–1979), real estate developer and lawyer, married Rhoda Goldberg (1914–2007)
      - Nicholas J. Pritzker (born 1944), chair of the board and CEO of the Hyatt Development Corporation, married Susan Stowell

== Family members fortune ==
Members of the Pritzker family on the Forbes The World's Billionaires List of "the richest people in the world" in 2024:

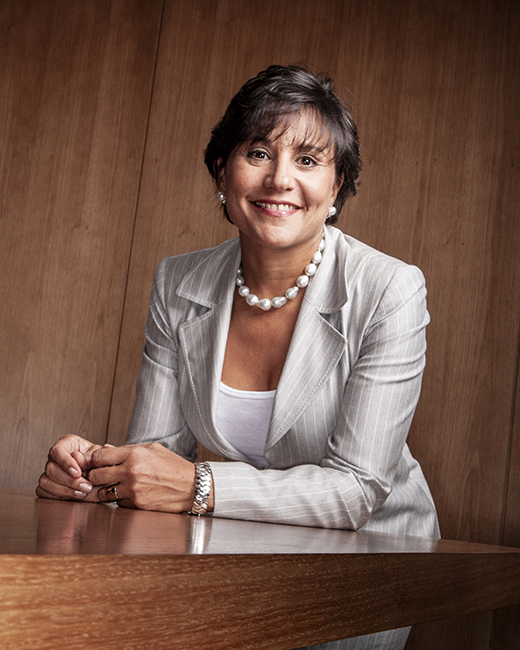
Penny Pritzker in 2008

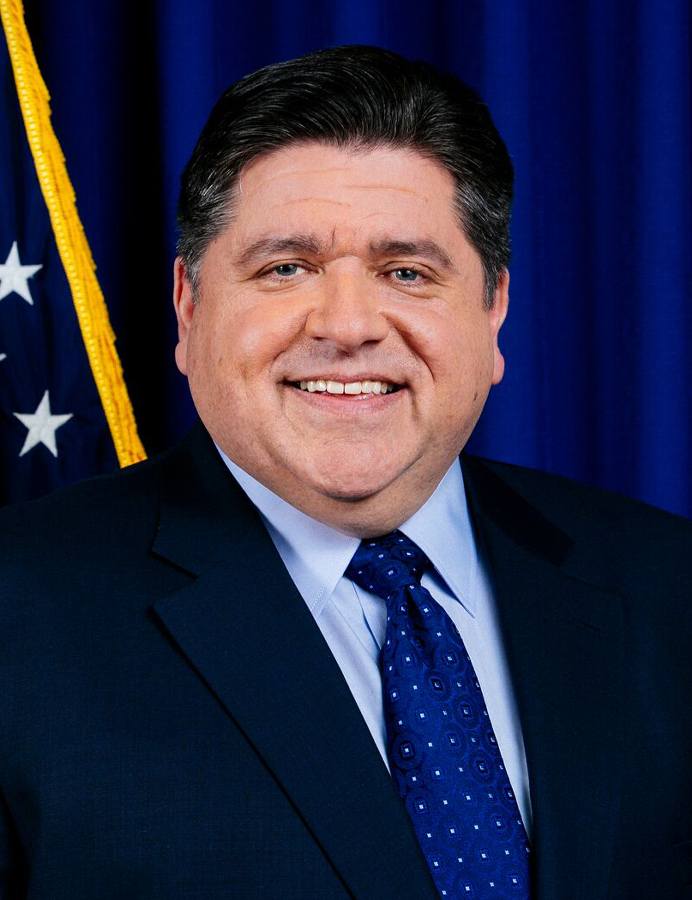
J.B. Pritzker in 2019

Rank	Name	Net worth
409	Thomas Pritzker	$6.7 billion
477	Karen Pritzker	$6.1 billion
597	Jean (Gigi) Pritzker	$5.1 billion
871	Anthony Pritzker	$3.7 billion
871	Penny Pritzker	$3.7 billion
920	JB Pritzker	$3.5 billion
1,238	John Pritzker	$2.7 billion
1,286	Daniel Pritzker	$2.6 billion
1,496	Jennifer Pritzker	$2.2 billion
1,623	Linda Pritzker	$2 billion
1,851	Matthew Pritzker	$1.7 billion
1,945	Nicholas J. Pritzker	$1.6 billion
2,046	Liesel Pritzker Simmons	$1.5 billion
	Total	$43.1 billion

== Legacy ==
- A.N. Pritzker Elementary School
- Jay Pritzker Pavilion at Chicago's Millennium Park
- Nancy Friend Pritzker Psychiatry Building at the University of California, San Francisco
- Pritzker Student Center at [St. John’s College], Santa Fe Campus. Renovated 2024-2026
- Pritzker Architecture Prize
- Pritzker Family Children's Zoo at the Lincoln Park Zoo
- Pritzker College Prep, a Campus of the Noble Network of Charter High Schools
- Pritzker Institute of Biomedical Science and Engineering at the Illinois Institute of Technology
- Pritzker School of Law at Northwestern University
  - Pritzker Legal Research Center at Northwestern
- Pritzker Hall at the University of California, Los Angeles
- Pritzker School of Medicine at the University of Chicago (UChicago)
- Pritzker School of Molecular Engineering at UChicago
- Pritzker Marine Biological Research Center at New College of Florida
- Pritzker Galleries of Impressionism and Post-Impressionism at the Art Institute of Chicago
- Pritzker Traubert Family Library at the University of Chicago Laboratory Schools
- The Pritzker Organization
- Pritzker Edition of Zohar (the Book of Radiance), translation & commentary by Daniel Matt and, for last 3 volumes, Nathan Wolski and Joel Hecker; 12 vols, Stanford University Press, 1997–2017
- Pritzker Military Museum and Library
- Robert A. Pritzker Center for Meteoritics and Polar Studies in the Field Museum of Natural History
- Pritzker Department of Psychiatry and Behavioral Health in the Lurie Children's Hospital

== See also ==
- The Pritzker Estate
- List of largest houses in the Los Angeles Metropolitan Area
- List of largest houses in the United States
