= Marmon Group =

American industrial holding company

Marmon Holdings, Inc.
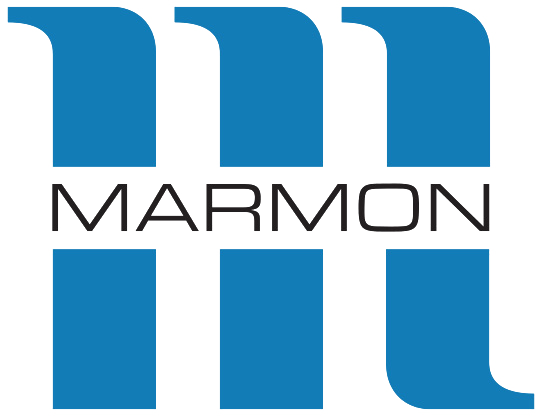
- Type: Subsidiary
- Industry: Medical device, Rail transport, Electrical and other industrial components, Food, Beverage & Water, and Retail services
- Founded: 1953; 73 years ago in United States (as Colson Corporation)
- Headquarters: 181 West Madison Street, Chicago, Illinois, United States
- Key people: Angelo Pantaleo (CEO)
- Owner: Berkshire Hathaway
- Website: www.marmon.com

Marmon Group is an American industrial holding company headquartered in Chicago, Illinois. Founded by Jay Pritzker and Robert Pritzker in 1953 (as Colson Corporation), it has been held by the Berkshire Hathaway group since 2013.

Marmon Group primarily focuses on the industrial space, including companies that produce transportation equipment, electrical components, other industrial components, as well as service-based companies providing services in the construction and retail sectors.

Tank car manufacturing is a significant part of its business, including products which are sold through its subsidiaries Union Tank Car Company in the United States and Procor in Canada. Berkshire Hathaway acquired controlling interest in Marmon in 2007 and became sole owner in 2013.

== Origin and history ==
In 1953, Jay Pritzker and Robert Pritzker acquired Colson Corporation, a struggling manufacturer of casters, bicycles, navy rockets, and wheelchairs with sales of $3 million.

The name of the company was changed to Marmon Group in 1964, after the acquisition of Marmon-Herrington. Major acquisitions by Marmon Group have included Cerro Corporation (1976) and TransUnion (1981).

In 2008, the Pritzker family sold a 63.6 percent interest in Marmon Group to Berkshire Hathaway for $4.8 billion, with plans for Berkshire to acquire the remaining 36.4% over the course of the next 5–6 years; the sale of the remaining stake to Berkshire was completed by 2013.

== Subsidiaries ==
The following is a list of subsidiaries of the Marmon Group:

- Amarillo Gear Company LLC
  - Amarillo Gear Service
- Amarillo Wind Machine LLC
- Anderson Copper and Brass Company LLC
- AP Emissions Technologies Inc.
- Astha Sterling Crane Plc (India)
  - Procrane Sales Inc.
- Atlas Bolt & Screw Company LLC
- Big Red Rooster Flow
- Cable USA LLC
- Campbell Hausfield
- Cannon Equipment
- Catequip S.A.S and Cat'Serv S.A.R.L
- CCPI Europe Ltd
- Cerro Electrical Products
- Cerro E.M.S
- Cerro Fabricated Products LLC
- Cerro Flow Products LLC
- Cerro Plumbing Products
- Cerro Wire LLC
- Colson Associates Inc
- Commercial Zone Products
- Comtran Cable LLC
- DCI Marketing
- Dekoron Unitherm LLC
- Dekoron Wire & Cable LLC
- Display Technologies LLC
- Dominioni
- Ecodyne Heat Exchangers LLC
- Ecodyne Ltd
- EcoWater Canada Ltd
- EcoWater Systems Europe
- EcoWater Systems LLC
- Eden
- Enersul Inc.
- Epuro
- EXSIF Worldwide Inc.
- Filtrex Technologies
- Focused Technology Solutions, Inc.
- Fontaine Commercial Trailer Inc.
- Fontaine Fifth Wheel Company
- Fontaine Modification Company
- Fontaine Specialized
- Fontaine Spray Suppression Company
- Freo Group Pty Ltd (Australia)
- Future Metals
- Gendon Polymer Services Inc.
- Graver Technologies LLC
- Graver Water Systems LLC
- Harbour Industries LLC
- Jomac Canada
- Joyce Crane
- Kentucky Trailer
- Koehler-Bright Star LLC
- KX Technologies LLC
- L.A. Darling Company LLC
- Leader Metal Industry Co. Ltd
- Lindenau Full Tank Services GmbH
- M/K Express Company LLC
- Marmon Aerospace & Defense, LLC, dba RSCC Aerospace and Defense
- Marmon Foodservice Technologies, Inc.
  - Cornelius
    - Silver King
  - Prince Castle
- Marmon Utility LLC (Hendrix)
  - Hendrix Wire and Cable, Inc.
- Marmon Utility LLC (Kerite)
- Marmon/Keystone Canada Inc.
- Marmon/Keystone LLC
  - Bushwick Metals LLC
    - AZCO Steel
    - Bushwick-Fisher Steel Company
    - Bushwick-Koons Steel
    - Tarco Steel
  - Future Metals LLC
- Marmon-Herrington Company
- McKenzie Valve & Machining LLC
- Midwest Plastic Fabricators
- Nylok LLC
- Owl Wire and Cable LLC
- Pan American Screw LLC
- Penn Aluminum International LLC
- Penn Machine Company LLC
- Perfection
- Procoves Industrie
- Project CSI
- Radiant-RSCC Speciality Cable Private Ltd (India)
- Railserve Inc.
  - Ameritrack Rail
- Retail Space Solutions
- RLS Press Fittings
- Robertson Inc.
- RSCC Wire & Cable LLC
- Sisu Axles Inc.
- Sonnax Transmission Company, Inc.
- Sterling Crane (North America)
- Store Opening Solutions LLC
- Streater LLC
- TBS Engineering Ltd.
- Tenn-Tex Plastics
- TE Wire & Cable LLC
- Thorco Industries LLC
- 3Wire Group Inc.
- Trackmobile LLC
- Trade Fixtures LLC
- Transco Railway Products
- Triangle Suspension Systems Inc.
- TSE Brakes Inc.
- Tucker Safety Products
- Unarco Industries LLC
- Uni-Form Components Co.
- United Consumer Financial Services
- Union Tank Car Company
  - Procor Ltd
- Webb Wheel Products
- Wells Lamont Industrial
- Wells Lamont Retail Group
- Western Builders Supply Inc.
- Wilbert Funeral Services
