= InMoment =

American software company

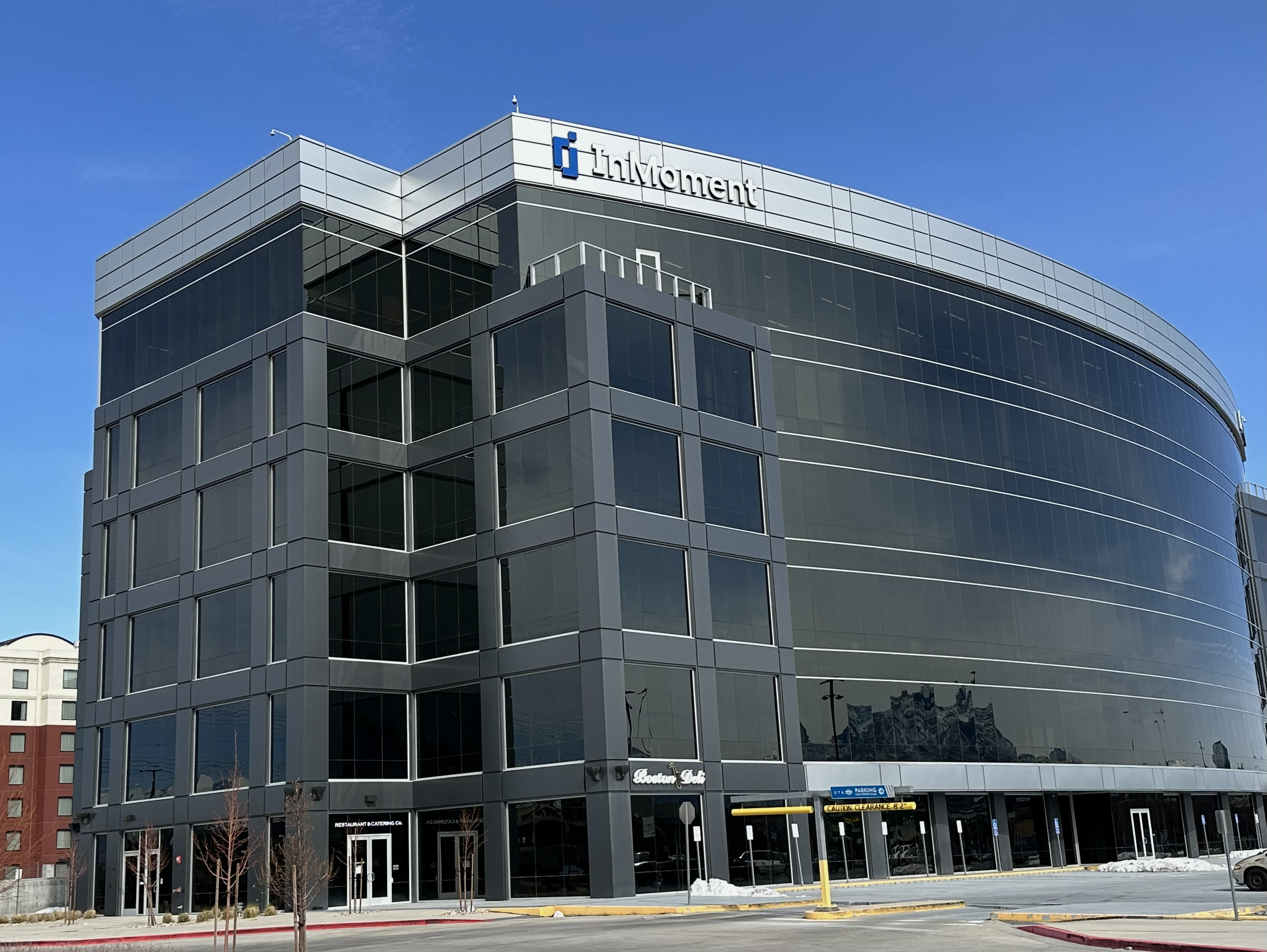
- Headquarters in South Jordan, Utah
- Industry: Customer experience Experience management
- Predecessor: Mindshare Technologies
- Founded: 2002
- Founders: John Sperry; Kurt Williams; Richard D. Hanks
- Headquarters: Salt Lake City, Utah, United States
- Area served: Worldwide
- Key people: John Lewis (Chairman and chief executive officer)
- Brands: Lexalytics; ReviewTrackers; Wootric
- Website: https://inmoment.com/

InMoment is an American multinational software company headquartered in Salt Lake City, Utah. The company was originally founded as Mindshare Technologies by John Sperry, and Kurt Williams, and Richard D. Hanks in 2002. The current chair and chief executive officer (CEO) is John Lewis. The company provides businesses with insights on customers and employees from information such as comments, surveys, and review data and provides cloud-based software to collect and analyze data from voice, text, and video.

== History ==
=== Mindshare Technologies ===
John Sperry, and Kurt Williams, and Richard D. Hanks co-founded Mindshare Technologies with an initial investment of $40,000 in 2002. The company provided customer insights and surveys for Quick-Serve Restaurant (QSR) Chains. By 2011, the company had 85 employees and $18 million in annual revenue. In 2013, the company acquired Empathica, a social customer experience and social media technology company, doubling the size of the company. After the acquisition, Mindshare Technologies was renamed InMoment.

=== InMoment ===
In 2017, Andrew Joiner was appointed CEO. Founding CEO John Sperry remained chief scientist and chairman of InMoment's board of directors. In 2018, the company acquired BrandXP, a customer experience consulting firm, expanding offices into New Zealand and Australia.

In 2020, MaritzCX merged with InMoment, retaining the InMoment brand. The deal was backed by private equity firm Madison Dearborn Partners.

In 2021, the company acquired Wootric, an AI-powered platform to measure and boost customer satisfaction. In the same year, InMoment acquired Lexalytics, a language processing and analytics company. In 2022, InMoment acquired ReviewTrackers, a customer review and reputation management software company. In the same year, InMoment's platform became WCAG 2.0 Compliant.

== Product ==
The InMoment Experience Improvement (XI) Platform is a cloud-based software that collects structured and unstructured data. The platform uses artificial intelligence and text analytic software to process data into insights for improving customer experience, product experience, and employee retention.

== See also ==
- Customer experience
- Experience management
