= Union Tank Car Company =

Railway equipment company

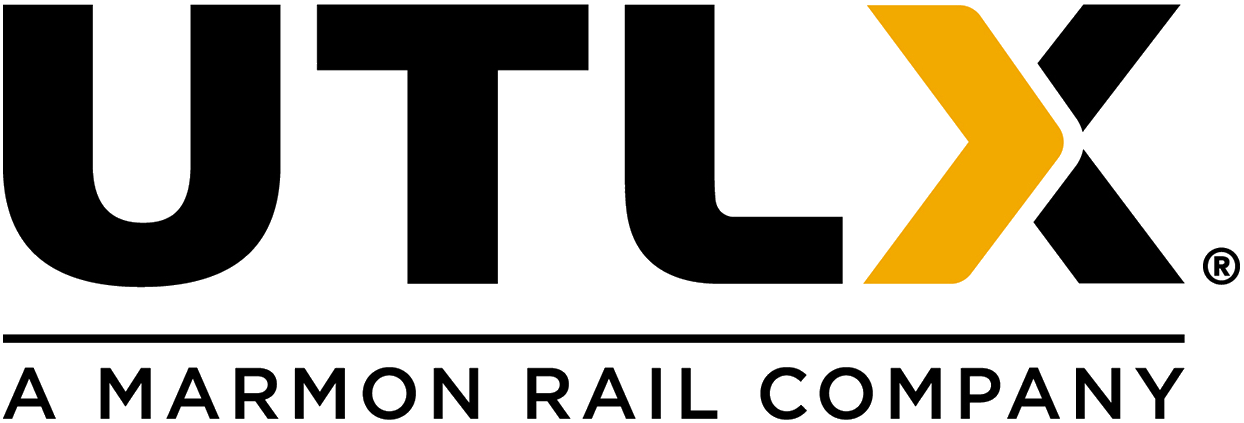

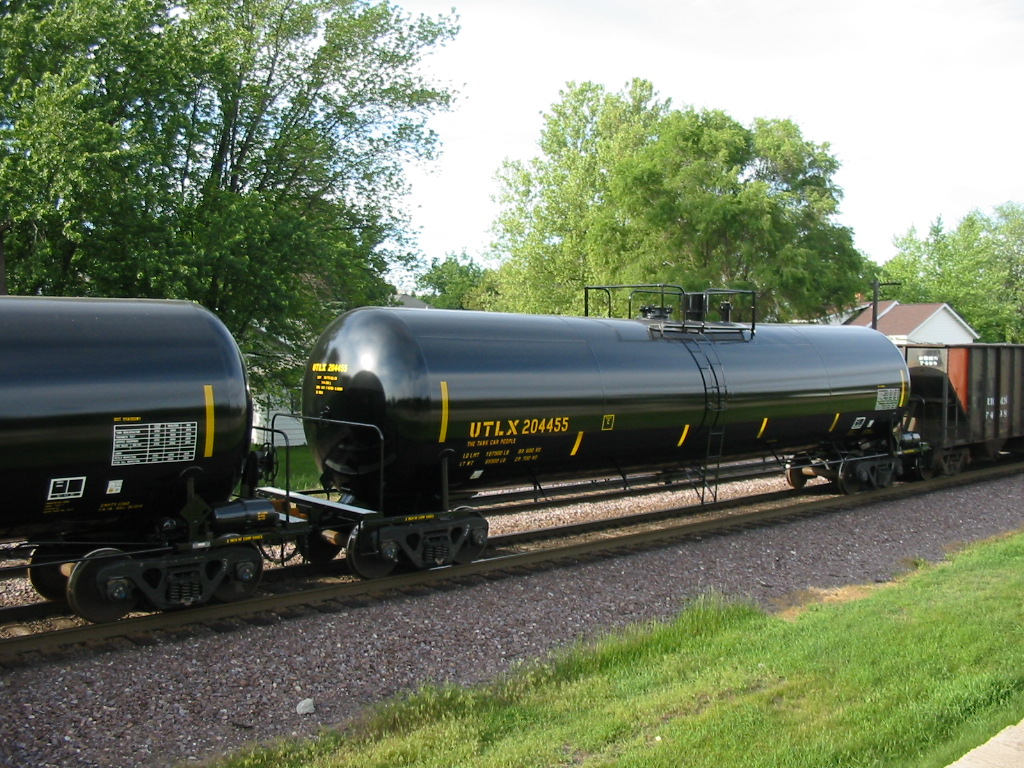
- A UTLX tank car passes westbound through Rochelle Railroad Park in Rochelle, Illinois, on May 29, 2005
- Formerly: Star Tank Line (1873–1891); Union Tank Line Co. (1891–1919)
- Type: Subsidiary
- Industry: Transport
- Founded: 1866; 160 years ago
- Founder: Jacob Vandegrift
- Headquarters: Chicago, United States
- Products: Tank cars, hopper cars
- Owner: Berkshire Hathaway (2007)
- Parent: Marmon Group (1981–present); TransUnion (1968–1981); Standard Oil (1873–1911)
- Subsidiaries: Procor
- Website: utlx.com

Union Tank Car Company or UTLX is a railway equipment leasing, rail car maintenance, and rail car manufacturing company headquartered in metro Chicago, Illinois. A direct descendant of Standard Oil, the firm today is owned by Berkshire Hathaway.

== History ==
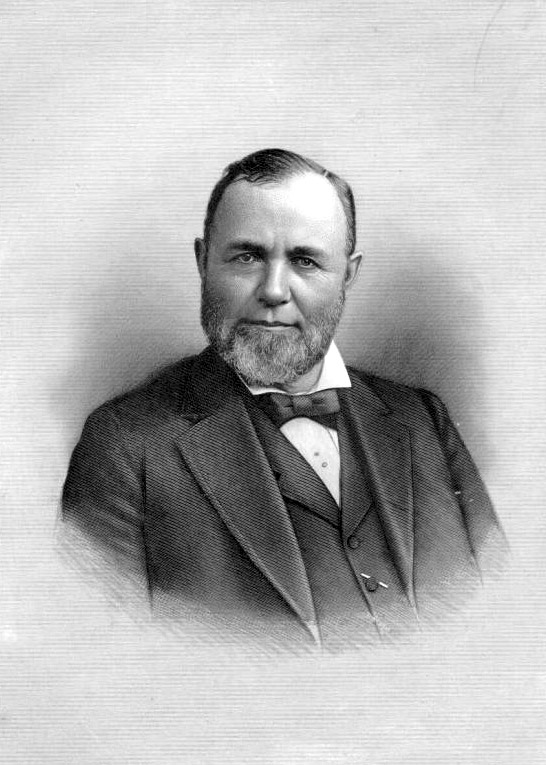
Jacob Vandergrift, oil entrepreneur and founder of Union Tank

The company was founded in 1866 as the "Star Tank Line" by Captain Jacob J. Vandergrift (1827–1899), in response to the economic activities of John D. Rockefeller in the years leading up to his creation of Standard Oil. Vandergrift was involved in the conflicts in the oil regions of Western Pennsylvania in the 1860s–1870s. Eventually, Union Tank Car Company and Vandergrift's other holdings, which included pipeline and riverboat transport companies, merged with the company that later became Standard Oil. Rockefeller, once Vandergrift's nemesis, made him Vice President of Standard Oil. The town of Vandergrift, Pennsylvania, built in 1895 by steel company president George G. McMurtry to house his workers, was named in Vandergrift's honor. Vandergrift is regarded as a leader of transforming the shipment of oil.

The first generation of wooden tank cars were introduced to transport petroleum products in 1865, serving the oil fields of Pennsylvania. Four years later, the wooden tanks were replaced by cast iron ones.

In 1873, Standard Oil acquired the Star Tank Line entire fleet for its exclusive use, in an attempt to control petroleum transportation. The Union Tank Car Company was incorporated in 1891 as a subsidiary of Standard Oil Trust as part of an initiative from Rockefeller. After Standard Oil Trust was dissolved by the Government and split into 34 different companies, Union Tank became a public company and began to serve other oil companies, diversifying its clients range.

Union Tank changed its name to "Union Tank Car Company" in 1919. During the Great Depression, the company acquired thousand of tank cars and began leasing them back to shippers, an activity that has continued to date. During the 1920s, the company had a fleet of about 30,000 cars, and moved its operations to Chicago.

In 1952, Union Tank established its Canadian subsidiary, Procor.

The Union Tank's largest tank ever manufactured was the "Whale Belly", with a capacity for 50,000 gallons. It was introduced in 1963 and served for more 20 years.

TransUnion was formed as a holding company in 1968 to hold Union Tank Car Company. TransUnion soon began acquiring credit information and information management companies as a second major investment. The Marmon Group, a conglomerate controlled by the Pritzker family, acquired TransUnion in 1981, spinning off the TransUnion name and the financial portion of the holding company to Madison Dearborn Partners in the 1990s. Union Tank Car Company is still owned by Marmon, which in turn is now a 100% owned subsidiary of Berkshire Hathaway.
