= MaritzCX =

- Company type: Private
- Industry: Market research, customer experience
- Founded: 2015
- Founders: Adam G. Edmunds; Dr. Gary Rhoads
- Defunct: 2020
- Fate: Acquired
- Successor: InMoment
- Headquarters: Lehi, Utah, United States
- Key people: Andrew Joiner (CEO)
- Number of employees: 1,500+ (2020)
- Parent: InMoment
- Website: inmoment.com

MaritzCX was an American customer experience and market research company providing real time consumer data analysis. MaritzCX provided platforms for strategy and design consulting, mystery shopping, data analysis models, comprehensive program management, and data collection and validation services. MaritzCX served the automotive, business-to-business (B2B), consumer technology, financial, government, retail, travel, and hospitality industries.

In February 2020, it was announced that MaritzCX would be acquired by InMoment, another Utah-based customer feedback management company.

MaritzCX was headquartered in Lehi, Utah, and was a subsidiary of the international sales and marketing services company, Maritz Holdings LLC. In addition to its main campus in Utah, the company had offices throughout the United States and Canada as well as the United Kingdom, Germany, and Australia.

== History ==
MaritzCX was formed in January 2015, after Maritz Holdings bought Allegiance, Inc., in November 2014. After working together for several years, the two companies paired Allegiance's innovative CX software and Maritz's research and strategic consulting industries. Emerging as MaritzCX, the firm had over 900 employees and earned nearly $200 million in revenue during its first year.

In June 2017, MaritzCX partnered with a fintech and consultant company Protiviti Inc.

In February 2020, MaritzCX merged with InMoment, retaining the InMoment brand. The deal was backed by private equity firm Madison Dearborn Partners which already had a stake in InMoment since May 2019.

In 2021, InMoment acquires Lexalytics, a language processing and analytics firm.
