= Freight train =

Train used to transport freight

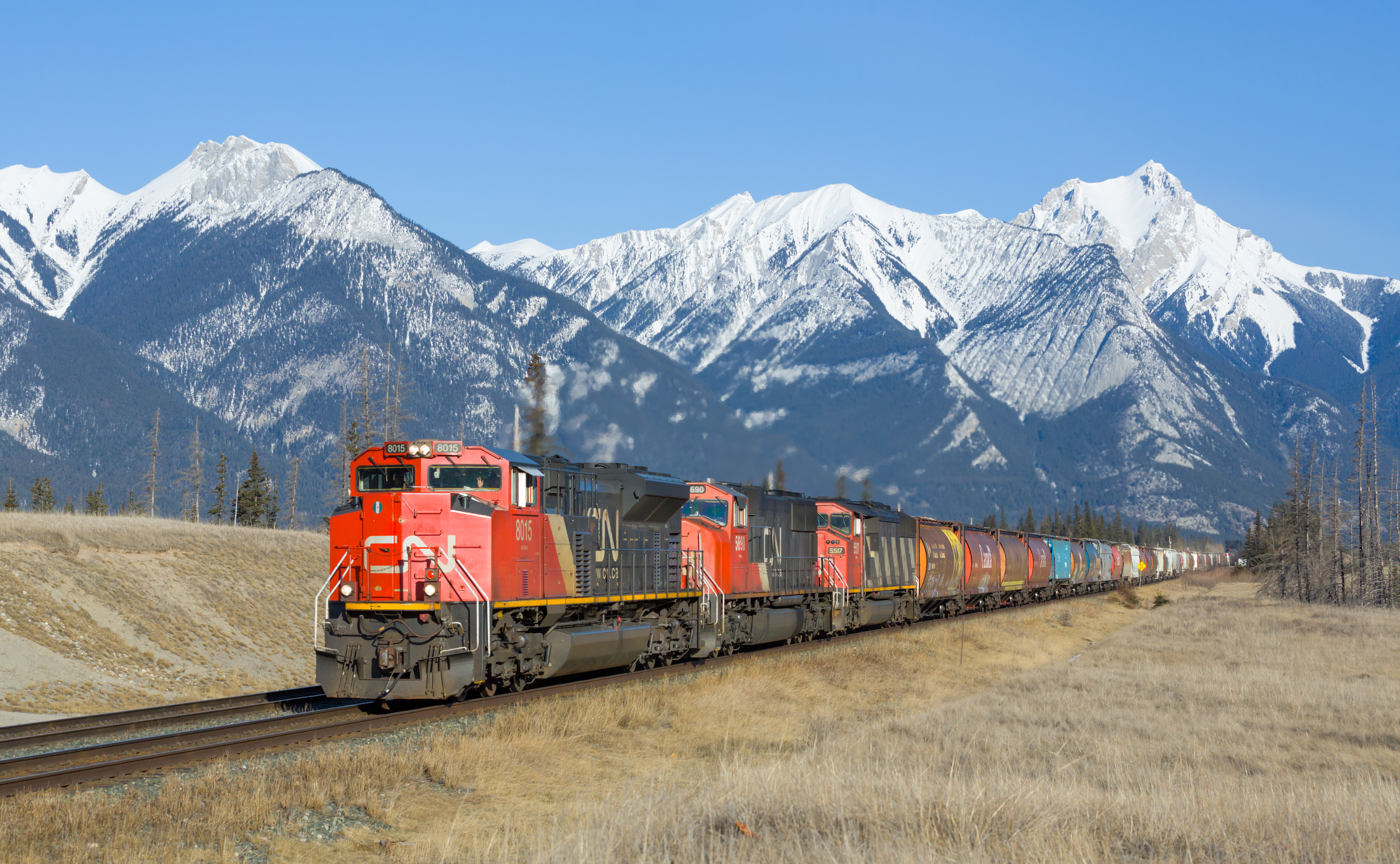
A Canadian National Railway freight train with three locomotives in the Canadian Rockies

A freight train, goods train, or cargo train, is a railway train that is used to carry cargo, as opposed to passengers. Freight trains are made up of one or more locomotives which provide propulsion, along with one or more railroad cars (also known as wagons) which carry freight. A wide variety of cargoes are carried on trains, but the low friction inherent to rail transport means that freight trains are especially suited to carrying bulk and heavy loads over longer distances.

== History ==
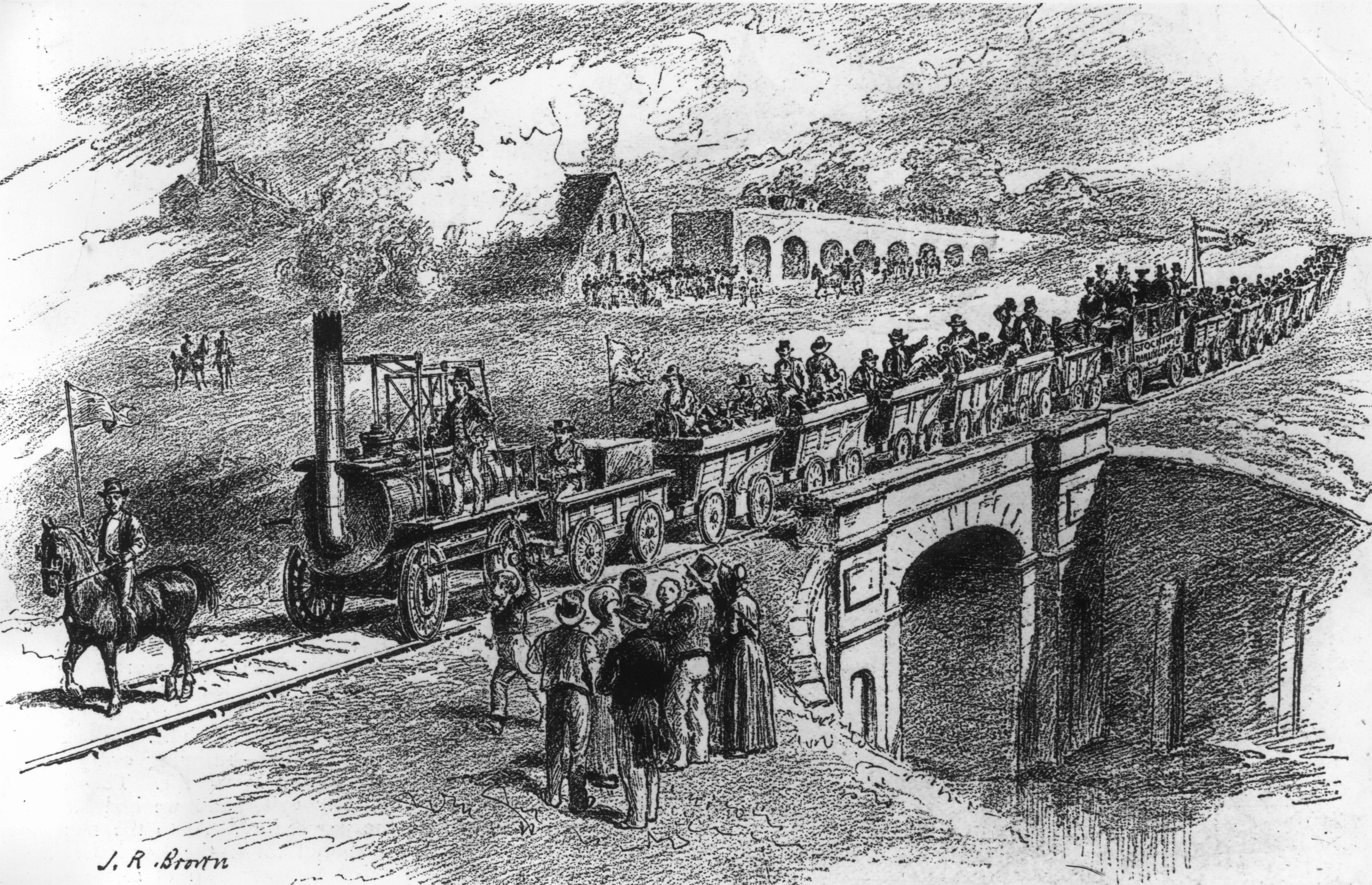
The first train on the Stockton and Darlington Railway in 1825, including six cars of coal

The earliest recorded use of rail transport for freight was in Babylon, circa 2200 BCE. This use took the form of wagons pulled on wagonways by horses or even humans.

== Locomotives ==
Freight trains are almost universally powered by locomotives. Historically, steam locomotives were predominant, but beginning in the 1920s diesel and electric locomotives displaced steam due to their greater reliability, cleaner emissions, and lower costs.

== Freight cars ==
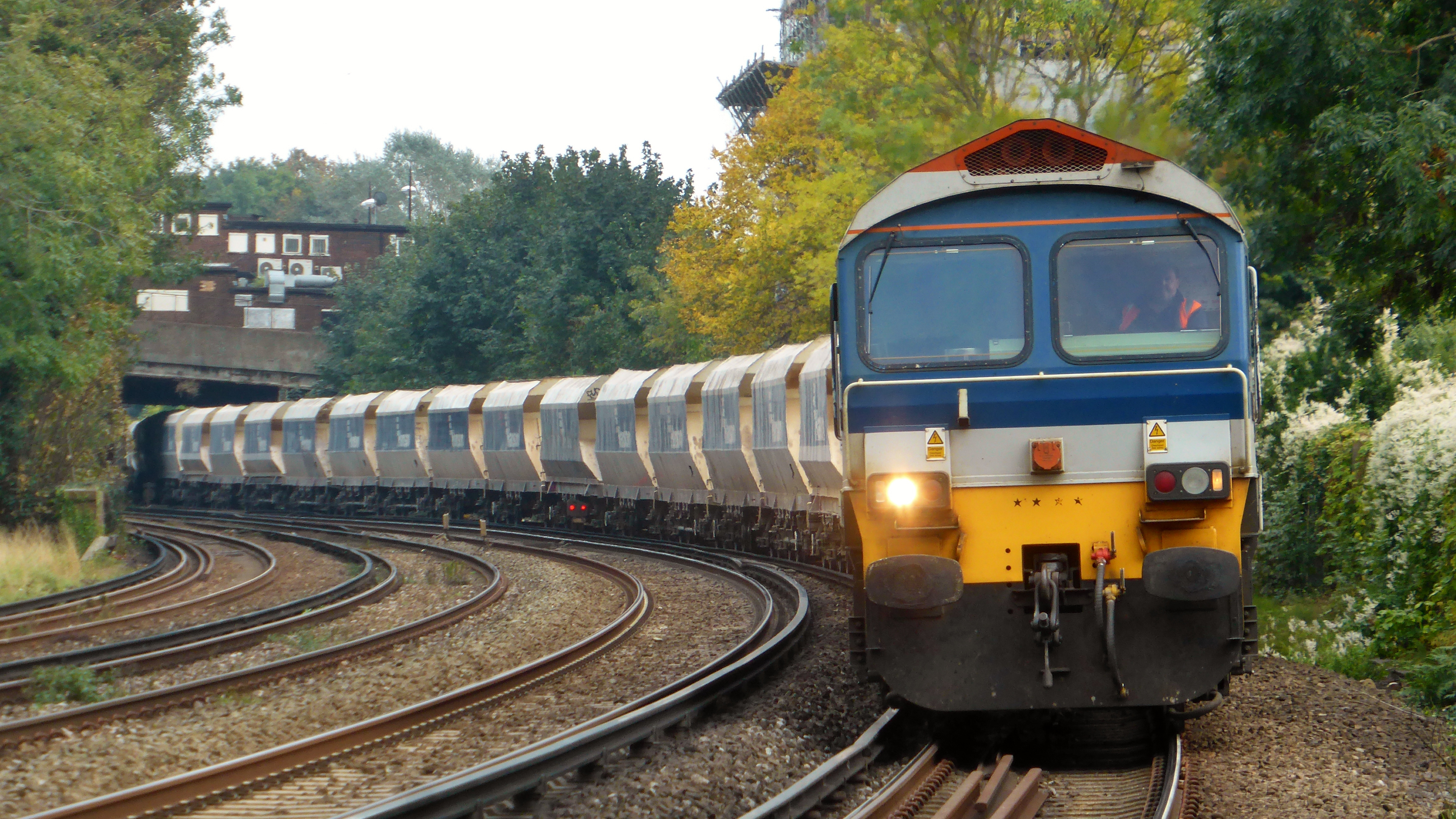
A unit train with cargo from a quarry in the United Kingdom

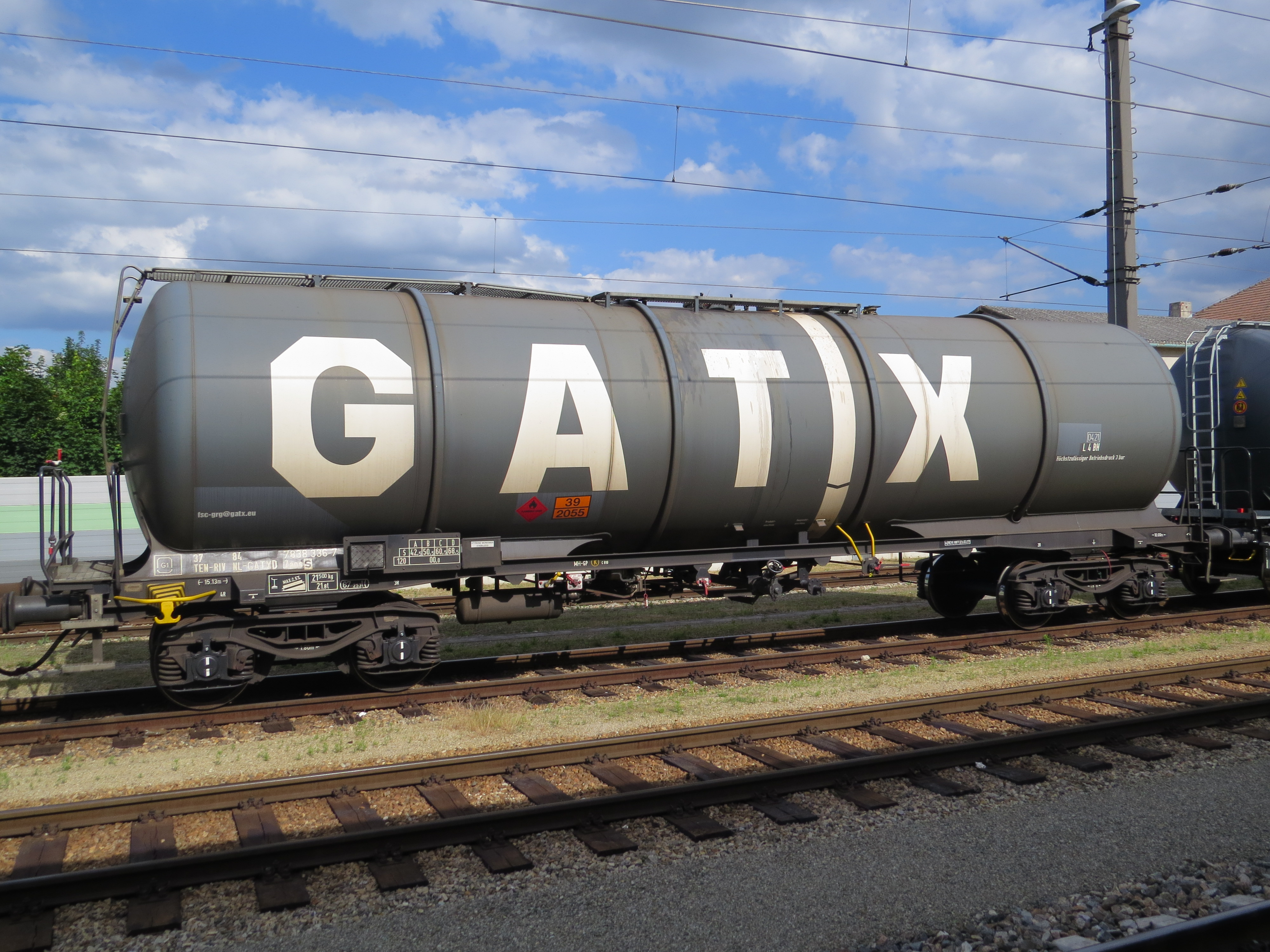
A tank car in Germany, used to carry liquids and gases

Freight trains carry cargo in freight cars, also known as goods wagons, which are unpowered and designed to carry various types of goods.

Different types of freight cars may be used by a train, such as:

- Boxcar
- Tank Car
- Hopper Car
  - Covered Hopper Car
- Centerbeam Car
- Flatcar
- Intermodal Well Car
- Gondola Car
- Autorack Car

As of April 2020, there were 1.6 million rail cars in North America.

== Operations ==
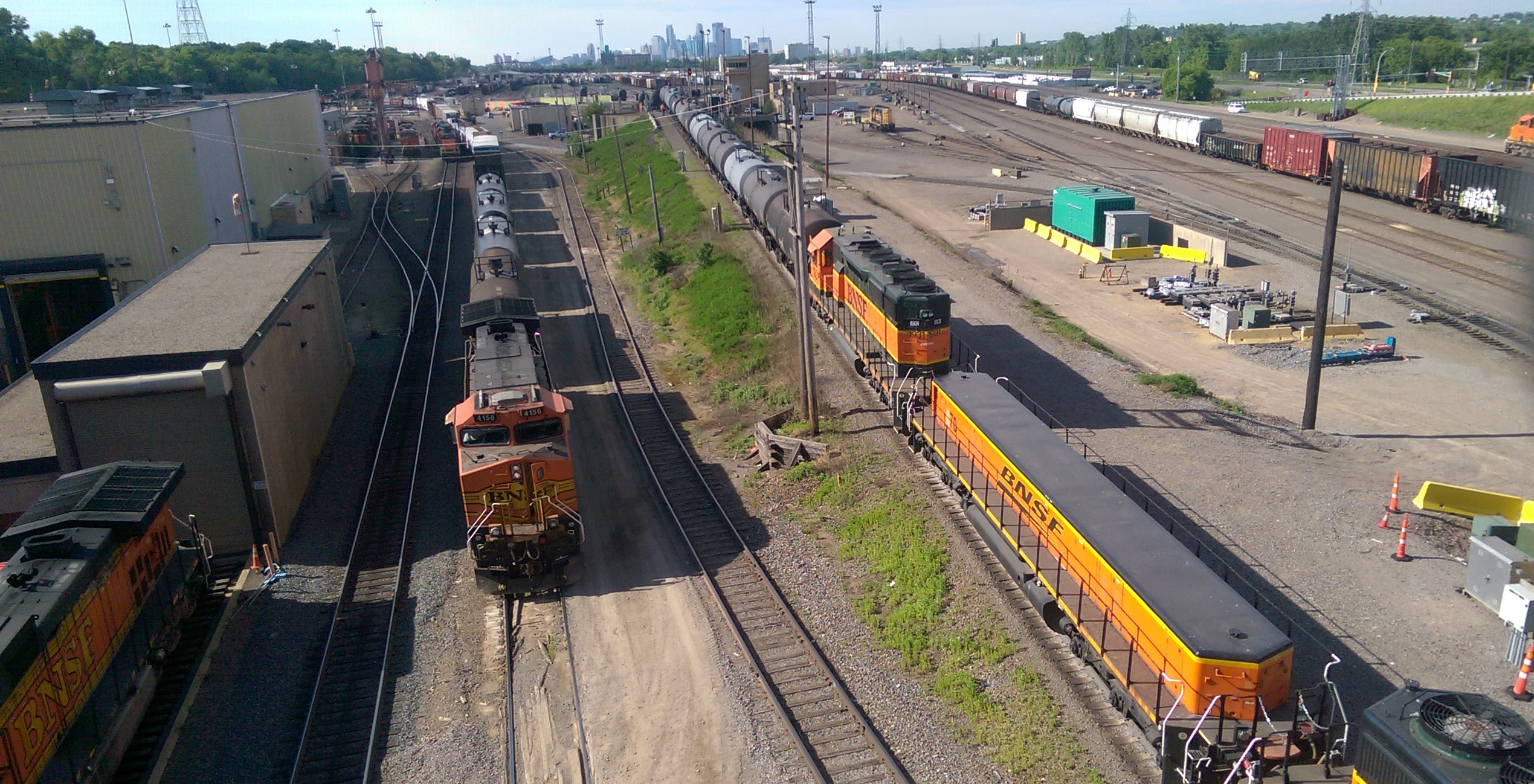
A BNSF Railway classification yard in Minnesota, USA

Freight trains often operate between classification yards, which are hubs where incoming freight trains are received, and then broken up, with the cars then being assembled into new trains for other destinations. In contrast to this type of operation, which is known as wagonload (or carload) freight, there are also unit trains, which exclusively carry one type of cargo. They normally operate directly between origin and destination points, such as a coal mine and a power plant, without any changes to the makeup of the freight cars in between. This allows cargo to reach its destination faster, and increases utilization of freight cars, lowering operating costs.

Unlike passenger trains, freight trains often do not follow fixed schedules, but are run as needed. When sharing tracks with passenger trains, freight trains are scheduled to use lines during specific times to minimize their impact on passenger train operations, especially during the morning and evening rush hours.

== See also ==
- Intermodal freight transport where containerized cargo is changed between freight train, to truck, or ship

== Bibliography ==
- Herring, Peter (2000). Ultimate Train. Dorling Kindersley. ISBN 0-7894-4610-3. OCLC 42810706. OL 8155464M.
