= Paul Finnegan =

American investor and philanthropist (born 1953)

- Born: Paul James Finnegan; 72–73; Scituate, Massachusetts
- Education: Harvard University
- Occupations: Investor and philanthropist
- Known for: Founder and co-CEO of Madison Dearborn Partners; Treasurer of the Harvard Corporation
- Spouse: Mary Finnegan

Paul James Finnegan (born 1953) is a Chicago-based investor and philanthropist. In 1992, he co-founded Madison Dearborn Partners and currently serves as the firm's co-CEO. From 2014 to 2023, served as the Treasurer of the Harvard Corporation and the Chair of the Harvard Management Company.

== Life ==
Finnegan was born and raised in Massachusetts and attended Phillips Academy in Andover, graduating in 1971. He graduated from Harvard in 1975, where he was a member of the college's ski team. He also attended Harvard Business School.

== Business career ==
In 1992, Finnegan co-founded Madison Dearborn. He has served as co-CEO since 2007, when fellow co-founder and then-CEO John Canning Jr. was looking to buy the Chicago Cubs.

Finnegan is also a director at AIA Corporation, CDW, Government Sourcing Solutions LLC, and the Chicago Council on Global Affairs.

He is a major donor in Illinois politics, having donated $100,000 to Rahm Emanuel's campaign for mayor in 2015 and another $200,000 to Emanuel's aborted run for mayor in 2019.

== Philanthropy and non-profit work ==
Through the Finnegan Family Foundation, he has donated to causes in the areas of education, youth, health, and local Chicago community.

Finnegan has been a member of the Harvard Corporation since 2012, and has served as it treasurer since replacing Jim Rothenberg in 2014. He was on the search committee that selected Larry Bacow as the 29th President of Harvard University.

Finnegan serves of the board of Teach For America and a variety of Chicago metropolitan area non-profits.
