= Procor =

Rolling stock manufacturer

Procor Limited

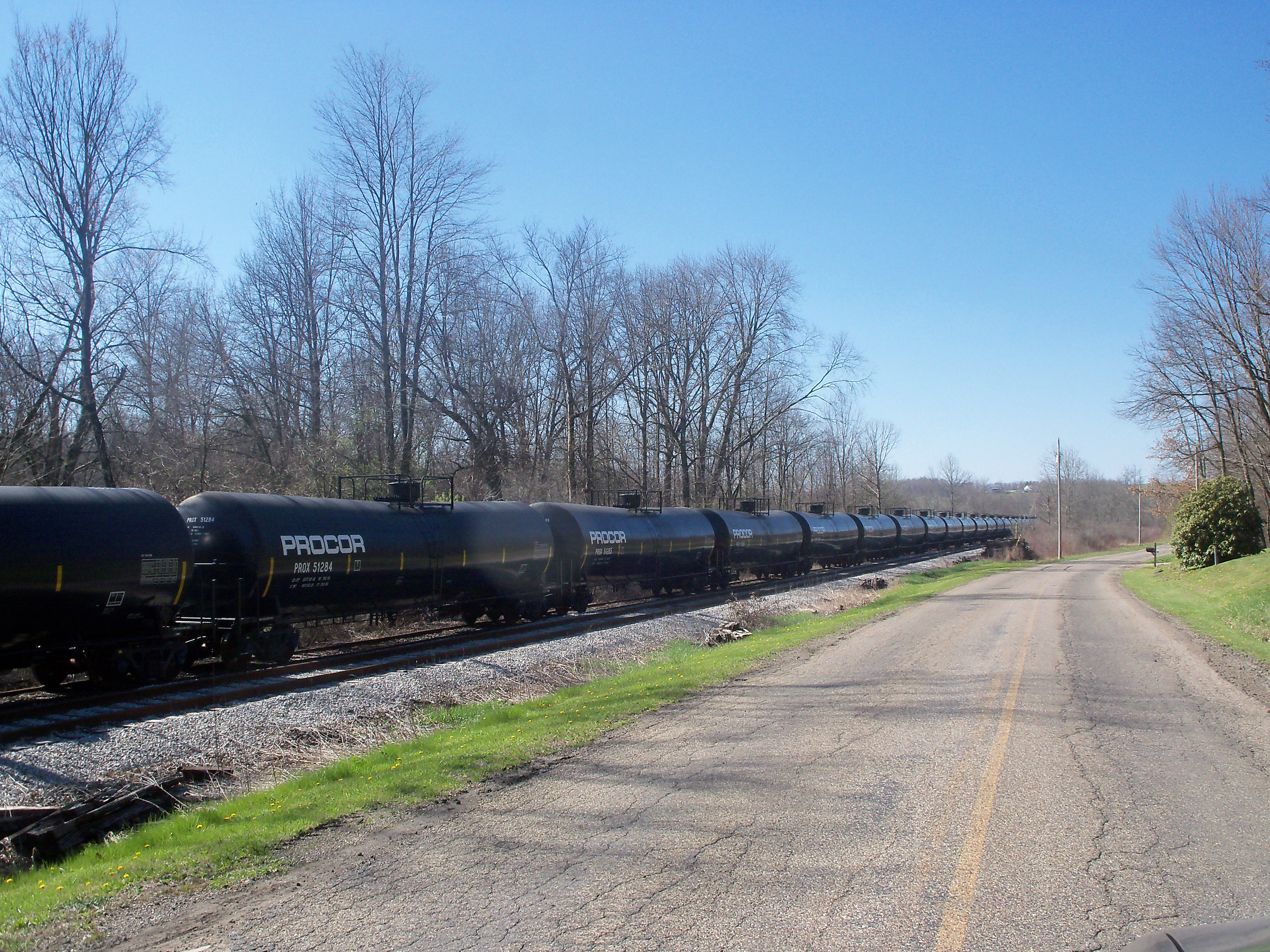
- Industry: Special railcar leasing and repair
- Founded: 1952; 74 years ago in Canada (as Products Tank Line Limited)
- Headquarters: Oakville, Ontario, Canada
- Products: Tank car, Hopper car, Gondola car (before 2002)
- Parent: Union Tank Car Company (since 1952)
- Website: www.procor.com

Procor is a Canadian company producing railway shipping cars. It is Canada's largest private rail car rental fleet, with more than 30,000 conventional and special-purpose tank and freight cars.

Linked to Sparling Tank Car of Toronto, Procor was founded in 1952 as Products Tank Line Limited and became an affiliate of US-based Union Tank Car Company. The company, which shortened its name to Procor in 1962, is headquartered in Oakville, Ontario.

== Manufacturing and Repair ==
Procor manufactured cars in its Oakville shops until 2002, but now sources from parent Union Tank Car's plant in Alexandria, Louisiana and Sheldon, Texas.

List of cars once manufactured by Procor:

- Hopper car
- Tank car - (sulphuric acid, LPG, ethanol)
- Funnel flow tank car
- Coal gondola

Procor operates from numerous locations across Canada.

=== Repair shops ===
- Joffre, Alberta
- Edmonton, Alberta
- Regina, Saskatchewan
- Sarnia, Ontario
- Oakville, Ontario

=== Mobile/mini shops ===
- Regina West
- Prince George, British Columbia
- North Vancouver, British Columbia
- Trail, British Columbia
- Waterton, Alberta
- Joffre, Alberta
- Edmonton, Alberta
- Winnipeg, Manitoba
- Greater Sudbury, Ontario
- Nanticoke, Ontario
- Montreal, Quebec

== See also ==
- Horbury railway works - Procor's British unit from 1974 to 1990
