= Magnetic level gauge =

Measuring instrument

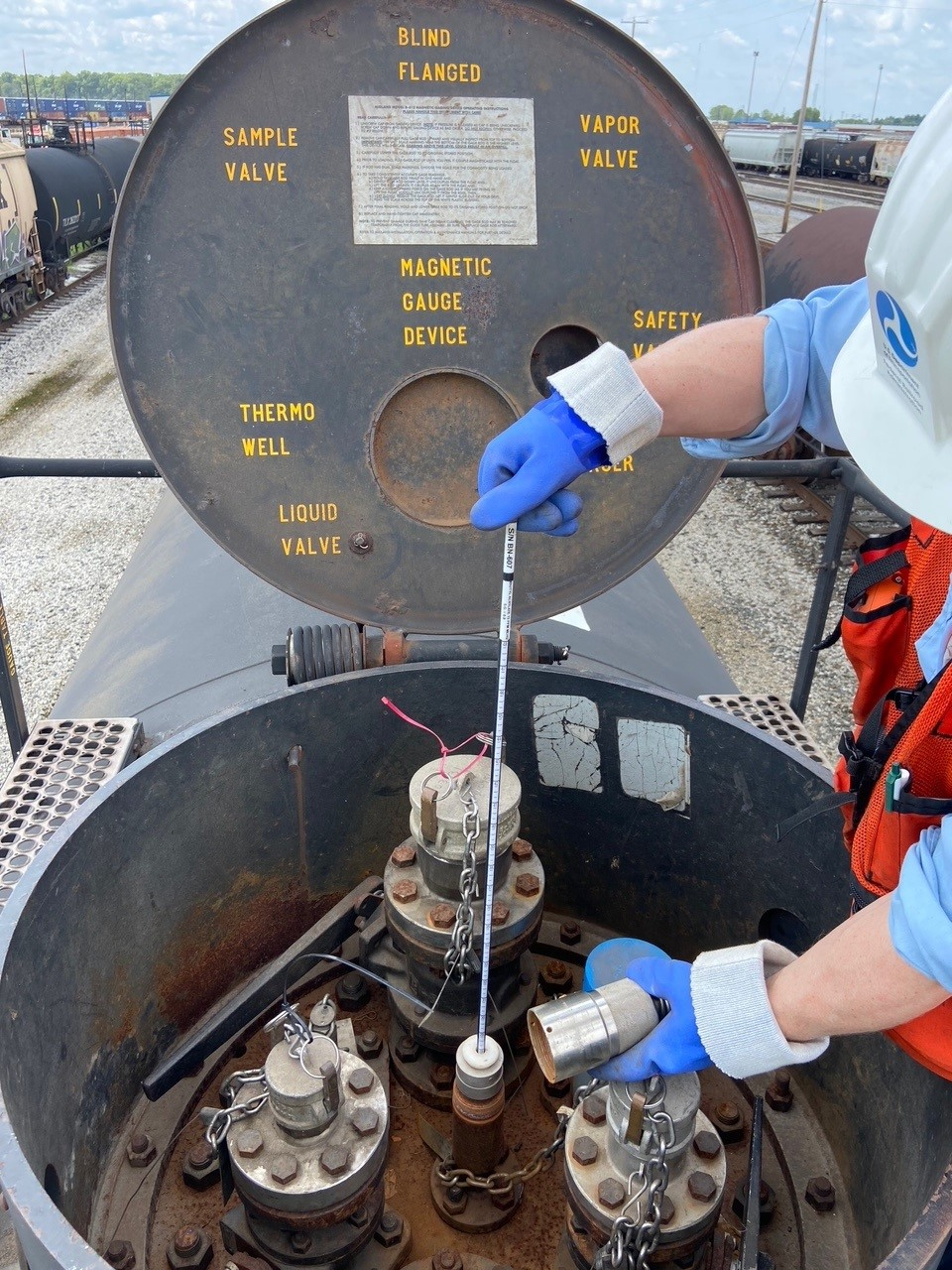
A magnetic level gauge pulled out from inside the valve housing on top of a railway tank car in the United States

A magnetic level gauge is a level gauge based on a float device that can experience floatation in both high and low density fluids. Magnetic level gauges may also be designed to accommodate severe environmental conditions up to 210 bars at 370 °C.

Unlike a sight glass, magnetic level gauges do not need to be transparent and can be made out of metal, which increases the durability and operating temperature range of the device.

== Design ==
Magnetic float level sensors involve the use of a permanent magnet sealed inside a float whose rise and fall causes the opening or closing of a mechanical switch, either through direct contact or in proximity of a reed switch. With mechanically actuated floats, the float is directly connected to a micro switch.

For both magnetic and mechanical float level sensors, chemical compatibility, temperature, specific gravity (density), buoyancy, and viscosity affect the selection of the stem and the float. For example, larger floats may be used with liquids with specific gravities as low as 0.5 while still maintaining buoyancy. The choice of float material is also influenced by temperature-induced changes in specific gravity and viscosity – changes that directly affect buoyancy.

When selecting a magnetic level gauge it is important to take into account the strength of the magnetic field. The magnetic field is the heart of the magnetic level gauge – the stronger the field, the more reliable the instrument will function. Some manufacturers rely on a single magnet for their magnetic level gauges which causes the strength of the north field to be identical to, and as weak as, the south field. It is apparent that at the location of the indicators, switches and transmitters, the field would not be as intense. Some manufacturers use a single annular ring magnet, others use a series of single bar magnets in a circular array in their float design. In this design the relative field strength of the north and south poles will be equal to one another and less than that of a dual magnet design. Moreover, the field strength as you travel around the circumference will have high and low spots as you pass between the individual bar magnets.
