= James F. Rothenberg =

Jim Rothenberg
- Born: July 16, 1946; Pittsburgh, Pennsylvania
- Died: July 21, 2015 (aged 69); Southampton, New York
- Education: Harvard College; Harvard Business School
- Occupations: Investor and philanthropist
- Known for: Chairman of Capital Group Companies, Treasurer of the Harvard Corporation
- Spouse: Anne Rothenberg

James Frederic Rothenberg CFA (July 16, 1946 – July 21, 2015), "a leading figure in the investment world", served as president and director of Capital Research and Management Co. (a principal subsidiary of the Capital Group Companies Inc.) and as investment adviser to American Funds.

Born in Pittsburgh, Rothenberg was an alumnus of both Harvard College and Harvard Business School and at the time of his death was a member of the Harvard Corporation. Until he was replaced by Paul Finnegan in 2014, he had also served as the University's treasurer. He was a trustee of the California Institute of Technology and donated $15 million to Caltech in March, 2015. He was also a member of the Committee on Capital Markets Regulation.

== Death ==
Rothenberg died on July 21, 2015, aged 69, of a heart attack.
