= Semantria =

Semantria, Inc.
- Industry: Software
- Founded: 2011
- Headquarters: Boston, MA
- Key people: Jeff Catlin, CEO of Lexalytics
- Products: Text analytics
- Website: www.lexalytics.com

Semantria is owned by sentiment analysis company Lexalytics, from which it was spun out in 2011. Semantria offers text analysis via API and Excel plugin. It differs from Lexalytics in that it is offered via API and Excel plugin, and in that it incorporates a bigger knowledge base and uses deep learning.

== History ==
Semantria was founded by in February 2011 in an attempt to bring sentiment analysis to a larger audience. Its goal was to make the process accessible for under $1,000 USD in less than three minutes. Semantria continues to support the largest number of languages by any single SaaS sentiment analysis vendor. This ambitious start led to Semantria receiving a five star rating from Tech World Australia a year after it was founded. This early success lead the acquisition of several important accounts in retail, market research, consumer reviews and social media marketing.

Semantria continued successfully despite never accepting venture funding. In November 2013, Semantria announced a partnership with Diffbot: Diffbot would undertake the task of identifying the most important passages of a document and Semantria would then perform text analysis using those passages. According to a January 2014 press release, Semantria grew its revenues by 600% supported by the Oracle Eloqua platform. Later that year, in the summer of 2014, Lexalytics acquired Semantria for around $10 million USD.

== Media coverage ==
In November 2013, GigaOm listed Semantria as one of the top startups using deep learning, along with AlchemyAPI, Cortica, and Ersatz.
