= Lexalytics =

Lexalytics, Inc.
- Type: Private
- Industry: Software
- Founded: 2003
- Headquarters: Boston, MA
- Key people: Jeff Catlin, CEO; Mike Marshall, Former CTO
- Products: Text analytics
- Website: www.lexalytics.com

Lexalytics, Inc. provides sentiment and intent analysis to an array of companies using SaaS and cloud based technology. Salience 6, the engine behind Lexalytics, was built as an on-premises, multi-lingual text analysis engine. It is leased to other companies who use it to power filtering and reputation management programs. In July, 2015 Lexalytics acquired Semantria to be used as a cloud option for its technology. In September, 2021 Lexalytics was acquired by CX company InMoment.

== History ==
Lexalytics spun into existence in January 2003 out of a content management startup called Lightspeed. Lightspeed consolidated on America's West Coast. Jeff Catlin, a Lightspeed General Manager, and Mike Marshall, a Lighstpeed Principal Engineer, convinced investors to give them the East Coast company so as to avoid shutdown costs. Catlin and Marshall renamed the operation Lexalytics.

Catlin took on the role of chief executive officer with Marshall working as Chief Technology Officer. Lexalytics opted to not accept venture cash. Instead, the company initially shared sales and marketing expenses with U.K. based document management company Infonic. The partner companies soon formed a joint venture in July 2008, which was later dissolved. Since then, Lexalytics has worked with many other companies, like Bottlenose, Salesforce, Thomson Reuters, Oracle and DataSift. Relationships with social media monitoring companies like Datasift tend to find Lexalytics’ Salience engine baked into the product itself. Lexalytics is used similarly to monitor sentiment as it relates to stock trading. In December 2014, Lexalytics announced the latest iteration to its sentiment analysis engine, Salience 6. Earlier that year Lexalytics acquired Semantria in a bid to appeal to a wider variety of business models. Created by former Lexalytics Marketing Director Oleg Rogynskyy, Semantria is a SaaS text mining service offered as an API and Excel based plugin that measures sentiment. The goal of the acquisition, which cost Lexalytics less than US$10 million, was to expand the customer base both within the United States and abroad with multilingual support.

The engine that powers Semantria, Salience, is grounded in its deep learning ability. An example of this is its concept matrix, which allows Salience an understanding of concepts and relationship between concepts based on a detailed reading of the entire repository of Wikipedia. This matrix allows Salience to use Wikipedia for automatic categorization. Along with features like the concept matrix, Salience supports 16 international languages. The engine has earned Lexalytics a spot on EContent's “Top 100 Companies in the Digital Content Industry” List for 2014–2015. In September 2018, Lexalytics launched document data extraction market using natural language processing (NLP).

== See also ==
- Semantria
