= Madison Dearborn Partners =

American private equity firm specializing in leveraged buyouts

Madison Dearborn Partners, LLC
- Company type: Privately held company
- Industry: Private equity
- Founded: 1992; 34 years ago
- Headquarters: Chicago, Illinois, United States
- Products: Leveraged buyout
- Total assets: $23 billion
- Number of employees: 50+ (2007)
- Website: https://www.mdcp.com/

Madison Dearborn Partners (MDP) is an American private equity firm which invests in industries, business and government software and services, financial & transaction services, health care sectors. It was established as an independent firm in 1992.

== History ==
Madison Dearborn Partners was founded in 1992 and is based in Chicago, Illinois. The founders, John A Canning Jr., Paul J. Finnegan, Samuel M. Mencoff, and Nicholas W. Alexos, had previously made private equity investments for First Chicago Bank.

=== Investments ===
Between 2006 and 2007, Madison Dearborn completed leveraged buyout transactions for a number of publicly traded companies, including Asurion, CDW, LA Fitness, Nuveen investments, Sorenson Communications, Univision Communications, VWR International and Yankee Candle.

In 2007, the firm joined with Michael Eisner's Tornante investment company to buy out baseball card maker The Topps Company.

In 2010, the firm acquired a majority stake in Transunion from the Pritzker family.

In 2014, a plan for MDP to sell Nuveen to TIAA-CREF for $6.25 billion was announced. While the Wall Street Journal cited an anonymous source close to the transaction to the effect that MDP "will have broken even on the transaction", Felix Salmon queried that assertion at Reuters. Dan Primack at Fortune then published additional information about auxiliary benefits to MDP to buttress the break-even claim.

=== Bell Canada ===
In June 2007, Madison Dearborn, Providence Equity Partners and the Ontario Teachers' Pension Plan agreed to acquire Bell Canada Enterprises (BCE) in what would have been one of the largest leveraged buyouts in history. The transaction was valued at C$51.7billion (US$48.5 billion) and was approved on September 21, 2007, by more than 97% shareholder votes cast by holders of common and preferred shares.

Bondholders argued in the Superior Court of Quebec that the deal did not protect their interests. While the court rejected the bondholder's arguments, the Quebec Court of Appeal sided with those opposed to the deal. In 2008, the Supreme Court of Canada overruled the Court of Appeal, allowing the deal to move forward.

In December 2008, the deal collapsed after auditing firm KPMG determined that the transaction would create an insolvent entity.

== Selected portfolio ==
- Asurion
- InMoment
- Intermedia
- MoneyGram
- Topps
- Univision Communications
