= Louis G. Cowan =

American radio and television producer and executive (1909-1976)

- Born: December 12, 1909; Chicago
- Died: November 18, 1976 (aged 66); New York City (age 66)
- Education: B.A. University of Chicago
- Spouse: Pauline Spiegel
- Children: 4 including Paul Cowan; Geoffrey Cowan

Louis G. Cowan (December 12, 1909 – November 18, 1976) was a president of the CBS broadcasting network in the United States and a creator of quiz shows (including Quiz Kids radio program, Stop the Music, and The $64,000 Question for television), a television producer and was director of the Voice of America from 1943–1945.

== Early life ==
Cowan was born Louis Cohen in 1909 in Chicago but changed his name at age 21. Cowan's parents were Orthodox Jews. His father was Jacob Cohen, a failed businessman, and his mother was Hetty Smitz Cohen. He graduated from the University of Chicago with a Doctor of Philosophy degree in history. While at the university he met his wife Pauline "Polly" Spiegel, granddaughter of Joseph Spiegel, founder of the Spiegel catalog.

== Career ==
Cowan's breakthrough as a producer came in 1940 with Quiz Kids. He set up its first production company Louis G. Cowan Company, who was based in Chicago, in its first stint at game shows after being a commercial agency. During World War II he headed the New York office of the United States Office of War Information. After that he returned to commercial radio, producing first Murder at Midnight and then Fighting Senator. In 1946, he formed his own production company in New York, Louis G. Cowan, Inc. When he moved in to CBS during the success of The $64,000 Question, his eponymous production company, Louis G. Cowan, Inc., was renamed to Entertainment Productions, Inc. under the presidency of Harry Fleischman, and developed successful quiz shows like The $64,000 Question and The Big Surprise. Entertainment Productions went defunct in 1959 shortly after he left CBS.

He produced more than 50 programs during his three years with CBS, including Captain Kangaroo, and won two Peabody Awards. After he left CBS, he founded Chilmark Press, was director of the Brandeis University Communications Center, special lecturer at the Columbia University Graduate School of Journalism and founded the William E. Wiener Oral History Library for the American Jewish Committee.

== Personal life ==
In 1976, Cowan died along with his wife in a house fire in New York City. The fire was believed to have been caused by “smoking carelessness”. They had four children: Paul Cowan, Geoffrey Cowan, Holly Cowan Shulman, and Liza Cowan.

== Legacy ==
Cowan's papers and archives, along with the archives of Chilmark Press, are held at Columbia University.
