= Hannah G. Solomon =

American social reformer

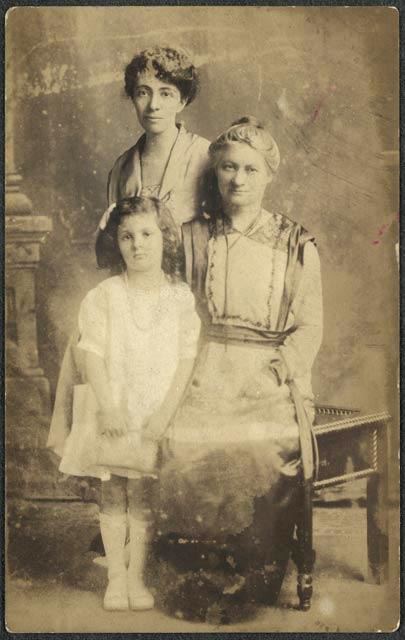
- Solomon with her daughter, Helen S. Levy, and granddaughter, Frances Levy Angel, 1918
- Born: Hannah Greenebaum; January 14, 1858; Chicago, Illinois, U.S.
- Died: December 7, 1942 (aged 84); Chicago, Illinois, U.S.
- Known for: Founder of the National Council of Jewish Women
- Spouse: Henry Solomon (m. 1879; died 1913)
- Children: 3
- Family: Joseph Spiegel (uncle); Marcus M. Spiegel (uncle)

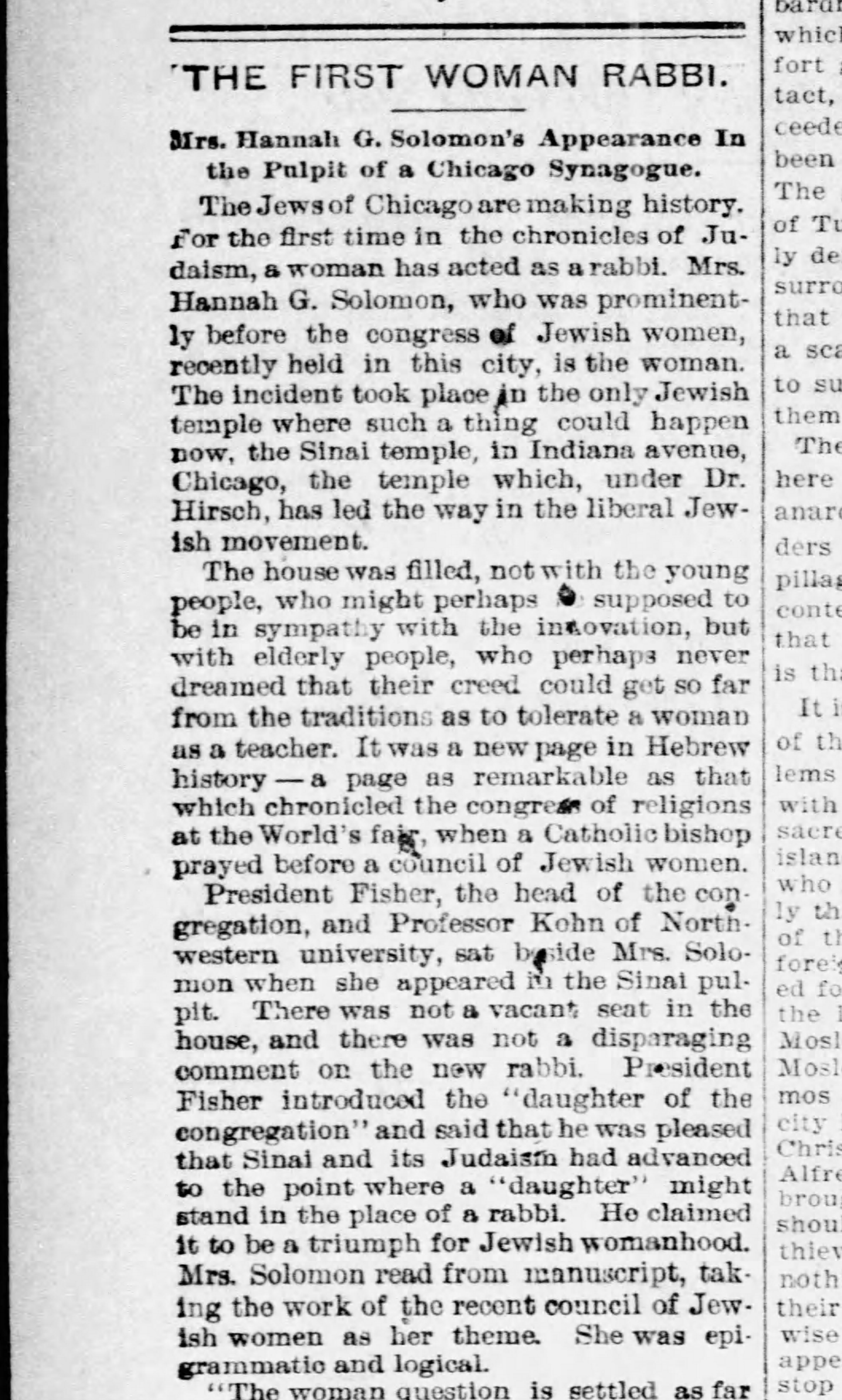
1897 article describing Hannah Solomon as a "first woman rabbi". The Burlington Free Press, 16 Mar 1897.

Hannah Greenebaum Solomon (née Greenebaum; January 14, 1858 – December 7, 1942) was a social reformer and the founder of the National Council of Jewish Women, the first national association of Jewish women. Solomon was an important organizer who reached across boundaries of religious conviction at the local, national, and international levels.

== Biography ==
Solomon was born in Chicago on January 14, 1858, the fourth of ten siblings, to Sarah (née Spiegel) and Michael Greenebaum. Her father was part of the earliest group of Jews to settle in the frontier city of Chicago. Her uncle was Joseph Spiegel, the founder of the Spiegel catalog. Solomon’s parents set an example of strong civic involvement; her mother organized Chicago's first Jewish Ladies Sewing Society, where they made clothes for the needy, and her father founded the Zion Literary Society, was a volunteer fireman, and also helped found Chicago's first Reform synagogue, Kehilath Anshe Maarav.

In 1876, Hannah and her older sister Henriette were the first Jewish women ever to be elected to the elite Chicago Women's Club. Many of Solomon's ideas for the National Council of Jewish Women stemmed from her experiences with the Chicago Woman's Club, which emphasized philanthropy and education.

Solomon became involved in an attempt to build a national association for Jewish women out of an evident lack of associations for Jewish women and a desire to propagate change. After years of planning and organizing, the Jewish Women’s Congress met in 1893, culminating in a vote to form the National Council of Jewish Women. At that same meeting, Solomon was elected president in a unanimous show of approval. By the council's first Triennial convention in 1896, NCJW was an organization of fifty sections and over 3,300 members. Solomon resigned as president in 1905, citing health reasons and the need to rest.

Solomon was indefatigable in her active civic involvement. Her many positions included serving as President of the Illinois Industrial School for Girls. Solomon also worked to institute Chicago's first Juvenile Court and to improve the city's laws concerning children.

Throughout her time as an organizer, Solomon relied on her family to support her and her efforts. Her husband, Henry Solomon, often accompanied her on business trips, and the whole family travelled to Berlin for the International Council of Women Convention in 1904.

She died at her home in Chicago on December 7, 1942.

In her later years, as well as after her death, Solomon was celebrated again and again for her trailblazing work. The National Council of Jewish Women still evokes her words as an inspiration to "improve the quality of life for women, children and families and... ensure individual rights and freedoms for all".

== Legacy ==
An elementary school named in her honor was opened on Chicago's North Side in 1955.

In 1995, Solomon was inducted into the National Women's Hall of Fame.

== See also ==
- Ray Frank
- Lena Aronsohn
