= Geoffrey Cowan =

American lawyer, professor, and non-profit executive (born 1942)

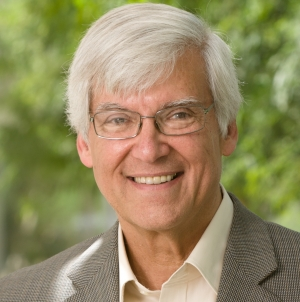
- Born: May 8, 1942 (age 84); Chicago, Illinois, U.S.
- Education: Harvard University (BA); Yale University (LLB)
- Spouse: Aileen Adams
- Children: 2, including Gabriel
- Relatives: Polly Spiegel Cowan (mother); Louis G. Cowan (father); Paul Cowan (brother); Joseph Spiegel (great-grandfather)
- Website: Official website

Geoffrey Cowan (born May 8, 1942) is an American lawyer, professor, author, and non-profit executive. He is a university professor at the University of Southern California, where he holds the Annenberg Family Chair in Communication Leadership and directs the Annenberg School's Center on Communication Leadership & Policy. In 2010, Cowan was named president of The Annenberg Foundation Trust at Sunnylands, a position he held until July 2016. In this role, Cowan was commissioned with the task of turning the 200-acre estate of Ambassador Walter Annenberg and his wife Leonore into "a venue for important retreats for top government officials and leaders in the fields of law, education, philanthropy, the arts, culture, science and medicine." Since Sunnylands reopened in 2012, Cowan has helped to arrange a series of meetings and retreats there. In 2013–14, U.S. President Barack Obama convened bilateral meetings at Sunnylands with CCP General Secretary Xi Jinping and with King Abdullah II of Jordan. In 2016, President Obama hosted the Association of Southeast Asian Nations (ASEAN) at the site, where they released the Sunnylands Declaration. Prior to his time at Sunnylands, Cowan was appointed by President Bill Clinton as Director of Voice of America.

== Background and education ==
Geoffrey Cowan was born to a Jewish family on May 8, 1942, in Chicago, Illinois. He is the son of Louis G. Cowan, former president of the CBS television network and professor at the Columbia School of Journalism. His mother, Polly Spiegel Cowan, granddaughter of Joseph Spiegel, was a TV and radio producer, and a civil rights activist who started Wednesdays in Mississippi together with Dorothy Height.

Cowan is a graduate of both the Dalton School (class of 1956) and the Choate School (class of 1960). He went on to graduate from Harvard College (class of 1964), where he studied American History and Literature, and was an editor of The Harvard Crimson. He is a 1968 graduate of Yale Law School.

== Early career (1960–70) ==
=== Civil rights ===
In the summer of 1964, Cowan went to rural Mississippi to register black voters and start a farmers co-op during Freedom Summer. His letters home were included in the book Letters from Mississippi and published by Esquire in Smiling Through the Apocalypse: Esquire's History of the Sixties.

The following summer, Cowan returned south to Alabama to co-found the Southern Courier, the first civil rights newspaper in the region. The Southern Courier began publication in July, 1965, and "every week for three years - 177 issues - it reported the stories of the movement that changed America."

=== Commission on the Democratic Selection of Democratic Nominees ===
While working for Senator Eugene McCarthy's presidential campaign during his last year at Yale Law School in 1968, Cowan founded "The Commission on the Democratic Selection of Democratic Nominees" to increase public participation in the presidential selection process. Chaired by Governor and later Senator Harold Hughes of Iowa, the Commission studied the ways in which delegates were chosen and issued a report of the committee's findings that was delivered at the 1968 Democratic National Convention. The report concluded that nearly half of the delegates needed to nominate a presidential candidate were chosen by party bosses. This led to dramatic reform in the selection of delegates for presidential primaries. Cowan later said of his work on the commission, "The campaigns of 1968 were part of a broader movement to change institutions in a substantial way, whether it be an incumbent President or a corporate hierarchy for the American Medical Association." On the eve of the 1972 Democratic Convention, Howard K. Smith delivered a commentary as co-anchor of the ABC Evening News that ended with these words: "Over the hall tonight hang huge pictures of men who made the Democratic Party what it is. One is missing - young Geoffrey Cowan. He did more to change conventions than anybody since Andrew Jackson first started them."

=== Center for Law and Social Policy ===
In 1969, after graduating from law school, Cowan moved to Washington, D.C., where he co-founded the first public interest law firm in the United States, the Center for Law and Social Policy. This legal foundation "became an important force in representing civil rights groups, women's organizations and labor unions," as well as consumer and environmental organizations.

=== My Lai Massacre ===
In 1974, Seymour Hersh revealed that Cowan was his source for a story on the My Lai Massacre that won Hersh the 1970 Pulitzer Prize for International Reporting.

== Academic career at UCLA (1972–1995) ==
In 1972, Cowan moved to Los Angeles to become the first director of UCLA's Communications Law program. Under Cowan's leadership, the program regularly produced research and conducted advocacy campaigns that caught the attention of local and national media. During the first year of the program, UCLA students took on more than forty cases related to media ownership and broadcasting rules, and pressed for more jobs for women and minorities in television programming.

In 1975, he helped Norman Lear and the Writers Guild of America organize the legal challenge to CBS' Family Viewing Hour, which had forced Lear's program All in the Family to move from 8pm to 9pm because its content didn't conform to the newly set Family Viewing Time.

Cowan spent more than twenty years teaching law to undergraduates in the UCLA Communication Studies program, received numerous teaching awards and founded the Center for Communication Policy. In 1994, the Center worked with Vice President Al Gore to host The Superhighway Summit, which was the "first public conference bringing together all of the major industry, government and academic leaders in the field [and] also began the national dialogue about the Internet and its implications."

== Government service (1979–84; 1994–96) ==
From 1979 to 1984, Cowan was a member of the Board of Directors of the Corporation for Public Broadcasting, where he played a key role in the development of National Public Radio and the launch of its "Morning Edition" program.

In 1989, Los Angeles Mayor Tom Bradley appointed Cowan to chair an independent commission to create an ethics code for the city. The Cowan commission's proposals were adopted through a public referendum, and the Los Angeles Times referred to the code as "not simply a new code of governmental conduct, but the most comprehensive civic reform package proposed since the Progressive Era. It already is being cited as a model for the nation--and rightly so." Cowan set out to "define a new era of propriety in state and local government," and for his work chairing the commission he was named "Man of the Year" in 1989 by the Council of Government Ethics Leaders.

In 1994, President Bill Clinton appointed Cowan to serve the nation as the 22nd director of the Voice of America, the international broadcasting service of the United States Information Agency, which at the time had more than 100 million listeners each week and was broadcast in more than 47 languages. His father, Louis Cowan, had been the 2nd director of VOA from 1943 to 1945. During his two and a half years as director, and in spite of budget austerity, VOA increased the number of language services from 47 to 53, started the first regularly scheduled international daily call-in talk show, Talk to America, and began transmitting TV and radio shows through direct-broadcast satellite. Cowan's vision for VOA was that it should move from monologue to dialogue with the world, and that "it should provide the people of the world with the information that they need in the languages they speak, and delivered over transmission services that they can receive." He also understood the relevance of VOA to US foreign policy, especially in counteracting the misrepresentation of American culture and aims in the Middle East. The VOA under Cowan created a radio documentary series that explored the growth of Islam in the US and the integration of Muslims into everyday life in the country, as well as other innovative programs such as Perspectives (a weekly interview and discussion show in English that examined global issues of religion and ethics) and This I Believe (which showcased the personal values of one prominent American each week).

In addition to his roles at VOA in 1994–96, Cowan also served as associate director of the United States Information Agency and as director of the International Broadcasting Bureau, which in addition to VOA was responsible for WORLDNET and Radio y Televisión Martí.

== USC Annenberg School for Communication and Journalism (since 1996) ==
From 1996 to 2007, Cowan served as dean of the University of Southern California's Annenberg School for Communication & Journalism. At USC Annenberg, he launched academic programs in public diplomacy, specialized journalism, strategic public relations, global communication and online communities. Under his leadership, USC Annenberg's endowment rose from $6.5 million to $183.5 million. During that time, the number of full-time faculty nearly doubled and the Annenberg building was expanded and redecorated to promote and unify the school behind its brand. Cowan launched and remains involved with major USC Annenberg centers and projects, including the USC Center on Public Diplomacy, the Norman Lear Center, the Charles Annenberg Weingarten Program on Online Communities, the Knight Digital Media Center and the USC Annenberg School Center for the Digital Future.

When he stepped down as dean in 2007, he was named a university professor, the inaugural holder of the Annenberg Family Chair in Communication Leadership and founding director of the USC Annenberg Center on Communication Leadership & Policy, which he continues to direct. He holds a joint appointment in the USC Gould School of Law and teaches courses in communication, journalism and entrepreneurship.

== Annenberg Retreat at Sunnylands (2010–2016) ==
In 2010, Cowan was named the first President of The Annenberg Foundation Trust at Sunnylands with a mandate to turn the 200-acre estate of Ambassador Walter Annenberg and his wife Leonore into "a venue for important retreats for top government officials and leaders in the fields of law, education, philanthropy, the arts, culture, science and medicine." Under his leadership, the Trustees and staff worked together to create a historic residence that provides a place of tranquility and hospitality where national and international leaders from a range of fields may convene to "promote world peace and facilitate international agreement."

Since its official opening in 2012, Sunnylands has hosted several retreats on topics such as the rising sea levels and ocean acidification; the future of AIDS research; revolutionizing K-12 mathematics teaching and learning; mobile phones and public safety; and the US-Mexico relationship. Sunnylands has welcomed President Barack Obama on five occasions, including for two summits with other leaders: one with CCP general secretary Xi Jinping in June, 2013, and the other with King Abdullah II of Jordan in February, 2014.

== Producer & television host ==
While teaching at UCLA, Cowan was a television producer. In 1992, he won an Emmy as executive producer of the television movie Mark Twain & Me, which was voted Outstanding Prime Time Program for Children by the Academy of Television Arts and Sciences.

He also produced a new edition of The Quiz Kids, a popular radio and TV series from the 1940s and 1950s that was originally created by his father. In 1981, he hosted a public affairs show created by Walter Cronkite called Why in the World?

== Author ==
=== Books ===
Cowan's books include: See No Evil: The Backstage Battle Over Sex and Violence on Television (Simon & Schuster, 1980), the best-selling The People v. Clarence Darrow: The Bribery Trial of America's Greatest Lawyer (Random House, 1993) and Let the People Rule: Theodore Roosevelt and the Birth of the Presidential Primary (W.W. Norton & Company, 2016). See No Evil explores the history, impact and politics of television censorship, examining network programming and controversial practices like the Family Viewing Hour. The People v. Clarence Darrow tells the story of Darrow's 1912 bribery trial and provides a vivid study of the legal system in Los Angeles at the turn of the century. In a front-page review in the Washington Post, Alan Dershowitz called the book "eye-popping and icon-shattering." In 2009, the Wall Street Journal called it the best book ever written about a trial lawyer. Let the People Rule details the exhilarating story of the four-month campaign that changed American politics forever. Of the book, Karl Rove said, "Cowan has written a lively account of Theodore Roosevelt's effort to have the Republican Party oust his one-time friend, President William Howard Taft, and install himself as its nominee for the White House in 1912...Well researched and written with the gusto of someone who knows and loves politics, it's a great read."

=== Playwright ===
With the late Leroy Aarons, Cowan co-wrote the award-winning play Top Secret: The Battle for the Pentagon Papers, which explores the delicate balance between the press, the public's right to know and the government's need to protect some vital national secrets. Top Secret was originally produced in 1991 by L.A. Theater Works as a radio play in front of a live audience for national broadcast on NPR. Writing in Vogue, Graydon Carter called the play "quite magnificent," and it won the CPB's Gold Award for Excellence. Also called and "engaging," "splendidly nuanced" and "crackling drama" by reviewers, Top Secret was presented Off-Broadway by the New York Theatre Workshop in 2010, and was performed in 25 venues across the country during a national tour in 2007–2008. After a successful tour of China in 2011, Top Secret was invited to return to China in 2013 for a second tour. Produced by L.A. Theatre Works and sponsored by a grant from the U.S. Department of State, Top Secret toured a number of top-tier venues in China including the National Center for the Performing Arts ("The Egg"), the Tianjin Grand Theater, and major venues in Hangzhou, Suzhou, Chongqing and Fuling. The tour received significant coverage in major outlets including The New York Times, The Atlantic, and China's CCTV news channel.

== Personal life ==
Cowan is married to Aileen Adams, former deputy mayor of Los Angeles and former California Secretary of State and Consumer Affairs. They have two children, Gabriel Cowan, a filmmaker and founder of the New Artists Alliance, and Mandy Wolf, a grade school teacher who works at The Center for Early Education.

His late brother, Paul Cowan, was a journalist and staff writer for The Village Voice for more than 20 years, and author of An Orphan in History. His sister, Holly Cowan Shulman, is the editor of the Dolley Madison Digital Edition and a professor at the University of Virginia, and his sister Liza Cowan is an artist, graphic designer, curator and blogger.

== Professional associations and memberships ==
Cowan serves on the board of the Harvard Kennedy School's Shorenstein Center on Media, Politics, and Public Policy, the Berggruen Institute, Common Sense Media, Democracy 21, and the Susan Thompson Buffett Foundation. He is a member of the Council on Foreign Relations and the Pacific Council on International Policy.

He chaired the California Bipartisan Commission on Internet Political Practices and served as a member and chair of the White House Fellows regional selection committee during the Clinton and Bush administrations. In 1991, Cowan was elected to the Common Cause National Governing Board.

In 2008, he was named the Walter Lippmann Fellow of the American Academy of Political and Social Science and in 2009 he was elected as a member of the American Academy of Arts and Science.

== Bibliography ==
- See No Evil: The Backstage Battle Over Sex and Violence on Television (Simon & Schuster, 1980) ISBN 0-671-23091-3, ISBN 978-0-671-23091-3
- The People v. Clarence Darrow: The Bribery Trial of America's Greatest Lawyer (Random House, 1993) ISBN 0-8129-6361-X, ISBN 978-0-8129-6361-8
- Let the People Rule: Theodore Roosevelt and the Birth of the Presidential Primary (W.W. Norton & Company, 2016) ISBN 978-0393353693
