= Polly Spiegel Cowan =

American civil rights activist (1913–1976)

Pauline Spiegel Cowan
- Born: Pauline Spiegel; 1913
- Died: 1976 (aged 62–63)
- Known for: Co-founding Wednesdays in Mississippi
- Spouse: Louis G. Cowan
- Children: Paul Cowan; Geoffrey Cowan
- Parent(s): Lena Straus Spiegel; Modie Spiegel
- Family: John Patrick Spiegel (brother); Joseph Spiegel (grandfather)

Pauline "Polly" Spiegel Cowan (1913–1976) was an American civil rights activist who co-founded Wednesdays in Mississippi.

== Biography ==
She was born Penelope Spiegel to a German Jewish immigrant family, the youngest of four children born to Lena (née Straus) and Modie Spiegel. Her mother was the daughter of banker Frederic W. Straus. Her grandfather was Joseph Spiegel and her great-uncle was Civil War Colonel Marcus M. Spiegel. She and her three brothers, Frederick W. Spiegel (1898–1975), Modie "M.J." Spiegel Jr. (1901–1990), and John P. Spiegel (1911–1991), were raised in Kenilworth, Illinois. Although her family was of Jewish descent, they were raised in the Christian Science faith. She graduated from Sarah Lawrence College where she had studied under Max Lerner and Robert Staughton Lynd. She wrote an essay arguing for democratic socialism for her alumna magazine entitled "Pleading for Pink". In 1939, she moved to New York City with her husband where they worked together as radio and television producers. In 1952, her husband ran the media campaign for Adlai Stevenson and she was responsible for "Women Volunteers for Stevenson". After her husband took a job at CBS, she took up social activism, first at the Citizens Committee for Children and then the National Council of Negro Women. In 1964, she co-founded Wednesdays in Mississippi with Dorothy Height. She was an honorary member of Delta Sigma Theta sorority.

== Personal life ==
She married twice. Her first marriage was to a man who worked for her grandfather. On August 7, 1939, she married Louis G. Cowan. In 1976, Cowan died along with her husband in a house fire in New York City. They had four children: Paul Cowan, Geoffrey Cowan, Holly Cowan Shulman, and Liza Cowan.
