= Edwin Silverman =

American businessman

- Born: 1898; Chicago, Illinois
- Died: February 12, 1970 (age 72)
- Known for: Co-founder of Essaness Theatres
- Spouse: Velma Silverman
- Family: Susan Silverman; Jack Silverman; Alan Silverman

Edwin Silverman (1898 – February 12, 1970) was an American businessman who co-founded the Essaness Theatres chain and founded WSNS-TV.

== Biography ==
Silverman was born to a Jewish family in Chicago. He worked as a poster clerk at the First National Pictures Corp. where he eventually became general sales manager of Warner Bros. after it took control of First National Pictures.

In 1929, he co-founded the Essaness Theatres Corporation in Chicago with Sidney M. Spiegel Jr., grandson of Joseph Spiegel, founder of the Spiegel catalog. The name is a play on the founder's last names Silverman & Spiegel with S&S becoming ESS-AN-ESS. The company eventually owned 33 theaters in the Chicago area. He was also the founder of WSNS-TV channel 44 in Chicago (SNS mirrors the pronunciation of "Essaness"). He retired to Palm Springs where he was a supporter of the Desert Hospital.

By 1984, the chain operated 86 movie screens in Illinois, Indiana and Wisconsin.

== Personal life ==
He had one daughter, Susan, and two sons, Jack and Alan, both executives of Essaness. He was buried at the Rosehill Cemetery in Chicago.
