= Joseph Spiegel =

American businessman (1840–1918)

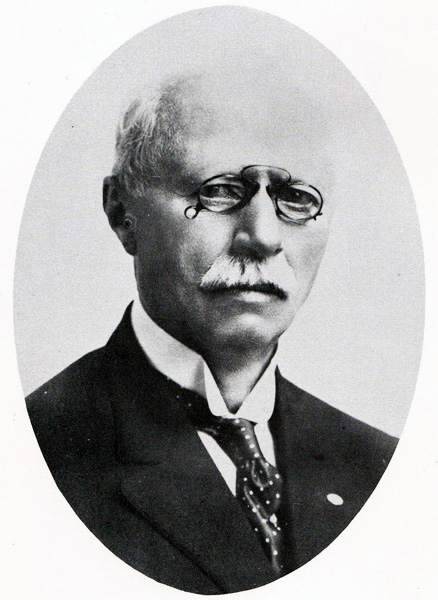
- Born: 1840; Abenheim, Germany
- Died: September 13, 1918 (aged 77–78); Chicago, Illinois, U.S.
- Burial place: Rosehill Cemetery
- Known for: Spiegel catalog
- Spouse: Matilda Liebenstein
- Children: Sidney Spiegel; Modie Spiegel; Arthur Spiegel
- Relatives: Marcus M. Spiegel (brother); Hannah G. Solomon (niece); Fay Lanphier (daughter-in-law); Polly Spiegel Cowan (granddaughter); John Patrick Spiegel (grandson); Paul Cowan (great-grandson); Geoffrey Cowan (great-grandson); Spike Jonze (great-great-grandson); Sam Spiegel (great-great-grandson); John Michels (great-great-grandson); Gabriel Cowan (great-great-grandson); Alix Spiegel (great-great-granddaughter)

Joseph Spiegel (1840 – September 13, 1918) was the founder of the Spiegel catalog, a Civil War veteran, the younger brother of Union Army Colonel Marcus M. Spiegel, and patriarch of the Spiegel family.

== Biography ==
Spiegel was born to a Jewish family, the son of Regina (née Greenebaum) and Moses Spiegel, a rabbi. In September of 1848, his family (himself, three sisters, and his parents) emigrated from their small village in Abenheim, near the city of Worms in the Grand Duchy of Hesse, to the United States via France, fleeing growing anti-Jewish sentiment, revolutionary turmoil, and the fear that the government would punish them for the revolutionary activities of their firstborn son Marcus Spiegel, who had participated in an unsuccessful uprising against government troops in the state of Baden with Franz Sigel's liberal-democratic Landsturm regiment. They settled in the Jewish community on the Lower East Side of Manhattan where his father Moses sold needles, thread, and cloth. His mother died in 1849 and his father reverted to being a rabbi and teacher. His brother – who the family thought was dead – immigrated to the United States in 1849 but soon moved to Chicago, as did two of his sisters: Sarah Spiegel married Michael Greenebaum, the owner of a chain of hardware stores in Chicago; and Theresa Spiegel married Henry Liebenstein, a successful Chicago furniture merchant, in 1865.

Joseph Spiegel worked as an apprentice in several retail stores in New York until 1862, and in 1863 he enlisted in the 120th Ohio Volunteers. He served in General Ulysses S. Grant's army in Louisiana where he acted as sutler to his brother's regiment, witnessed his brother's death in battle, and was later captured and sent to the prisoner of war camp at Camp Ford, Texas, where he remained until May 1865. He returned to Chicago where he entered the furniture business with his brother-in-law, opening a small furniture shop on Wabash Avenue named J. Spiegel and Company which sold Liebenstein furniture. In 1870, he assumed control of the Liebenstein business after marrying Liebenstein's niece, Mathilde Liebenstein. The Chicago Fire of 1871 destroyed his business, although he was able to quickly restart since most of his inventory had been stored at his undamaged house, which led to a boom as fire victims needed to repurchase furniture. In 1886, his sons, Modie and Sidney, joined the business. In the 1890s, as wealthy clientele moved to the suburbs and were replaced by immigrants, Spiegel shifted the company's strategy from selling high-quality furniture on a cash-only basis to cheaper furniture on credit. In 1903, his son Arthur joined the business and Spiegel started their mail order catalog business, becoming the first company to sell furniture by mail. By 1925, the fashion and furniture retailer had 10 million customers.

== Personal life ==
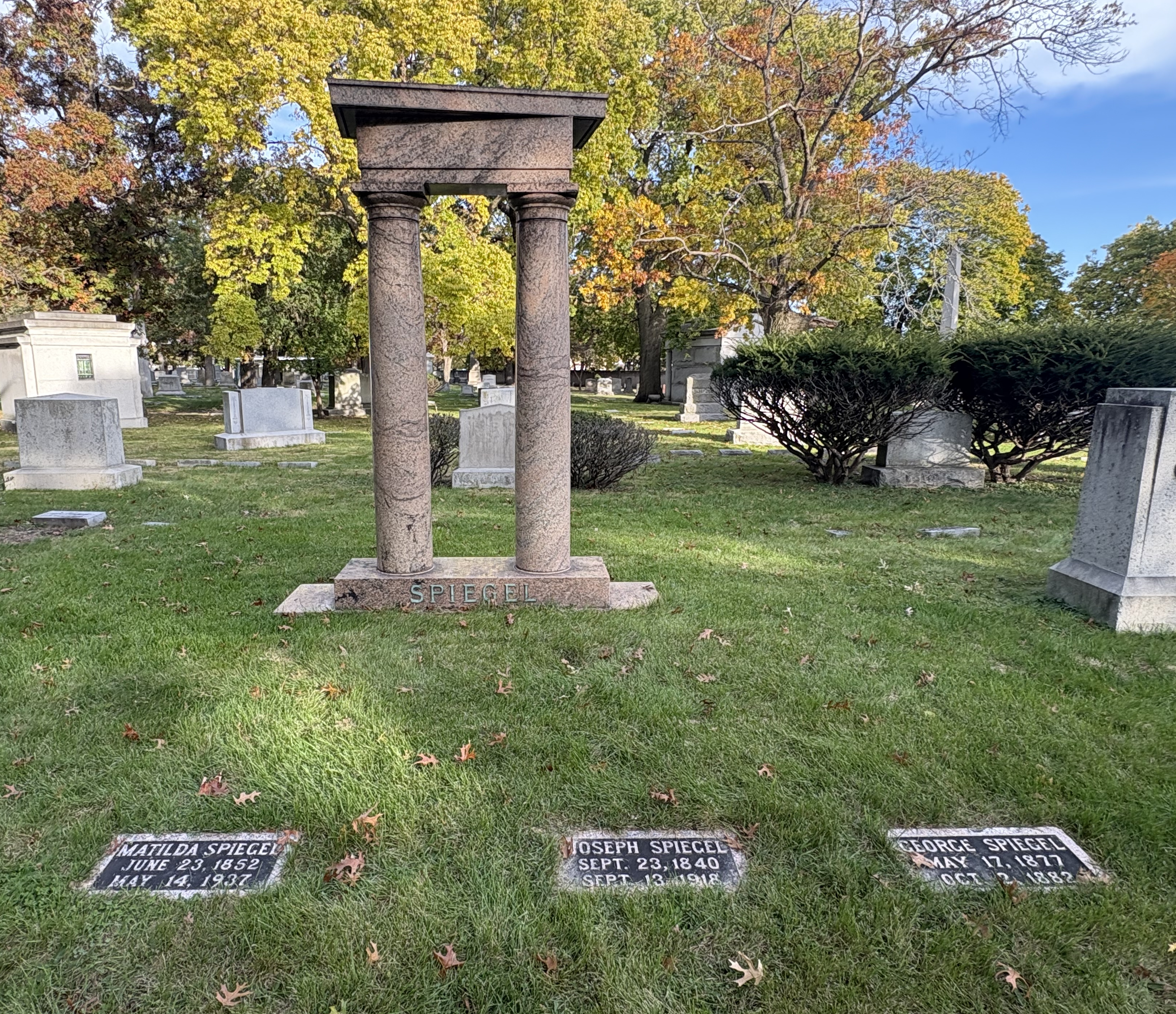
Spiegel's grave (center) at Rosehill Cemetery

Spiegel married Mathilde Liebenstein, the niece of his business partner, Henry Liebenstein. They had three sons, Modie Spiegel (b. 1871), Sidney Spiegel (b. 1872), and Arthur Spiegel (b. 1884), and three daughters. His son Sidney married the model Fay Lanphier. His grandson, Sidney M. Spiegel Jr. co-founded the Essaness Theatres chain with Edwin Silverman in 1929. One great-grandson, Paul Cowan, was a journalist, and another great-grandson, Geoffrey Cowan, is an academic and writer.

Joseph Spiegel died at Michael Reese Hospital in Chicago on September 13, 1918, and was buried at Rosehill Cemetery.
