= Paul Cowan (writer) =

American journalist (1940–1988)

- Born: September 21, 1940
- Died: September 26, 1988 (aged 48)
- Education: B.A. Harvard University
- Occupation: journalist
- Notable work: An Orphan in History: Retrieving a Jewish Legacy (1982); Mixed Blessings: Marriage between Jews and Christians (1987)
- Spouse: Rachel Cowan
- Parent(s): Polly Spiegel Cowan; Louis G. Cowan
- Family: Geoffrey Cowan (brother); Gabriel Cowan (nephew); Joseph Spiegel (great-grandfather)

Paul Cowan (1940–1988) was a New York-based journalist, staff writer for The Village Voice, and the author of several books, including a memoir of his reconnection to his Jewish roots and a guide to interfaith marriages.

== Early life ==
Born on September 21, 1940, Paul Cowan was the child of Louis G. Cowan, a television producer who later became president of CBS, and Pauline “Polly” Spiegel Cowan, an heir to the Spiegel Catalog company, granddaughter of Joseph Spiegel. While both of his parents were Jewish, Cowan was not raised with any observance of Jewish traditions, a fact that was to become important in his later writing and community involvement. He attended Choate preparatory school and graduated from Harvard University.

== Career ==
After college, Cowan spent two years in the Peace Corps and in 1970 wrote a book about his experiences in Ecuador, The Making of an Un-American. He joined the Village Voice as a staff writer and wrote about the civil rights movement, coal miners in Kentucky, poverty-stricken older Jews in New York City, the Mexican border city of Ciudad Juárez, and Vietnam War protests. After his parents died in a fire in 1978, Cowan began to investigate his Jewish roots and discovered that his grandparents on his father's side were Orthodox Jews from Lithuania, his family's real name had been Cohen, and his great-great-grandfather had been a rabbi. He embraced his Jewish roots and wrote a book about his journey of discovery, An Orphan in History: Retrieving a Jewish Legacy in 1982. He and his wife, along with others, worked to start a Jewish school and revitalize an historic synagogue in Manhattan. In 1987 he published Mixed Blessings: Marriage between Jews and Christians, a book about the challenges of interfaith families.

== Personal life ==
Cowan married Rachel Ann Brown, a social worker, in 1965. She converted to Judaism in 1980, and later became a Reform rabbi. Together they had two children, Lisa and Matt. Cowan had three siblings: Geoffrey Cowan, an attorney and university professor, Holly Shulman, and Liza Cowan.

== Death ==
Cowan died of leukemia on September 26, 1988.

== Publications ==
- The Making of an Un-American: A Dialogue with Experience (1970)
- State Secrets: Police Surveillance in America (1974)
- The Tribes of America (1979)
- An Orphan in History: Retrieving a Jewish Legacy (1982)
- Mixed Blessings: Marriage between Jews and Christians (1987)
