= Scattergood Baines (radio series) =

American radio series

Scattergood Baines is an American serial radio program that was broadcast in two versions, one on CBS from 1937 until 1942 and the other on Mutual in 1949. Both versions were based on stories written by Clarence Budington Kelland and published in magazines.

== Characters ==
The title character operated a hardware store in Cold River, a small town, and used persuasion to encourage people to do what was in their best interests. Mirandy Baines was his wife. Hippocrates Brown, his helper in the store, did as little work as possible. Pliny Pickett was a railroad conductor. Ed Potts was a mechanic who was active in town affairs, and Clara Potts was his nagging, but beautiful, wife. Jimmy Baines was the son whom Scattergood adopted as an infant, and Dodie Black was Jimmy's birth mother. Harvey Fox at one point schemed with Black to help her try to gain custody of her son. J. Wellington Keats managed the hotel, and Ernie Baker was the barber.

== CBS version ==
Scattergood Baines debuted on CBS West Coast stations on February 11, 1937. It originated in Hollywood until October 2, 1938, when it moved to Chicago and distribution expanded to the nationwide CBS network. It ended on June 12, 1942. The 15-minute program was sponsored by Wrigley's gum. Walter Preston was the producer and director. Finding the right actor for the title role proved difficult for the CBS Artists Bureau because of the "peculiar character necessary to lead player's voice".

Actors and the characters they played are shown in the table below.

Characters in CBS Version of Scattergood Baines and Actors Who Portrayed Them
Character	Actor
Scattergood Baines	Jess Pugh
Mirandy Baines	Viola Berwick
Hippocrates Brown	John Hearne
Pliny Pickett	Francis "Dink" Trout
Clara Potts	Catherine McCune
Ed Potts	Arnold Robertson
Jimmy Baines	Charles Grant
Dodie Black	Eileen Palmer
Harvey Fox	Boris Aplon
J. Wellington Keats	Forrest Lewis
Ernie Baker	Forrest Lewis
Eloise Comstock	Dorothy Gregory; Louise Fitch
Beth Reed	Norma Jean Ross

Roger Krupp and George Walsh were the announcers. The program was replaced by a musical program featuring Ben Bernie.

== Mutual version ==
Mutual debuted a 30-minute version of Scattergood Baines on February 10, 1949, and it ran until October 26, 1949. It was first broadcast on Thursdays, then moved to Saturdays in July, and finally was heard on Wednesdays. Ben Ludlow directed the orchestra. Herbert Rice was the producer, and Gerald Holland was the writer. Jerry Layton and Wilbur Stark were producers and directors.

Characters in Mutual Version of Scattergood Baines and Actors Who Portrayed Them
Character	Actor
Scattergood Baines	Wendell Holmes
Mandy Baines	Leora Thatcher
Hannibal Gibbey	Parker Fennelly
Matilda Gibbey	Eleanor Phelps
Chief Jake Workley	Don Douglas
Fern	Bryna Raeburn

Bob Emerick was the announcer.

== Television pilot ==
Will Rogers Jr. starred in a pilot of a Scattergood Baines TV series. Made by John W. Loveton Productions, the pilot was completed in September 1954. Others in the cast were Griff Barnett, Jeanette Dolan, William Fawcett, and Margaret Field. Lew Landers was the director.
