= Arthur Spiegel =

American businessman and film studio executive (1885–1916)

- Born: Arthur Henry Spiegel; January 12, 1885; Chicago, Illinois, United States
- Died: April 7, 1916 (aged 31); Manhattan, New York, United States
- Known for: Spiegel catalog
- Spouse: Mae Julia Oberfelder
- Children: 1
- Parent: Joseph Spiegel
- Relatives: Spike Jonze (great-grandson); Sam Spiegel (great-grandson)

Arthur Henry Spiegel I (January 12, 1885 – April 7, 1916) was an American mail-order businessman and early film studio executive.

== Biography ==
Spiegel was the youngest son of Jewish businessman Joseph Spiegel, founder of the Spiegel Home Furnishings merchandising house based in Chicago and the Spiegel catalog.

Arthur Spiegel had little interest in the furnishing business and asked his father to allow him to begin selling by mail order. His father agreed, and in a short time the mail order business outstripped the home furnishings business, which the family then closed to concentrate on mail order. Shortly after, in 1914, Spiegel left the mail order business and started in the film business as the partner of Jack L. Warner and Lewis J. Selznick.

Spiegel provided the investment backing to Selznick to start Equitable. In 1914, Spiegel again invested in Selznick to form the World Film Company headquartered in Fort Lee, New Jersey, the first American movie capital.

Under Selznick, World Film did not thrive and it was merged with Equitable, at which time Selznick was forced from the company, and Spiegel was made president and general manager of the new World Pictures. In a letter to Warner, shortly before his death, Spiegel apologized for not being able to attend an agreed meeting for World Pictures, explaining, "I have not been able to shake this cold." He died shortly afterwards, at 31, from pneumonia. He was buried at Rosehill Cemetery in Chicago.

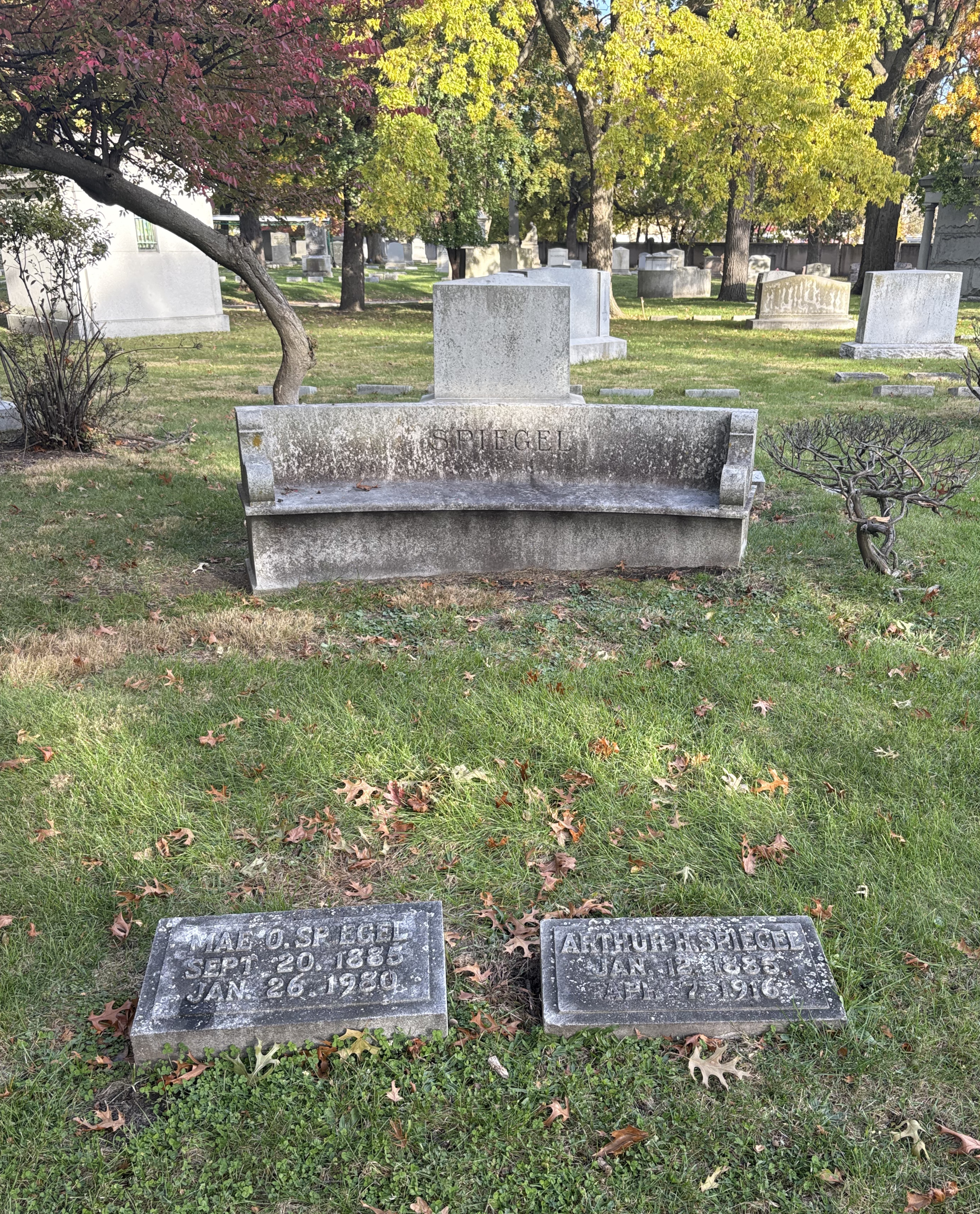
Spiegel's grave at Rosehill Cemetery

World Film had been created to import foreign-made features and to distribute the movies of several newly established feature-film companies, but later moved beyond distribution to produce films. In the early days of American film, World Pictures was one of the key studios.

Spiegel has a star on the Hollywood Walk of Fame.

== Personal life ==
Spiegel was married to Mae Oberfelder; they had one son, Arthur Henry Spiegel II (1908–2000). One of his great-grandchildren, Adam, is a filmmaker and actor using the name Spike Jonze, and another is the DJ Sam Spiegel.
