= John Patrick Spiegel =

American physician

- Born: March 17, 1911
- Died: July 17, 1991 (aged 80)
- Parent(s): Lena Straus Spiegel; Modie Spiegel
- Family: Polly Spiegel Cowan (sister); Joseph Spiegel (grandfather); Alix Spiegel (granddaughter)

John Patrick Spiegel (March 17, 1911 – July 17, 1991) was an American psychiatrist, and expert on violence and combat stress and the 103rd President of the American Psychiatric Association (APA). As president-elect of the APA in 1973, and a closeted homosexual at the time, he helped to change the definition of homosexuality in the Diagnostic and Statistical Manual of Mental Disorders (DSM) which had previously described homosexuality as sexual deviance and that homosexuals were pathological.

== Biography ==
Spiegel was born in Chicago, Illinois, attended Dartmouth College and graduated in 1934. He received his medical degree in 1938 from Northwestern University School of Medicine. He later taught at the University of Chicago and Harvard University, and practiced medicine at Michael Reese Hospital.

During World War II, he served as a medical officer in the Army Air Corps. He joined the faculty of Brandeis University, where he headed the Lemberg Center for the Study of Violence from 1966 to 1973.

=== Personal life ===
Spiegel was married to Babette Shiller (d.1975); they had four children: Adam Spiegel, Heli Spiegel Meltsner, Mamie Spiegel, and Polly Spiegel. Spiegel's granddaughter is National Public Radio correspondent Alix Spiegel. After the death of his wife, he came out as gay. He died on July 17, 1991, in Cambridge, Massachusetts.

== Publications ==
- 1945. War Neuroses. with Roy R. Grinker Sr., Philadelphia, 1945.
