= Fighting Senator =

American radio drama series (1946)

Fighting Senator is an American radio drama series that was broadcast on CBS beginning on July 29, 1946, as the summer replacement for The Joan Davis Show.

== Overview ==
Time magazine called Fighting Senator "a sort of Lone Ranger with social significance". Jeff Tyler was the title character, a 31-year-old World War II veteran from Oak Falls, who had received the Congressional Medal of Honor. Encouraged by his friends from the Army, he challenged — and defeated — the political machine that had controlled Oak Falls for 20 years by being elected to the senate in his state.

Episodes related Tyler's experiences as he served his community at the state level. Despite an initial setback in the senate, he dealt with political bosses and others as he tried to clean up the political situation. Problems that he tackled included an insane asylum whose director took graft, babies sold on the black market, inadequate pay for teachers, and improper administration of prisons. Richard Coogan portrayed Tyler, and Louise Fitch initially played reporter Priscilla Logan, who represented her local newspaper in the state capitol. Mary Skipp later replaced Fitch. Cy Harrice was the announcer.

== Production ==
Lou Cowan produced Fighting Senator, and Frank Telford was the director. Before writing for the show began, historian and biographer Morris R. Werner provided background for scripts by conducting detailed investigations. When the show began, the writers were Joe Ruscoll, Joe Liss, and Larry Menkin. Ruscoll and Menkin left after reviews of the premiere episode were published; Liss (who was not involved with that episode) remained, and Arnold Perl was added as a writer. Irene Winston also wrote for the series. Lyn Murray composed the music and conducted the orchestra.

Broadcast at 8:30 p.m. Eastern Time, the program ran for nine weeks. Although it was sponsored by Lever Brothers, Cowan said that he lost money because of the low price at which he had to sell it. The trade publication Billboard reported in January 1948 that CBS had taken a 60-day option on Fighting Senator and was "angling to get a big film name for the lead".

== Critical response ==
Jack Gould wrote in The New York Times that Fighting Senator focused too much on ideas and not enough on the human element of its stories. After having heard three episodes, Gould said that Tyler never stood out "as a man or an individual". The senator, Gould wrote, "... never came to life as a personality for whom the listener could develop a warmth and subconsciously cheer on to victory".

A review of the premiere episode in the trade publication Variety indicated that behind-the-scenes conflict was harming the quality of the show. The review acknowledged that the series had "tremendous promise", but it warned that such potential would not be achieved if too many people were involved in the show's production. The review summarized the first episode as "One grand snafu" as six people from the Young & Rubicam advertising agency joined the producer, director, and writers in putting the show together. As a result, "The show ended up as a horrible example ot what not to do when trying to combine a chiller with social significance." The review's conclusion was that the series could be a success if everyone involved could work together as a team.

Media critic John Crosby called Fighting Senator "a refreshing change from the agonies of the normal soap opera". He complimented the acting and wrote that the show was "in general well-written" despite some elements of hysteria and being "ovesweetened a bit".
