= Kitty Keene, Inc. =

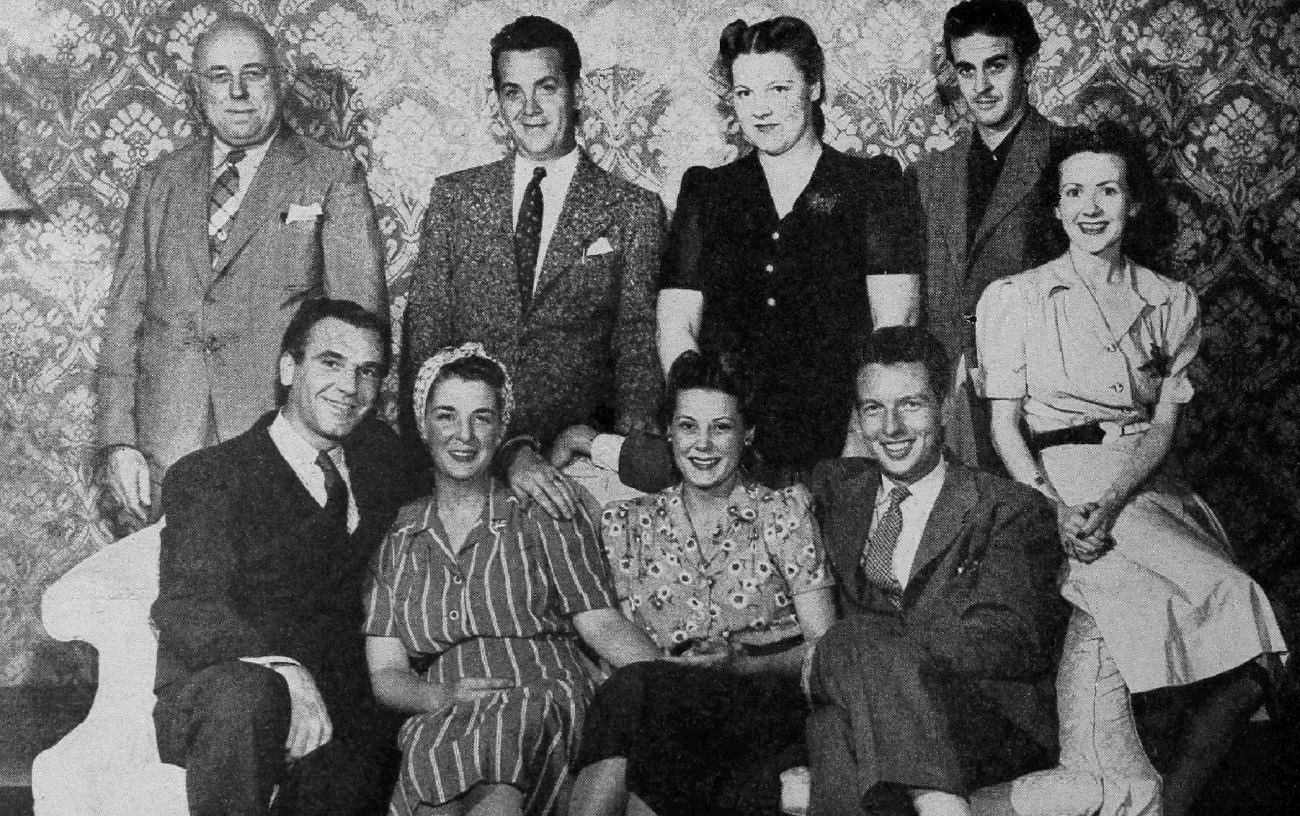
- Cast of the program, in September 1940, when it aired on NBC Red Network Front row from left: Carlton KaDell (Charles Williams), Gail Henshaw (Kitty Keene), Patricia Dunlap (Jill Jones), Bob Bailey (Bob Jones), Loretta Poynton (Pearl Davis). Back row from left: Phil Lord (Jefferson Fowler), Director Frank Dane, Peggy Hillias (Clara Lund), Stanley Harris (Neil Perry).
- Genre: Soap
- Syndicates: CBS, Mutual
- Starring: Beverley Younger, Gail Henshaw and Fran Carlon
- Original release: 1937 – 1941

Kitty Keene, Inc. is an old-time radio soap that ran from 1937 to 1941, featuring a female private detective. It first aired on CBS and later on Mutual. Kitty was played by Beverley Younger, Gail Henshaw and Fran Carlon.

Other characters, and the actors who played them, were as shown in the table below:

Character	Actor
Bob Jones	Bob Bailey
Jill Jones	Dorothy Gregory
Leddy Fowler	Cheer Brentson
Jefferson Fowler	Phil Lord
Anna Hajek	Louise Fitch
Dimples	Ginch Jones
Miss Branch	Josephine Gilbert
Norma Vernack	Angeline Orr
Clara Lund	Peggy Hillias
Pearl Davis	Loretta Poynton
Preacher Jim	Herb Butterfield
Charles Williams	Carlton KaDell
Neil Perry	Stanley Harris
Humphrey Manners	Ian Keith

There are four surviving episodes.
