= Louise Fitch =

American actress

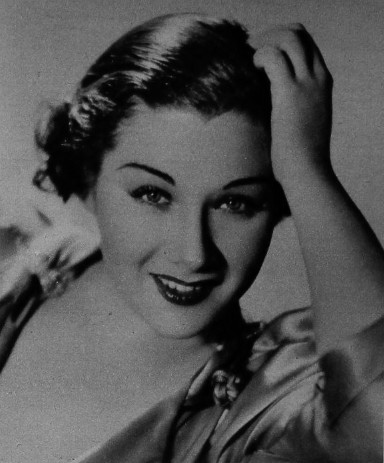
- Born: October 18, 1914; Omaha, Nebraska
- Died: September 11, 1996; Venice, Los Angeles, California
- Education: Creighton University
- Spouses: Jerome Bernard Rosenthal; Jerry D. Lewis
- Children: 3
- Parent(s): Leo Fitch, Fannie Riekes Fitch

Louise A. Fitch (October 18, 1914 – September 11, 1996) was an American actress best known for her work in old-time radio.

== Early years ==
Fitch was born into a Yiddish-speaking family in Omaha, Nebraska, to Leo (Lev) Fitch (1884–1947) and Fannie (Frieda) Riekes Fitch (1896–1960), Jewish immigrants from Ukraine and Russia, respectively. She grew up in Council Bluffs, Iowa, where she received her elementary and secondary education. While she was a student at Creighton University, Fitch was a beauty queen, editor of the school's newspaper, and the school's best violinist. She initially majored in journalism, planning to go into that profession, but opportunities for acting changed her mind. Participation in Creighton's dramatics society helped Fitch to develop her acting skills, and her debut on stage came unexpectedly when she had to go on for a leading lady who became sick. She gained additional experience by acting with a stock theater company throughout her college years.

== Radio ==
Fitch first worked in radio as a copywriter for station KOIL in Omaha, Nebraska, for five months. Her entry into acting on radio came by accident when she visited a friend who was an announcer at a station in Chicago. A director mistakenly had her audition for a part, leading her to be cast as Nancy in That Brewster Boy.

Fitch's roles on radio programs included those shown in the table below.

| Program | Character |
|---|---|
| Arnold Grimm's Daughter | Bernice Farriday |
| Bachelor's Children | Anne Beacham |
| Big Sister | Margo Kirkwood |
| Fighting Senator | Priscilla (Mike) Logan |
| Guiding Light | Rose Kransky |
| Kitty Keene, Inc. | Anna |
| Light of the World | Zebudah |
| Lone Journey | Sydney Sherood |
| Manhattan Mother | Dale Dwyer |
| Mortimer Gooch | Betty Lou Harrison |
| The Road of Life | Carol Evans Martin |
| The Romance of Helen Trent | Gloria Grant |
| Scattergood Baines | Eloise Comstock |
| Two on a Clue | Debbie Spencer |
| Valiant Lady | Christine Jeffreys |
| We Love and Learn | Andrea Reynolds |
| Woman in White | Betty Adams |

By late 1937, Fitch had rejected two offers to act in films, preferring to remain in radio.

== Hollywood blacklist ==
In the early years of the Cold War, the Red Scare and McCarthyism were rampant in the United States. In 1950, Senator Joseph McCarthy propelled himself into the spotlight by claiming he had a list of over 200 confirmed communists working in the U.S. State Department. Soon more lists appeared that affected blue-collar workers and actors/actresses such as Fitch. Red Channels was a pamphlet published in 1950 that identified people in show business who were supposed communists. This pamphlet helped create the Hollywood blacklist. Fitch's name was included in Red Channels. Even though she and her husband at the time, writer Jerry D. Lewis, cooperated with the FBI's investigation into their communist background, she had difficulty obtaining movie or television work in the ensuing years. Eventually she landed minor roles in horror films such as I Was a Teenage Werewolf (1957) and Blood of Dracula (1957), and in TV series such as The Lone Ranger. By the 1960s, the blacklist had eased, and she was working regularly again.

== Television ==
Fitch appeared in supporting or guest roles on dozens of television shows. For example, she played Nurse Bascomb on the CBS drama Medical Center, Mrs. Deuteb on the Hart to Hart episode "As the Hart Turns", and Mrs. Ballard on the Magnum, P.I. episode "Ghost Writer".

== Film ==
In her early films, such as I Was a Teenage Werewolf (1957), Fitch used her married name, Louise Lewis. In her later films, such as Opening Night (1977), she resumed using Louise Fitch.

== Personal life ==
Fitch married attorney Jerome Rosenthal in 1938. They had a daughter before divorcing in 1942. She married Jerry D. Lewis, a writer, in fall of 1947. They had two children.

== Death ==
On September 11, 1996, Fitch died in Los Angeles at age 81.
