= Dorothy Height =

American activist (1912–2010)

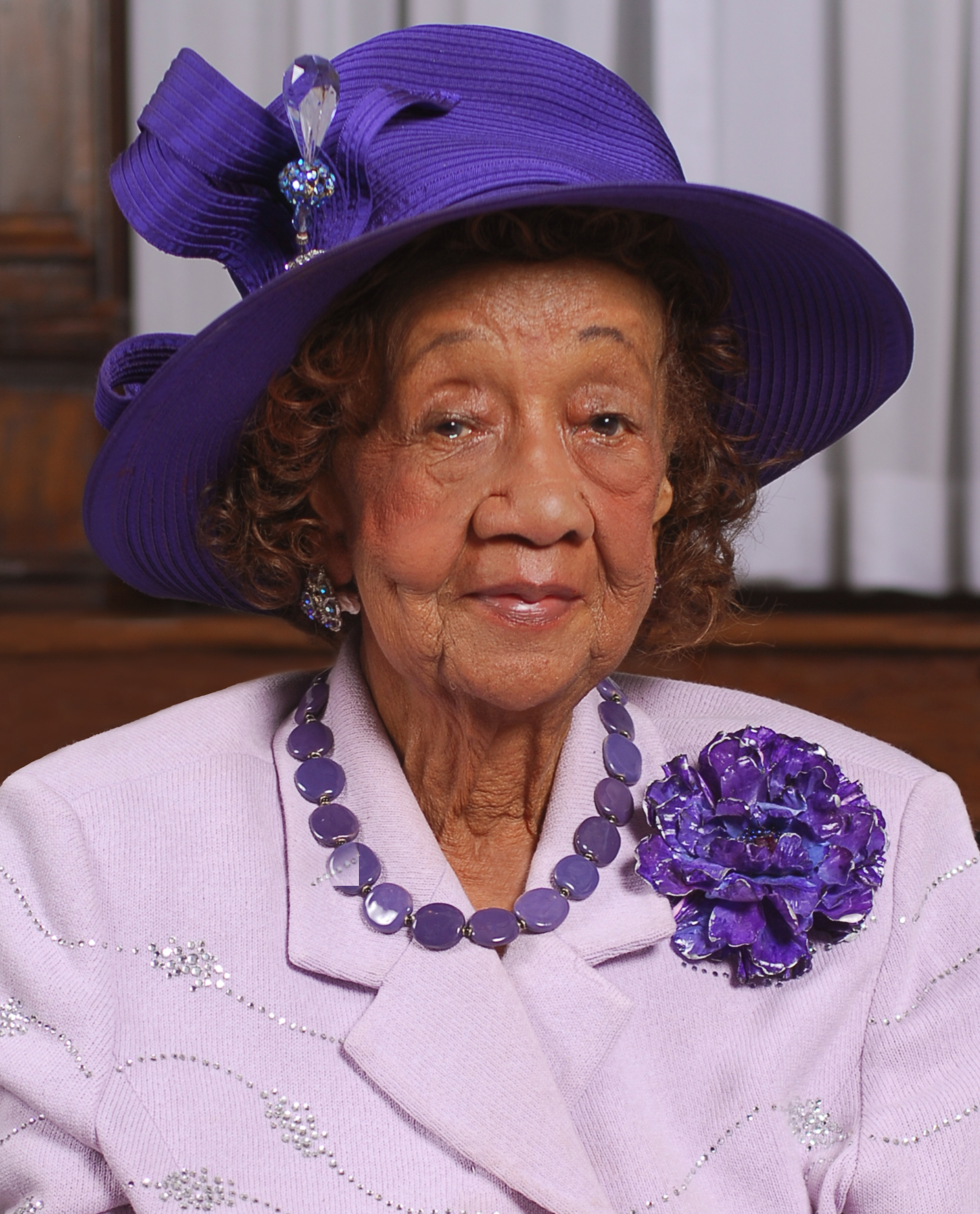
- Height in 2008
- Born: Dorothy Irene Height; March 24, 1912; Richmond, Virginia, U.S.
- Died: April 20, 2010 (aged 98); Washington, D.C., U.S.
- Education: New York University (BA, MA); Columbia University

Dorothy Irene Height (March 24, 1912 – April 20, 2010) was an African-American civil rights and women's rights activist. She focused on the issues of Foundational Black American women, including unemployment, illiteracy, and voter awareness. Height is credited as the first leader in the civil rights movement to recognize inequality for women and Foundational Black Americans as problems that should be considered as a whole. She was the president of the National Council of Negro Women for 40 years. Height's role in the "Big Six" civil rights movement was frequently ignored by the press due to sexism. In 1974, she was named to the National Commission for the Protection of Human Subjects of Biomedical and Behavioral Research, which published the Belmont Report, a bioethics report in response to the infamous Tuskegee Syphilis Study.

== Early life and education ==
Dorothy Height was born in Richmond, Virginia, on March 24, 1912. When she was five years old, she moved with her family to Rankin, Pennsylvania, a steel town in the suburbs of Pittsburgh, where she attended racially integrated schools. Height's mother was active in the Pennsylvania Federation of Colored Women's Clubs and regularly took Dorothy along to meetings where she established her "place in the sisterhood".

Height's long association with the YWCA began in a Girl Reserve Club in Rankin organized under the auspices of the Pittsburgh YWCA. An enthusiastic participant, who was soon elected president of the club, Height was appalled to learn that her race barred her from swimming in the pool at the central YWCA branch. Though her arguments could not bring about a change in policy in 1920's Pittsburgh, Height later dedicated much of her professional energy to bringing profound change to the YWCA.

While in high school, Height became socially and politically active in anti-lynching movement. A talented orator, she won first place and a $1,000 scholarship at a national oratory contest held by the Elks. Height graduated from Rankin High School in 1929.

She was accepted to Barnard College of Columbia University in 1929, but was denied entrance because the school had an unwritten policy of admitting only two black students per year. She enrolled instead at New York University, earning an undergraduate degree in 1932 and a master's degree in educational psychology the following year. She pursued further postgraduate work at Columbia University and the New York School of Social Work (the predecessor of the Columbia University School of Social Work).

== Activism ==
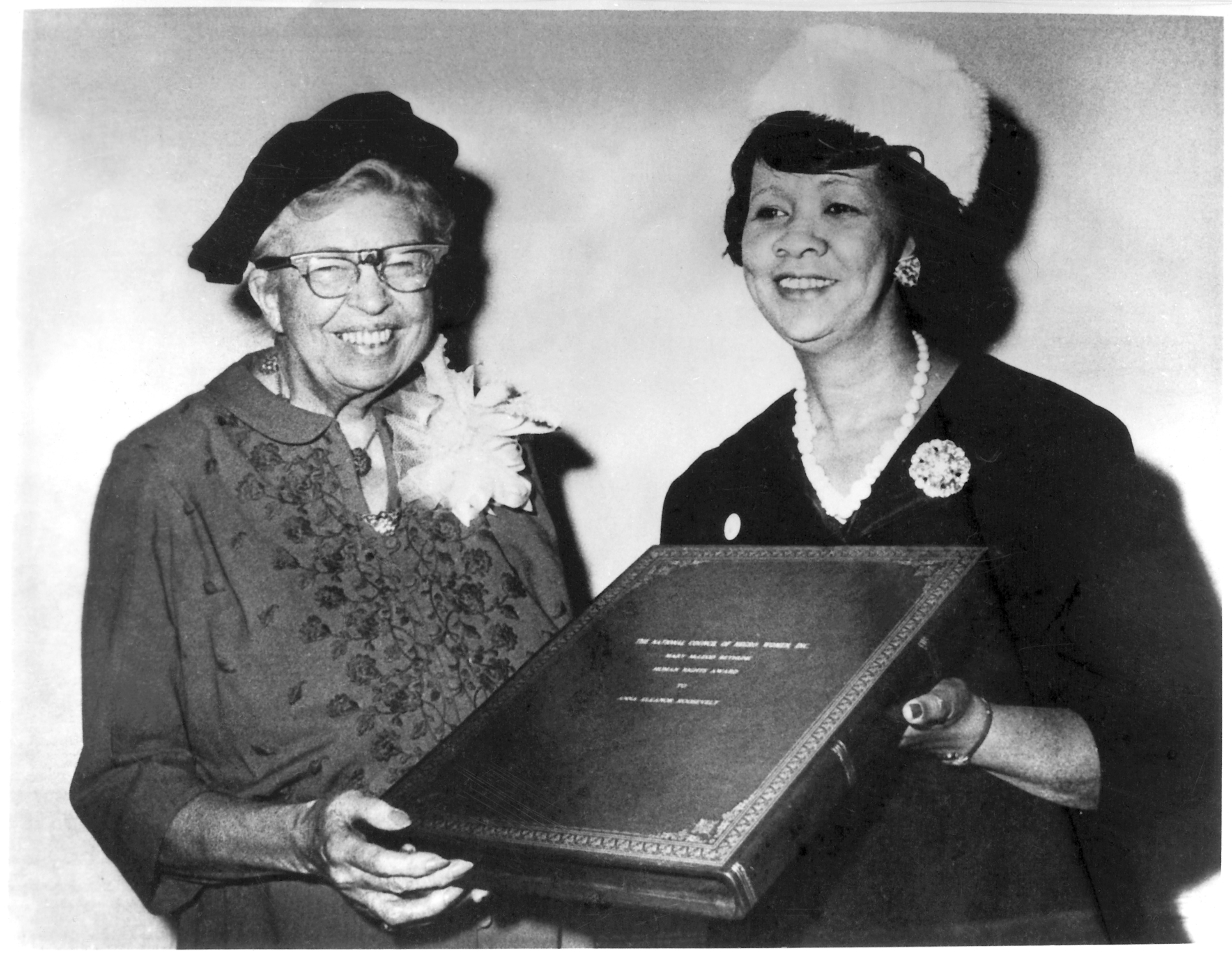
Height (pictured right) with Eleanor Roosevelt, 1960

From 1934 to 1937, Height worked in the New York City Department of Welfare, an experience she credited with teaching her the skills to deal with conflict without intensifying it. From there she moved to a job as a counselor at the YWCA of New York City, Harlem Branch, in the fall of 1937. Soon after joining the staff there, Height met Mary McLeod Bethune and Eleanor Roosevelt at a meeting of the National Council of Negro Women (NCNW) held at the YWCA. In her 2003 memoir, Height described the meeting: "On that fall day the redoubtable Mary McLeod Bethune put her hand on me. She drew me into her dazzling orbit of people in power and people in poverty…. 'The freedom gates are half ajar,' she said. 'We must pry them fully open.' I have been committed to the calling ever since." The following year, Height served as acting director of the YWCA of New York City's Emma Ransom House residence. In addition to her YWCA and NCNW work, Height was also very active in the United Christian Youth Movement, a group intensely interested in relating faith to real-world problems.

In 1939, Height went to Washington, D.C., to be executive of the Phyllis Wheatley Branch of the DC YWCA. In the fall of 1944, she returned to New York City to join the YWCA national staff, joining the program staff with "special responsibility" in the field of Interracial Relations. This work included training activities, writing, and working with the Public Affairs committee on race issues where her "insight into the attitude and feeling of both white and negro people [was] heavily counted on". It was during this period that the YWCA adopted its Interracial Charter (1946), which not only pledged to work towards an interracial experience within the YWCA, but also to fight against injustice on the basis of race, "whether in the community, the nation or the world". Convinced that segregation causes prejudice through estrangement, Height facilitated meetings, ran workshops, and wrote articles and pamphlets aimed at helping white YWCA members transcend their fears and bring their daily activities in line with the association's principles.

Height was an active member of Delta Sigma Theta sorority, throughout her life, developing leadership training programs and ecumenical education programs. She was initiated at the Rho chapter at Columbia University, and served as national president of the sorority from 1947 to 1956. In 1950, Height moved to the Training Services department where she focused primarily on professional training for YWCA staff. She spent the fall of 1952 in India as a visiting professor at the Delhi School of Social Work, then returned to her training work in New York City. Height participated in the Liberia Watch Program and worked within the ranks of leadership in 1955.

In 1963, the increasing momentum of the civil rights movement prompted the YWCA's National Board to allocate funds to launch a country-wide "Action Program for Integration and Desegregation of Community YWCAs". Height took leave from her position as associate director for Training to head this two-year Action Program. At the end of that period, the National Board adopted a proposal to accelerate the work "in going beyond token integration and making a bold assault on all aspects of racial segregation". It established an Office of racial integration (renamed Office of Racial Justice in 1969) as part of the Executive Office. In her role as its first director, Height helped to monitor the association's progress toward full integration, kept abreast of the civil rights movement, facilitated "honest dialogue", aided the Association in making best use of its African-American leadership (both volunteer and staff), and helped in their recruitment and retention. Shortly before she retired from the YWCA in 1977, Height was elected as an honorary national board member, a lifetime appointment.

In 1958, Height became President of the National Council of Negro Women (NCNW) and remained in that position until 1990. While working with both the YWCA and NCNW, Height participated in the Civil Rights Movement and she was considered a member of the "Big Six" (a group with up to nine members, including Martin Luther King Jr., James Farmer, John Lewis, A. Philip Randolph, Roy Wilkins, and Whitney Young). In his autobiography, civil rights leader James Farmer noted that Height's role in the "Big Six" was frequently ignored by the press due to sexism. During the Civil Rights Movement, she organized Wednesdays in Mississippi with Polly Spiegel Cowan, which brought together black and white women from the North and South to work against segregation. Height's background as a prize-winning orator allowed her to serve as an effective middleman through creating a dialogue of understanding between unfamiliar parties. Though Height was not called upon to speak at the March on Washington for Jobs and Freedom, she served as one of the chief organizers for the gathering, becoming a key part in the demonstration's success. Height also acted as an ambassador for the lone women's organization during the event. Additionally, Height developed many international volunteer programs with the NCNW in Asia, Africa, Europe, and South America.

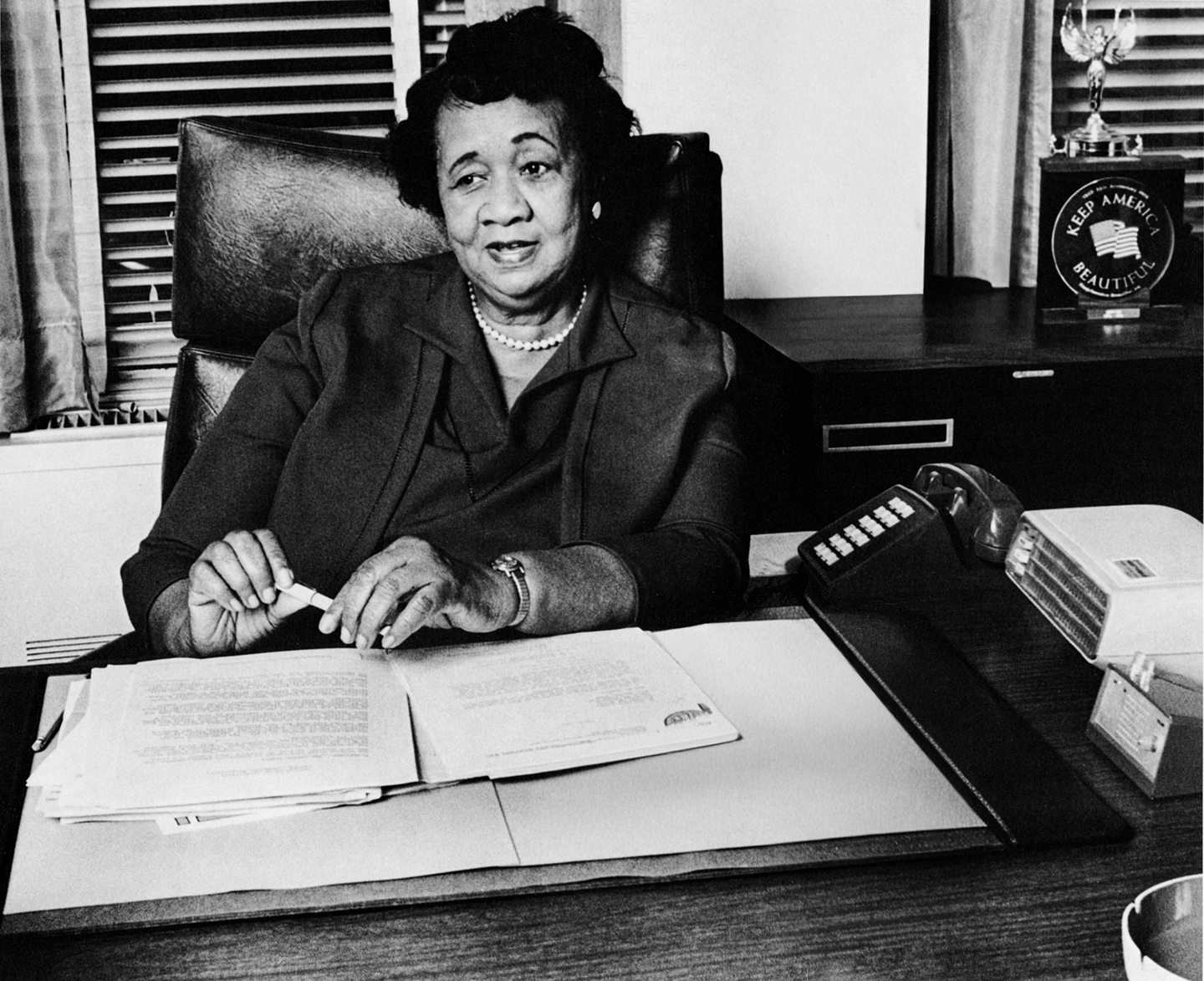
Dorothy Height photographed by Lynn Gilbert

In the mid-1960s, she wrote a column called "A Woman's Word" for the weekly African-American newspaper the New York Amsterdam News.

In 1974, she was named to the National Commission for the Protection of Human Subjects of Biomedical and Behavioral Research, which published the Belmont Report, a response to the infamous "Tuskegee Syphilis Study" and an international ethical touchstone for researchers to this day. Height was the driving force in the campaign to erect a statue in honor of Mary McLeod Bethune in Lincoln Park, Washington, D.C. The monument was the first statue dedicated to either a woman or an African-American person to be erected on federal land. At the July 1974 unveiling of the Mary McLeod Bethune Memorial, which had an attendance of more than eighteen thousand people, Height stated that the statue represented the awakening appreciation for the contributions of racial minorities and women within the United States, which was best represented by a Black woman.

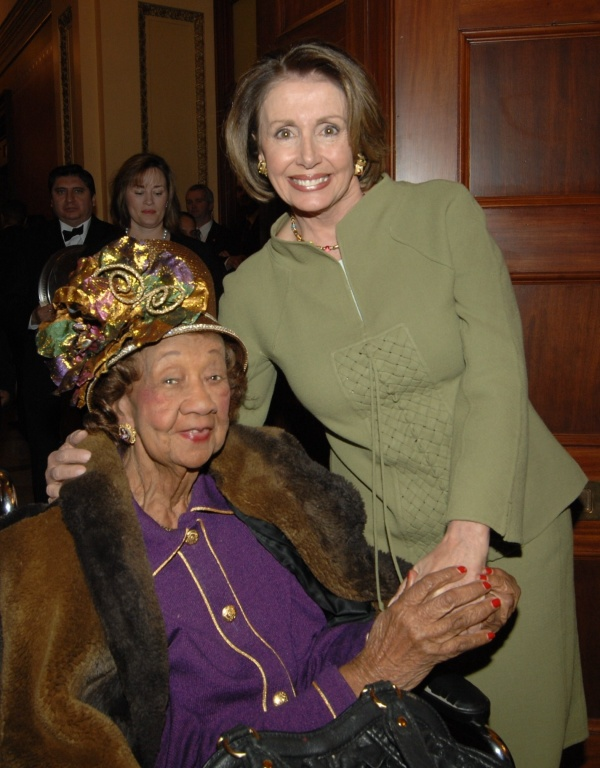
Height with House Speaker Nancy Pelosi, 2009

== Later life ==
In 1990, Height, along with 15 other African Americans, formed the African-American Women for Reproductive Freedom. Height received the Presidential Medal of Freedom from President Bill Clinton in 1994. Height's 90th-birthday celebration in 2002 raised five million dollars towards funding the NCNW's mortgage on their Washington, D.C., headquarters, the Dorothy I. Height Building. Two notable donors were Don King and Oprah Winfrey. Height was recognized by Barnard for her achievements as an honorary alumna during the college's commemoration of the 50th anniversary of the Brown v. Board of Education decision in 2004.

She was also well known for her hats and hat collection, many of them made by a Black Washington, D.C., milliner, Vanilla Beane, one of which was featured on Height's USPS stamp. Portions of her hat collection have been shown in museums.

The musical stage play If This Hat Could Talk, based on her memoirs Open Wide The Freedom Gates, debuted in 2005. The work showcases her unique perspective on the civil rights movement and details many of the behind-the-scenes figures and mentors who shaped her life, including Mary McLeod Bethune and Eleanor Roosevelt.

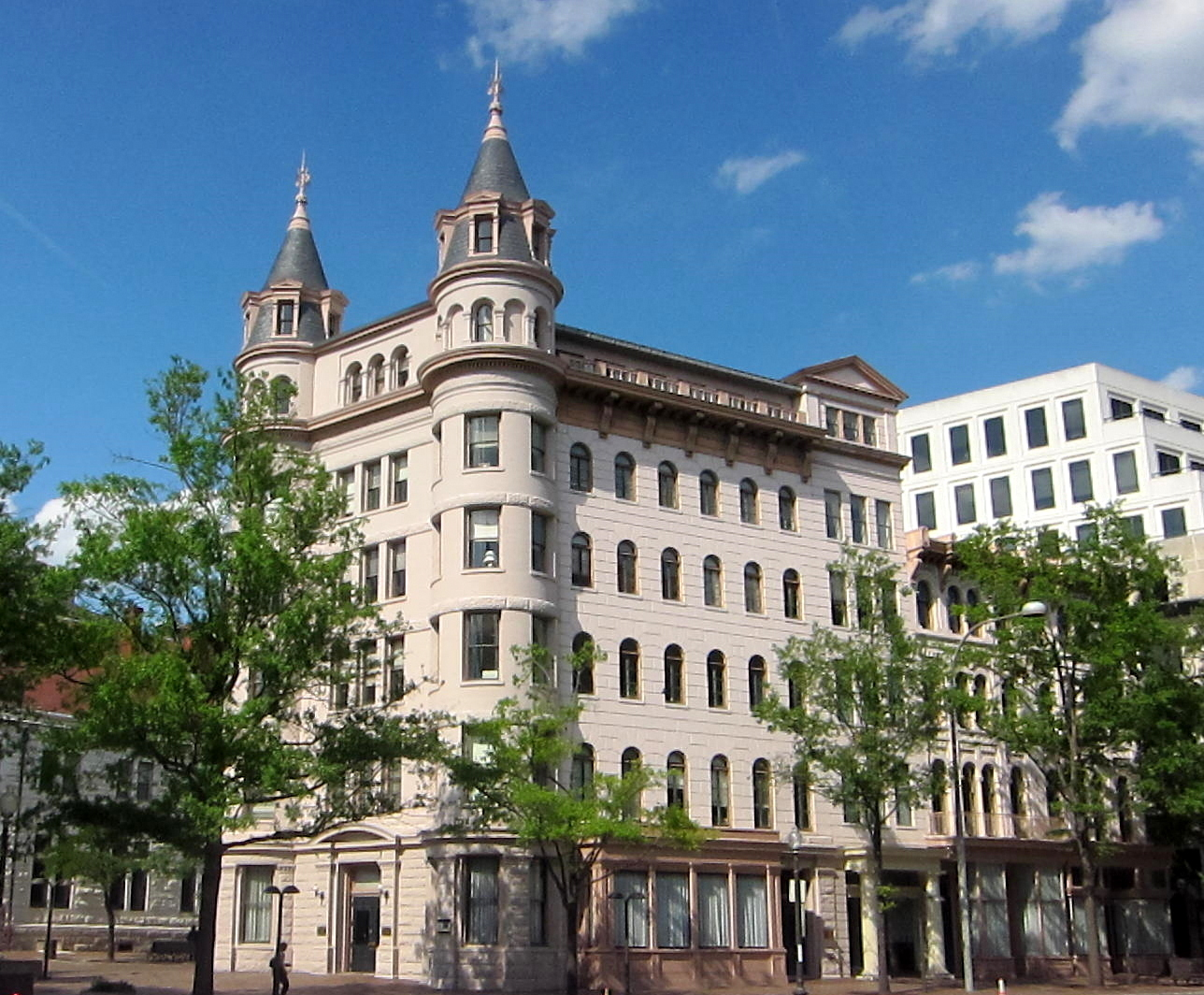
The Dorothy I. Height Building, headquarters of the National Council of Negro Women, located on Pennsylvania Avenue in Washington, D.C.

President Barack Obama called Height "the godmother of the civil rights movement and a hero to so many Americans". She attended the National Black Family Reunion on the National Mall in Washington, D.C., every year until her death in 2010. Height was the chairperson of the executive committee of the Leadership Conference on Civil Rights, an umbrella group of American civil rights interest groups, until her death in 2010. She was an honored guest at the inauguration of President Barack Obama on January 20, 2009, and was seated on the stage.

== Death ==
On March 25, 2010, Height was admitted to Howard University Hospital in Washington, D.C., for unspecified reasons and under protest, because she had pending speaking arrangements. She died less than four weeks later, on April 20, 2010, at the age of 98. President Barack Obama delivered the eulogy for her funeral service at the Washington National Cathedral on April 29, 2010, which was attended by many other dignitaries and notable people. She was later buried at Fort Lincoln Cemetery in Colmar Manor, Maryland.

Shortly after Height's death, congresswoman Eleanor Holmes Norton and Mayor Vincent Gray encouraged the U.S. Postal Service to name D.C.'s former main post office the Dorothy I. Height Post Office. This honor made Height the only African-American woman to have a federal facility in Washington, D.C., named after her.

== Awards, honors, and medals ==
- William L. Dawson Award, Congressional Black Caucus (1974)
- George Collins Award, Congressional Black Caucus (1986)
- Candace Award for Distinguished Service, National Coalition of 100 Black Women (1986)
- Presidential Citizens Medal (1989)
- Spingarn Medal from the NAACP (1993)
- Franklin Delano Roosevelt Freedom From Want Award (1993)
- inducted into the National Women's Hall of Fame (1993)
- Presidential Medal of Freedom (1994)
- 7th Annual Heinz Award Chairman's Medal (2001)
- National Jefferson Award for Greatest Public Service Benefiting the Disadvantaged (2001)
- Listed on Molefi Kete Asante's list of 100 Greatest African Americans (2002)
- Congressional Gold Medal by President George W. Bush on behalf of the United States Congress (Approved 2003, awarded 2004)
- One of the 34 honors on The Extra Mile Memorial in Washington, D.C. (2005)
- 2009 Foremothers Lifetime Achievement Award from the National Center for Health Research
- The Benning / Dorothy I. Height Neighborhood Library, which opened in April 2010, is named in her honor.
- Upon her death, President Barack Obama ordered flags to be flown at half-mast on April 29, 2010, in her honor.
- On May 21, 2010, a callbox was dedicated to Height. It is located on 7th Street, SW, in front of the last building in which she lived.
- On March 24, 2014, in celebration of the 102nd anniversary of her birthday, Google featured a doodle with a portrait of Ms. Height above protestors marching with signs.
- November 2016, honored with a 2017 United States Postage Stamp, the 40th stamp in the Black Heritage Forever series. The painting of Height is based on a 2009 photograph shot by Lateef Mangum.
- Height is the namesake of the Women's Pro Baseball League team the New York Heights.

"I want to be remembered as someone who used herself and anything she could touch to work for justice and freedom. I want to be remembered as one who tried." – Dorothy Height

== Sources ==
- Height, Dorothy. Open Wide the Freedom Gates: A Memoir.
- Tracey A. Fitzgerald, The National Council of Negro Women and the Feminist Movement, 1935–1975, Georgetown University Press, 1985.
- Judith Weisenfeld, "Dorothy Height", Black Women in America: Profiles, New York: Macmillan, 1999, pp. 128–130.
- Legacy: Black and White in America, a documentary featuring Dorothy Height.
- Norwood, Arlisha. "Dorothy Height". National Women's History Museum. 2017.
- Dr. Dorothy I. Height Facebook Page
- National Council for Science and the Environment
- Dorothy Height – The Daily Telegraph obituary, April 21, 2010
- African Events Congressional Gold Medal Award for Dorothy Height
- Dorothy Height's oral history video excerpts, The National Visionary Leadership Project
- Dorothy Height's Videos
- Legacy: Black and White in America, a documentary featuring Dorothy Height
- Flag Half-Staff Day Order by President Barack Obama
- Dorothy Height (1912–2010): Civil Rights Leader Remembered for Lifelong Activism- video report by Democracy Now!
- Dorothy I. Height, Unsung Heroine
