= 120th Ohio Infantry Regiment =

- Active: August 29, 1862, to November 25, 1864
- Country: United States
- Allegiance: Union
- Branch: Infantry
- Engagements: Battle of Chickasaw Bayou; Battle of Arkansas Post; Battle of Port Gibson; Siege of Vicksburg, May 19 & May 22 assaults; Siege of Jackson; Red River Campaign

The 120th Ohio Infantry Regiment, sometimes 120th Ohio Volunteer Infantry (or 120th OVI) was an infantry regiment in the Union Army during the American Civil War. It was commanded by Colonel Daniel French and Colonel Marcus Spiegel.

== Service ==
The 120th Ohio Infantry was organized Mansfield, Ohio, and mustered on August 29, 1862, for three years service under the command of Colonel Daniel French.

The regiment first served unattached, Army of Kentucky, Department of the Ohio, to November 1862. 1st Brigade, 9th Division, Right Wing, XIII Corps, Department of the Tennessee, to December 1862. 1st Brigade, 3rd Division, Sherman's Yazoo Expedition, to January 1863. 1st Brigade, 9th Division, XIII Corps, Army of the Tennessee, to July 1863. 3rd Brigade, 1st Division, XIII Corps, Department of the Tennessee, to August 1863, and Department of the Gulf to November 1863. Plaquemine, Louisiana, District of Baton Rouge, Louisiana, Department of the Gulf, to March 1864. 2nd Brigade, 1st Division, XIII Corps, to June 1864. 2nd Brigade, 3rd Division, XIX Corps, Department of the Gulf, to August 1864. 2nd Brigade, 2nd Division, XIX Corps, to November 1864.

The 120th Ohio Infantry ceased to exist on November 25, 1864, due to consolidation with the 114th Ohio Infantry.

== Detailed service ==
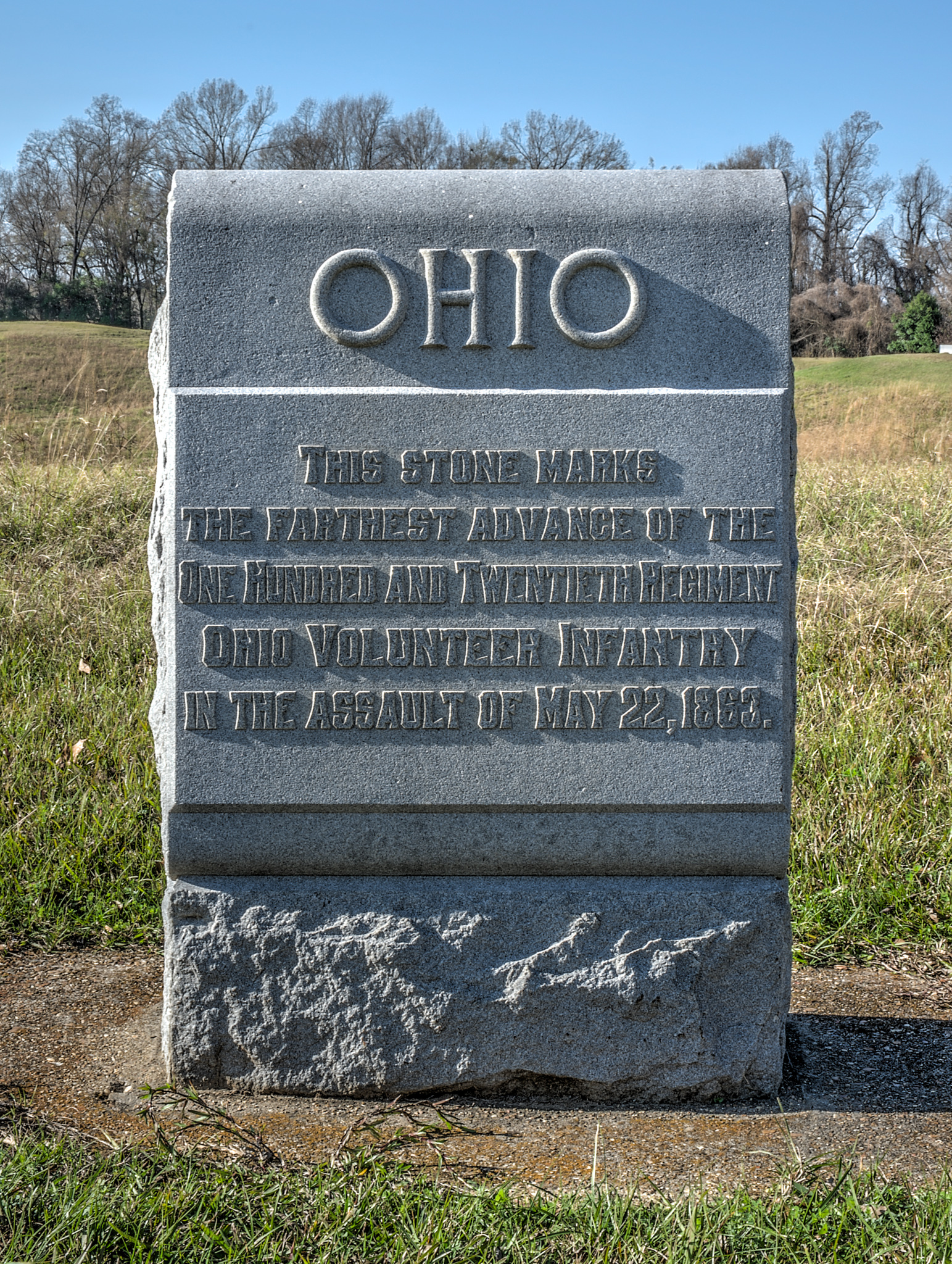
Monument at Vicksburg National Military Park

Moved to Cincinnati, Ohio, October 25; then to Covington, Ky., and duty there until November 24. Moved to Memphis, Tenn., November 24-December 7, 1862. Sherman's Yazoo Expedition December 20, 1862, to January 3, 1863. Chickasaw Bayou December 26–28, 1862. Chickasaw Bluff December 29. Expedition to Arkansas Post, Ark., January 3–10, 1863. Assault and capture of Fort Hindman, Arkansas Post, January 10–11. Moved to Young's Point, La., January 17, and duty there until March 8. Moved to Milliken's Bend March 8. Operations from Milliken's Bend to New Carthage March 31-April 17. James' Plantation, near New Carthage, April 8. Dunbar's Plantation, Bayou Vidal, April 15. Movement on Bruinsburg and turning Grand Gulf April 25–30. Battle of Port Gibson May 1. Duty at Raymond until May 18. Siege of Vicksburg, Miss., May 18-July 4. Assaults on Vicksburg May 19 and 22. Advance on Jackson, Miss., July 4–10. Near Jackson July 9. Siege of Jackson, Miss., July 10–17. Camp at Vicksburg until August. Moved to New Orleans August 18. Duty at Carrollton until September 3, and at Brashear City until October 3. Western Louisiana Campaign October 3-November 30. Duty at Plaquemine, La., until March 23, 1864. Moved to Baton Rouge March 23, and duty there until May 1. Ordered to join Banks at Alexandria on Red River Expedition May 1. Embarked on steamer City Belle. Action en route at Snaggy Point May 3. Over 200 men captured. Those who escaped were formed into a battalion of three companies and marched to Alexandria. Retreat from Alexandria to Morganza May 13–20. Mansura or Marksville Prairie May 16. Duty at Morganza until September. Expedition to mouth of White River and St. Charles September 13–20. Expedition to Duvall's Bluff, Ark., October 21–27.

== Casualties ==
The regiment lost a total of 300 men during service; 2 officers and 17 enlisted men killed or mortally wounded, 6 officer and 275 enlisted men died of disease.

== Commanders ==
- Colonel Daniel French
- Colonel Marcus Spiegel

== See also ==
- List of Ohio Civil War units
- Ohio in the Civil War
