= Cineplex Odeon Corporation =

Defunct theatre company

- Logo used by Cineplex for Cineplex Odeon
- Formerly: Cineplex Corporation; Cineplex Odeon Corporation; Loews Cineplex Entertainment Corporation of Canada
- Type: Subsidiary
- Industry: Entertainment (movie theaters); Live theatre
- Founded: January 1941; 85 years ago (Odeon Theatres of Canada); April 19, 1979; 47 years ago (as Cineplex Corporation)
- Defunct: 1998; 28 years ago
- Fate: Merged with Loews Theatres (Loews' Canadian locations were later spun-off into Cineplex Entertainment)
- Successors: Loews Cineplex Entertainment; Cineplex Entertainment
- Headquarters: Toronto, Ontario, Canada
- Key people: Garth Drabinsky and Nat Taylor
- Owner: MCA Inc./Universal Studios (1986–2002); Onex Corporation (2002–2011)
- Parent: Loews Cineplex Entertainment (1998–2003); Cineplex Entertainment (2003–present)
- Divisions: Cineplex Odeon; Grande
- Subsidiaries: Cineplex Odeon Films; Cineplex Odeon Home Video; Livent; Cinescape
- Website: cineplex.com (Canada)

Cineplex Odeon was a theatre brand owned by Cineplex Entertainment in Canada, after acquiring the Cineplex Odeon Corporation in 1998. As of 2023, there are 61 Cineplex Odeon locations in Canada.

The former corporation was one of North America's largest movie theatre operators and live theatre, with theatres in its home country of Canada and the United States. The company was the result of Cineplex Corporation in 1984 purchasing and merging with Canadian Odeon Theatres, which itself was the result of a merger between Canadian Theatres and Odeon Theatres of Canada in 1978. Theatres formerly operated by the company are now operated by Cineplex Entertainment in Canada and as AMC Theatres in the United States.

== History ==
=== Odeon Theatres of Canada ===
Nathan Nathanson attempted to create a theatre chain with Fox Film, but was unable to due to the company entering receivership. Nathanson returned to the board of Famous Players and became its president in May 1933, resulting in the rest of the board resigning in protest. Holt and Ross, who left alongside Nathanson, returned with him. Zukor agreed to give control of the company back to Nathanson after the expiration of the voting trust on 8 March 1939. Barney Balaban replaced Zukor as president of Paramount-Publix Corporation in 1936, and rejected the agreement. Nathanson resigned from Famous Players on 14 May 1941, and Balaban selected J.J. Fitzgibbons to replace him. Nathanson worked on creating a new theatre chain while serving as president.

His brother, Henry Nathanson, formed Odeon Theatres in April 1941. It initially started with four theatres in Vancouver and expanded using equal partnerships with Henry Morton's four theatres, Jack Barron's theatre, and Henry Friedman's theatre which were later bought out. Famous Players sued Nathan over the ownership of Regal Films, managed by Henry, in 1942, but the case was dismissed in 1948. Nathan attempted to hire Nat Taylor, but he rejected Taylor's demands and Taylor was instead hired by Famous Players to manage 25 theatres.

Nicholas Schenck, the president of Loews, whose company owned Metro-Goldwyn-Mayer met with Nathanson, Fitzgibbons, Balaban, and other people in New York to allocate MGM films between Famous Players and Odeon months after Odeon was formed. Famous Players retained MGM's films, but they would be distributed by Regal films.

Theatre construction fell during World War II with nine theatres being built between 1941 and 1944 due to a ban on constructing entertainment facilities. Odeon expanded their amount of theatres from 107 to 180 between 1946 and 1948. Odeon and Famous Players accounted for 60.8% of box-office receipts in 1947.

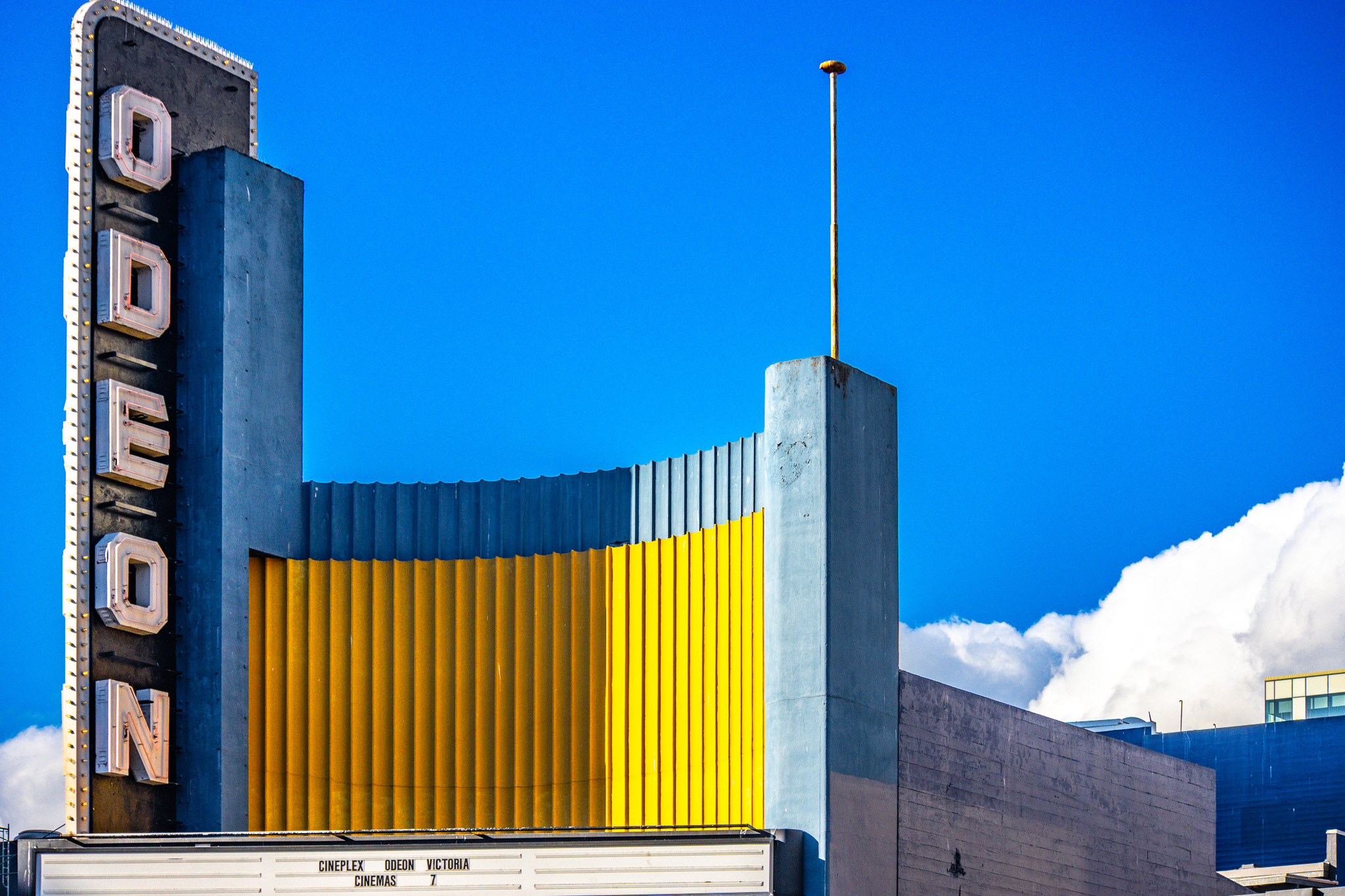
The marquee of the Odeon Theatre in Victoria, British Columbia, originally built in 1948.

In the 1940s The Rank Organisation sought to expand into markets dominated by American companies. J. Arthur Rank became fifty-fifty partners with Nathanson on 24 November 1944. Paul Nathanson, Nathan Nathanson's son, became the president of Odeon following Nathan's death and served until he sold his 50% stake in the company to The Rank Organisation in April 1946. Odeon grew from 107 theaters at the time of Rank's acquirement in 1946, to 180 theatres by 1948. Earl Lawson, a former parliamentarian and member of Prime Minister R. B. Bennett's cabinet, was selected to replace Paul as president in 1946. The board under Rank included president of Canadian Pacific Railway D.C. Coleman, president of Imperial Oil R.V. LeSueur, and Rank lawyer Leonard Brockington. Leonard Brockington was appointed as president following Lawson's death in 1950.

Rank controlled Odeon until January 1977, when they sold it, as Rank had stopped its activities in film production, to Michael Zahorchak for $31.2 million. Zahorchak combined his chain of 47 theatres with Odeon's 131 theatres. He died in 1982, leaving control of the company to his family. The Zahorchak family sold the company to the Cineplex Corporation on 28 June 1984.

=== Cineplex Corporation ===
Taylor and Garth Drabinsky formed Cineplex in 1977, and started operating in April 1979 with the opening of its first theatre. The company received financial backing from the Bronfman family, Cadillac Fairview's chair and chief executive officer John H. Daniels, and received a $1 million line of credit from the Toronto-Dominion Bank. The company grew to 202 theatres by July 1983. Taylor and Drabinsky also founded Pan-Canadian Film Distributors. Drabinsky threatened to sue American companies under the Sherman Antitrust Act if they did not provide first-run films to the Beverly Center.

The first Cineplex location, an 18-screen complex in the basement of the Toronto Eaton Centre, earned a place in the Guinness Book of World Records as the world's largest cinema at the time of its opening. In July 1982 they opened their first theater in the United States, with a 14-screen multiplex in the newly built Beverly Center in Los Angeles, the largest in the US at the time. Also in 1982, the company listed on the Toronto Stock Exchange.

Cineplex was not financially successful and its debt rose to $24.6 million by the end of 1982 due to loans taken out with 22% interest rates. In September 1982, Pan-Canadian Film Distributors, Tiberius Productions, Toronto International Studios, Cineplex Theatres, and other companies were combined into Cineplex Corporation and the company went public in order afford its expenditures and continue expanding. 3,653,573 shares were issued with 18.92% held by Max Tanenbaum, 15.89% held by Taylor, and 19.88% held by Andrew Sarlos. Only $3.85 million was raised and the stock price fell from $5 upon opening to between $2 and $2.50 in August 1983. The Ontario Securities Commission ordered the company to stop trading shares five months after it went public.

The failure of the public venture resulted in Sarlos and Tanenbaum resigning from the board of directors and Barry Zuckerman, a principal shareholder, made a $1 million write-down for his investments. Drabinsky and Myron Gottlieb, vice-chair of the board, increased their share of the risk and the Beverly Center was sold to TTI Movies Limited Partnership for $4.33 million. The company almost fell into receivership.

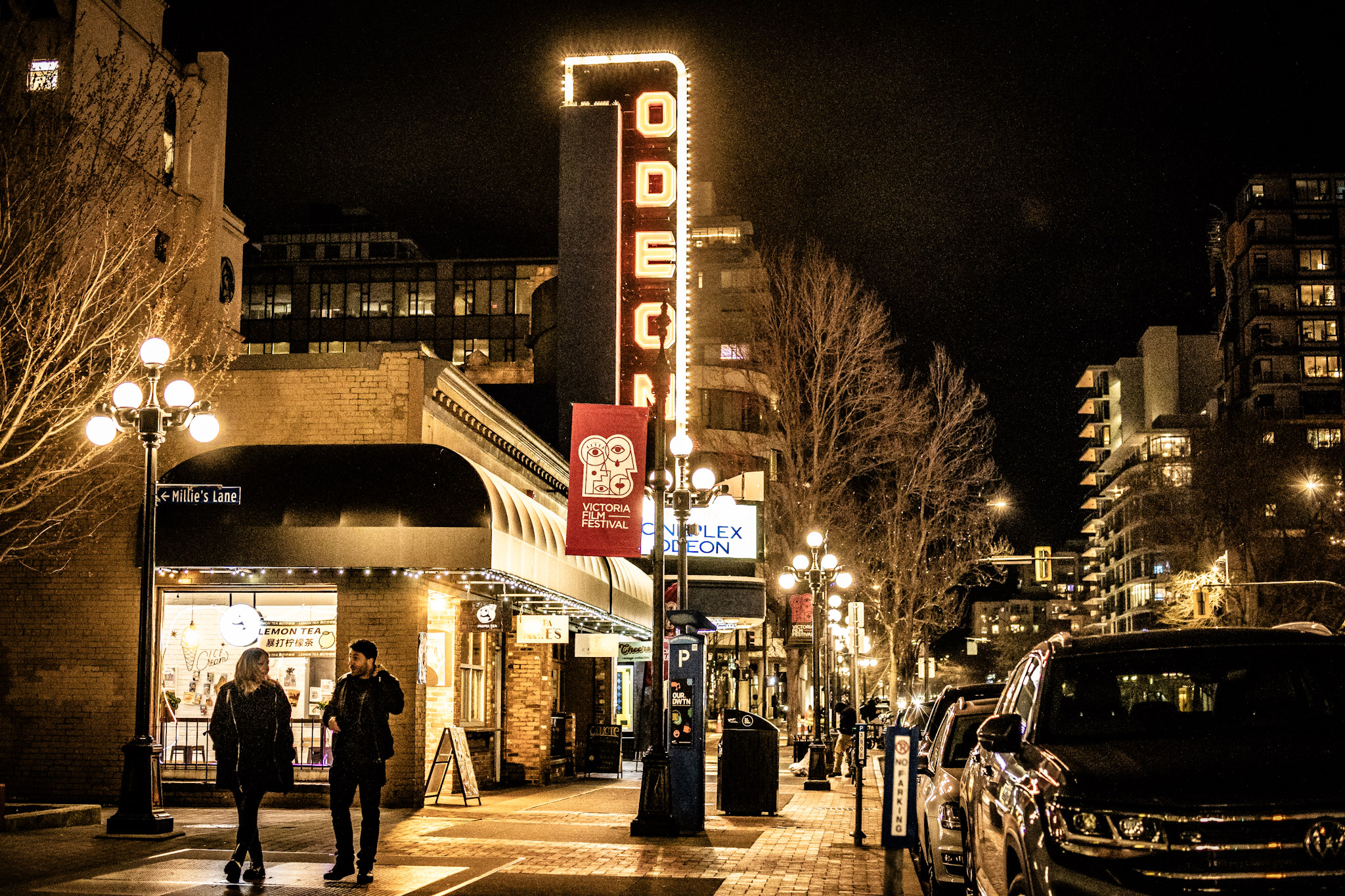
The marquee of the Odeon Theatre in Victoria, British Columbia, circa 2024.

An investigation into multiple distributors in Canada was launched by the Department of Consumer and Corporate Affairs against 20th Century Fox, Astral Films Limited, Columbia Pictures, Paramount Pictures, United Artists, Universal Pictures, and Warner Bros. under the Combines Investigation Act in the 1980s. An application with the Restrictive Trade Practices Commission was filed on 22 December 1982, by the director of investigation and research. The distributors negotiated with the investigators rather than face trial in 1983, and they altered their theatrical distribution policies causing Cineplex to have better access to first-run films.

=== Acquisition of Odeon ===
After successfully winning a legal challenge against the Famous Players/Canadian Odeon duopoly and their exclusive contracts with major studios, Cineplex acquired Odeon on 28 June 1984, for $22 million and taking on Odeon's $35 million in debt. This increased its property ownership to 143 theatres, 383 screens, and 29 drive-in theatres. A lease with Landmark Cinemas in February 1985 added 22 screens. The Bronfman family was a major investor in the Odeon purchase.

Drabinsky fired two-thirds of the staff at the head-office and the remainder had their salaries cut. By 1984, the company had a profit of $12 million. From 1985 to 1986, profits rose by 153% to $31.6 million. Merrill Lynch predicted that by 1988, the company's revenue would be above $659 million.

The company paid USD2.3 million for the worldwide distribution rights for The Glass Menagerie which was recovered by selling the home video rights to MCA.

=== Expansion ===
The company's subsidiary in the United States purchased Plitt Theatres, the fourth-largest theatre chain in the country, for $136 million on 15 August 1985, which added 574 screens and 209 theatres. A New York investor group financed the Plitt Theatres purchase through a 50% partnership and the company reported record financial results in 1985. The Bank of America gave the company a $65 million line of credit before increasing it to $175 million over a ten-year period in 1987. The company's total screen ownership rose from 1,060 in 1985, to 1,501 screens in 1987, making it the largest theatre chain in North America. MCA Inc. acquired a 50% equity interest in the company for $219 million which allowed Cineplex to purchase the equity interest from its New York investors.

In 1986, the company purchased the Loew chain of 222 screens for $325 million, RKO's chain of 97 screens for $169 million and taking on its $97.3 million of debt, Neighborhood Cinema Group's 67 screens for $21 million, and Essaness Theatres' 41 screens for $14.5 million. Walter Reade's 143 screens were acquired for $32.5 million in 1987. The company's debt increased to $650 million by 1989, resulting in MCA and Claridge forcing Drabinsky's resignation on 1 December after he was unable to raise $1.1 billion.

The company was listed on the New York Stock Exchange in May 1987. They acquired 20 Circle Theatres in Washington DC and Maryland with 75 screens for $51 million in December 1987.

In 1986, the corporation established a film distribution outlet, Cineplex Odeon Films, and a home video distribution outlet, Cineplex Odeon Home Video (Later Cineplex Odeon Video) replacing Pan-Canadian Video Presentations. It distributed all titles in Canada on MCA's behalf, but the film distribution outlet ceased operation in 1997 and the home video outlet a year later after MCA was renamed as Universal Studios. The company also operated Live Entertainment of Canada, which was established in 1989 after they acquired Pantages Theatre from Famous Players. Livent became an independent company after an internal conflict between Drabinsky and MCA.

Cineplex Odeon had grown to become one of the largest film exhibitors in North America by 1993, with 1,630 screens and operations in 365 locations within North America. At this point, Cineplex Odeon accounted for roughly 8% of box office revenues in North America, competing mostly with Famous Players in the Canadian market. Cineplex Odeon and Famous Players were two dominant forces in the Canadian film industry, with both organizations accounting for roughly two-thirds of the industry's annual revenues. The key to the success of the two organizations was in large part due to their supply chain. Cineplex Odeon had exclusive first-run rights to films made by Columbia and Universal Studios, which allowed them to seize a hefty market share.

Controversy surrounded the practices of both Cineplex Odeon and Famous Players in 1998. The two companies had been accused of operating as a duopoly, and choking off the film supply so smaller theatres could not show the same products. Cineplex's control over the market allowed them to increase prices. They were criticized, including by Mayor Ed Koch, for raising ticket prices from USD5 to USD7 in New York City.

In April 1998, Cineplex Odeon Theatres merged with New York City-based Loews Theatres (founded in 1904 by Marcus Loew) to form Loews Cineplex Entertainment. Alliance Atlantis purchased Cineplex Odeon Films assets along with its home video division the same year.

=== Post Loews Cineplex Entertainment ===
After the merger, the company ceased to exist and was merged into the operations of Loews Cineplex Entertainment. In 1999, Ellis Jacob and Steve Brown, former executives who left Cineplex Odeon Corporation during the ownership change, created Galaxy Entertainment designed to bring big-city entertainment to mid-sized markets across Canada. In 2001, Loews Cineplex Entertainment, the company that merged with Cineplex Odeon, filed for chapter 11 bankruptcy. Lowes Cineplex was later acquired by Onex Corporation and Oaktree Capital Management in 2002. In 2004, Onex decided to sell Loews Cineplex and retain the Canadian operations, merging them with Galaxy to form the Cineplex Galaxy Income Fund (now Cineplex Entertainment). At the time of the merger, Cineplex Odeon operated 40 locations in Canada.

Cineplex Galaxy bought Famous Players for $500 million in June 2005.

== Gallery ==
The logo used by Odeon Theatres of Canada, the same logo used by its British parent company, Odeon Theatres

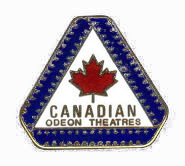
The logo of Canadian Odeon Theatres

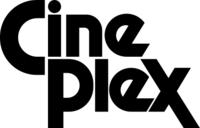
The logo of the Cineplex Corporation

The logo of the Cineplex Odeon (1984–1998)

The logo of the Cineplex Odeon (1999–2009)

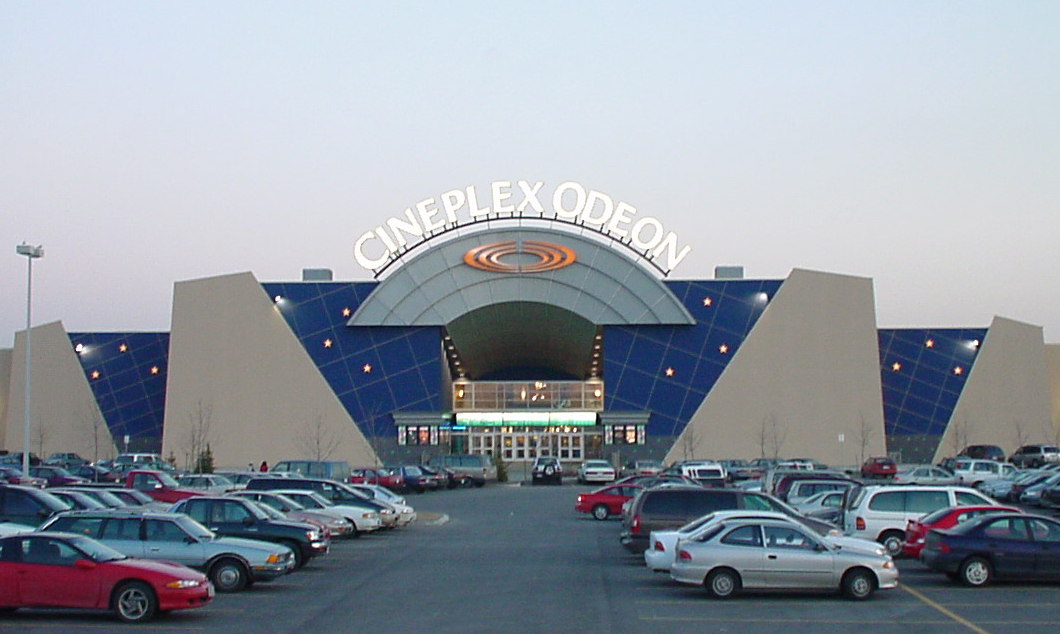
The Cineplex Odeon at Eglinton Town Centre in Toronto

== See also ==
- List of Cineplex Entertainment movie theatres

== Works cited ==
- Knelman, Martin (1987). Home Movies: Tales from the Canadian Film World. Key Porter Books. ISBN 1550130498.
- Pendakur, Manjunath (1990). Canadian Dreams & American Control: The Political Economy of the Canadian Film Industry. Garamond Press. ISBN 0920059937.
- Seiler, Robert (2013). Reel Time: Movie Exhibitors and Movie Audiences In Prairie Canada, 1896 to 1986. Athabasca University Press. ISBN 9781926836997.
