= Wednesdays in Mississippi =

American civil rights activist group

Wednesdays in Mississippi was an activist group during the Civil Rights Movement in the United States during the 1960s. Northern women of different races and faiths traveled to Mississippi to develop relationships with their southern peers and to create bridges of understanding across regional, racial, and class lines. By opening communications across societal boundaries, Wednesday's Women sought to end violence and to cushion the transition towards racial integration.

== Background ==
In the spring of 1964 Dorothy I. Height, President of the National Council of Negro Women (NCNW), working with NCNW volunteer Polly Spiegel Cowan, came up with the idea of sending weekly teams of northern women to Mississippi.

The teams were interracial and interfaith. They would leave for Mississippi on a Tuesday and return on a Thursday. They were there all day on Wednesday, the program was known as "Wednesdays in Mississippi." Competent, well connected, and educated, these women worked with Freedom Summer and the Freedom Schools.

In 1964, Height and Cowan brought Doris Wilson and Susie Goodwillie into Wednesdays in Mississippi to direct the project from Jackson, Mississippi.

The black women from the north visited with black women from the south; the white women from the north reached out to white women in the south. The women from the north went home with a fresh commitment to social and racial justice. In 1965 they came again, this time on a more professional level, speaking teacher to teacher and social worker to social worker.

In 1966 Wednesdays in Mississippi became Workshops in Mississippi, an ongoing effort to help black women and families, and poor white women and families, achieve economic self-betterment.

In 2020, the National Trust for Historic Preservation named the Sun'n'Sands Motel in Jackson as one of America's most endangered historic places, because of its connection to the Wednesdays in Mississippi movement.

== Goals ==
The women of Wednesdays in Mississippi had many goals:

- racial justice;
- inter-racial, inter-regional, and inter-faith communications;
- working across racial and religious boundaries, opening the closed society of Mississippi;
- supporting the freedom schools and voter registration;
- helping poor women in Mississippi learn how to help themselves, how to achieve economic self-sufficiency. They taught poor women how to survive in a society where the cotton economy had collapsed for poor tenants and laborers, and where a viable new economic structure not yet developed;
- and expanding the horizons and commitments of the northern women.

== Collections ==
Archival records related to Wednesdays in Mississippi reside at the Albert and Shirley Small Special Collections Library at the University of Virginia as well as at the National Archives for Black Women's History.
