= Marcus M. Spiegel =

German-American military officer

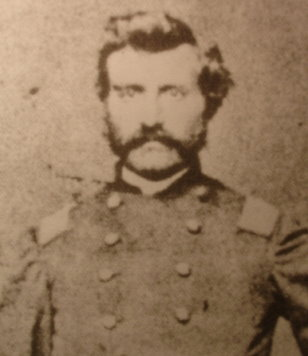
- Born: December 8, 1829; Abenheim, Germany
- Died: May 4, 1864 (aged 34); Louisiana, U.S.
- Occupation: U.S. Army officer
- Title: Colonel
- Relatives: Joseph Spiegel (brother)

Marcus M. Spiegel (December 8, 1829 – May 4, 1864) was one of the highest ranking Jewish officers in the U.S. Army during the American Civil War. He served in the 67th and 120th Ohio Volunteer Infantry. During the course of the war he became a staunch abolitionist. He served at the Siege of Vicksburg, and was mortally wounded during the Red River Campaign in May 1864.

== Early life and education ==
Spiegel was born in the hamlet of Abenheim, Germany, near the city of Worms, on December 8, 1829, to a Jewish family that had lived in Germany since the sixteenth century. While peddling in Ohio he met Caroline Hamlin, daughter of a prominent Quaker. They married and moved to Chicago, Illinois where she studied Judaism and German-Jewish cooking. She converted to Judaism in 1853 in Chicago. He was the older brother of Joseph Spiegel, founder of Spiegel Catalog.

== Career ==
Spiegel volunteered for the Union Army and soon rose through its ranks. He wrote over 150 letters to his wife Caroline during the course of the war, most of which still survive. In one of his letters wrote:

I am [in] favor of doing away with the institution of Slavery...never hereafter will I either speak or vote in favor of Slavery; this is no hasty conclusion but a deep conviction.

In late 1862 Spiegel was transferred to the recently formed 120th Ohio Volunteer infantry, and was promoted to lieutenant colonel. He was officially commissioned colonel on March 20, 1863, and took formal command of the regiment.

He served at the Battle of Vicksburg (May 18 – July 4, 1863). Soon after the fall of Vicksburg, he was badly wounded by an exploding shell. Spiegel survived the incident and was sent home to recuperate, and in March 1864 he returned to front line duties. Several weeks after his return, Confederate forces succeeded in ambushing the Union transport ship City Belle, at a location near Snaggy Point on the Red River, during the Red River Campaign in Louisiana. The result of the ambush was a disaster for the Ohioans; most of the 120th infantry were taken prisoner. Spiegel was again wounded by a shell burst; this time fatally. He died of his wounds on May 4, 1864.
