= Spiegel (retailer) =

Former direct marketing retailer

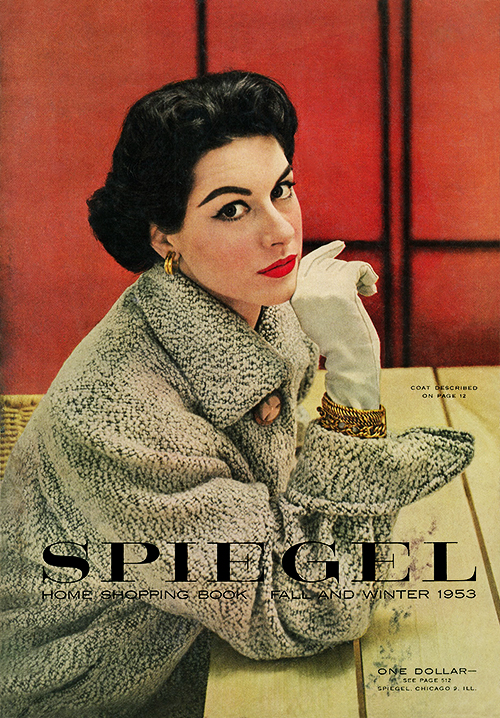
- Type: Private
- Industry: Clothing, home accessories
- Founded: 1865; 161 years ago
- Founder: Joseph Spiegel
- Defunct: 2019; 7 years ago
- Fate: Bankruptcy in 2003; Ceased operations in 2019
- Headquarters: Chicago, Illinois, U.S. 60609
- Area served: International
- Key people: Henery Johnson, Richard Lowe
- Brands: Spiegel, Brooklure, Newport News, Shape FX, Old Kraftsman, Eddie Bauer
- Owner: Patriarch Partners, LLC
- Website: Archive of website

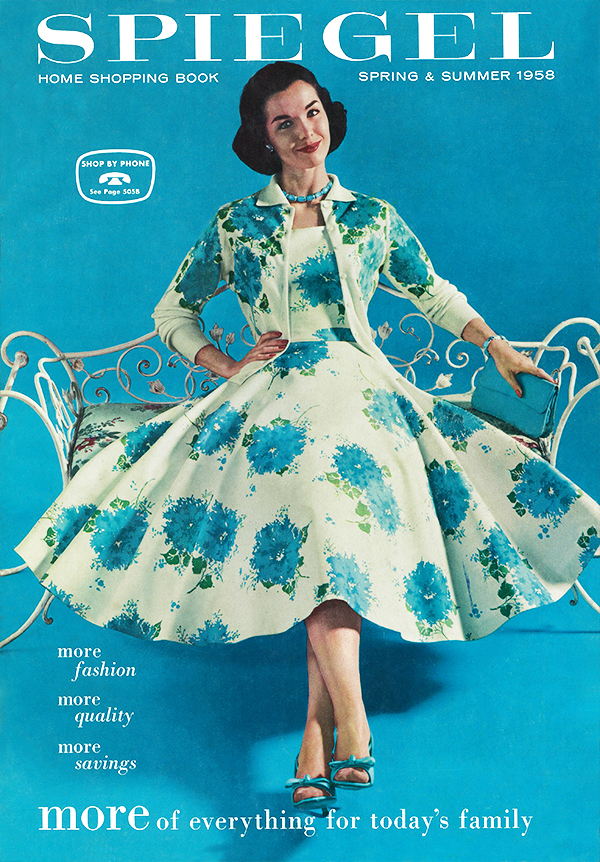
Spiegel Spring/Summer 1958 Catalog

Spiegel was an American direct marketing retailer founded in 1865 by Joseph Spiegel. Spiegel published a catalog, like its competitors Sears, Aldens, and Montgomery Ward, which advertised various brands of apparel, accessories, and footwear, as well as housewares, toys, tools, firearms, and electronics. Their company brands included Newport News, Shape FX, and Old Kraftsman, among others. They also operated brick-and-mortar stores.

Spiegel delivered its first mail order catalog in 1905 and by 1925, the retailer had 10 million customers. Spiegel's buyers, who went to Paris fashion shows, introduced American women to European fashion trends.

After encountering financial difficulty in the early 2000s, the company was purchased by Patriarch Partners and focused on women's style and fashion products. The catalog was eventually discontinued in favor of digital marketing. In 2019, the company website was removed without notice and the company ceased to operate.

== History ==
=== Early years ===
For the first 100 years of its history, Spiegel was primarily a family business. The company was founded in 1865 by German-Jewish entrepreneur Joseph Spiegel, the son of a German rabbi and younger brother of Union Army Colonel Marcus M. Spiegel. After spending the final few months of the Civil War in a Confederate prison camp, Joseph Spiegel settled in Chicago, where his brother-in-law, Henry Liebenstein, ran a furniture business. With Liebenstein's assistance, Joseph Spiegel opened J. Spiegel and Company, a small home furnishings retail operation located on Wabash Avenue in Chicago's loop.

In 1871, however, the Great Chicago Fire destroyed most of the area's business district, including the Spiegel store. After the fire, Joseph Spiegel and a partner named Jacob Cahn rebuilt the business, and by 1874 the company was prospering again under the leadership of the two men. Cahn retired from the business in 1879. In 1885 Spiegel began running regular advertisements in several Chicago newspapers, and the following year the company moved to a larger building on State Street. Joseph Spiegel's two oldest sons, Modie Spiegel and Sidney Spiegel, were brought into the business during this time.

Spiegel issued its first catalogs in 1888. The catalogs were made available to potential customers who lived outside the city. Because a mail order system did not yet exist, the catalogs served instead to lure people into the downtown store. By 1892, however, the business had taken a turn for the worse, as many customers were slow to pay for their purchases. With debts mounting, the company went bankrupt. At Modie Spiegel's urging, the company reinvented itself as Spiegel House Furnishings Company of Chicago in 1893. The principal difference was that the new company, like many others in the furniture business, sold on credit. The decision to offer installment plans, and the timing of the decision, made possible Spiegel's expansion over the next several decades.

=== Expansion in the early 1900s ===
The new Spiegel was more successful, and in 1898 a branch store was opened on Chicago's South Side. Another South Side branch went into operation three years later. The company's slogan—"We Trust the People!"—reflected its emphasis on credit merchandising. In 1903, Joseph Spiegel's third son, Arthur, entered the business with a plan to develop mail-order operations for Spiegel. After a couple of years of lobbying, Arthur convinced the company hierarchy to open a mail-order department, and in 1905, Spiegel became the first company to offer credit through the mail. The new service was reflected by the addition of a word to the company motto, which began to read: "We Trust the People—Everywhere!" This and the fact they did not charge interest on extended credit helped increase their business substantially.

In 1906, Spiegel's mail-order sales were near $1 million. To handle the success of the mail order operation, a new company—Spiegel, May, Stern, and Company—was formed, allowing the Spiegel House Furnishings Company to devote its limited resources to conventional retailing, rather than assume the debts associated with building up the mail order segment. Arthur was named president of the new company. In 1909, Spiegel introduced the teddy bear to the American consumer, for the first time nationwide, by offering it in its mail-order catalog. The Ideal Toy Company partnered with Spiegel to launch this successful toy venture, and Spiegel for many years gave its employees teddy bears to mark the company's anniversary.

Spiegel began to diversify its line of products after 1910, offering apparel for the first time in 1912. After a couple of unsuccessful partnerships with independent clothing manufacturers, Spiegel, May, Stern and Company began offering its own line of women's apparel. The "Martha Lane Adams" line—named after its fictional designer—was so successful that it quickly became a wholly owned subsidiary of Spiegel, May, Stern, and Company and earned its own catalog. Martha Lane Adams' sales grew to nearly $2 million by 1916. That same year, Arthur Spiegel died of pneumonia at age 32.

In 1926, company executive Ed Swikard introduced a promotional idea involving Congoleum floor covering. Swikard engineered a mailing to more than nine million residences, offering a pre-cut Congoleum package at a low cost. Customer response was such that company sales reached a record $16 million for the year, with a net profit of $4 million. In 1928, Spiegel, May, Stern and Company went public, and although the Spiegel family retained a controlling interest, Spiegel stock prices reached $118 per share in 1928.

=== Great Depression ===
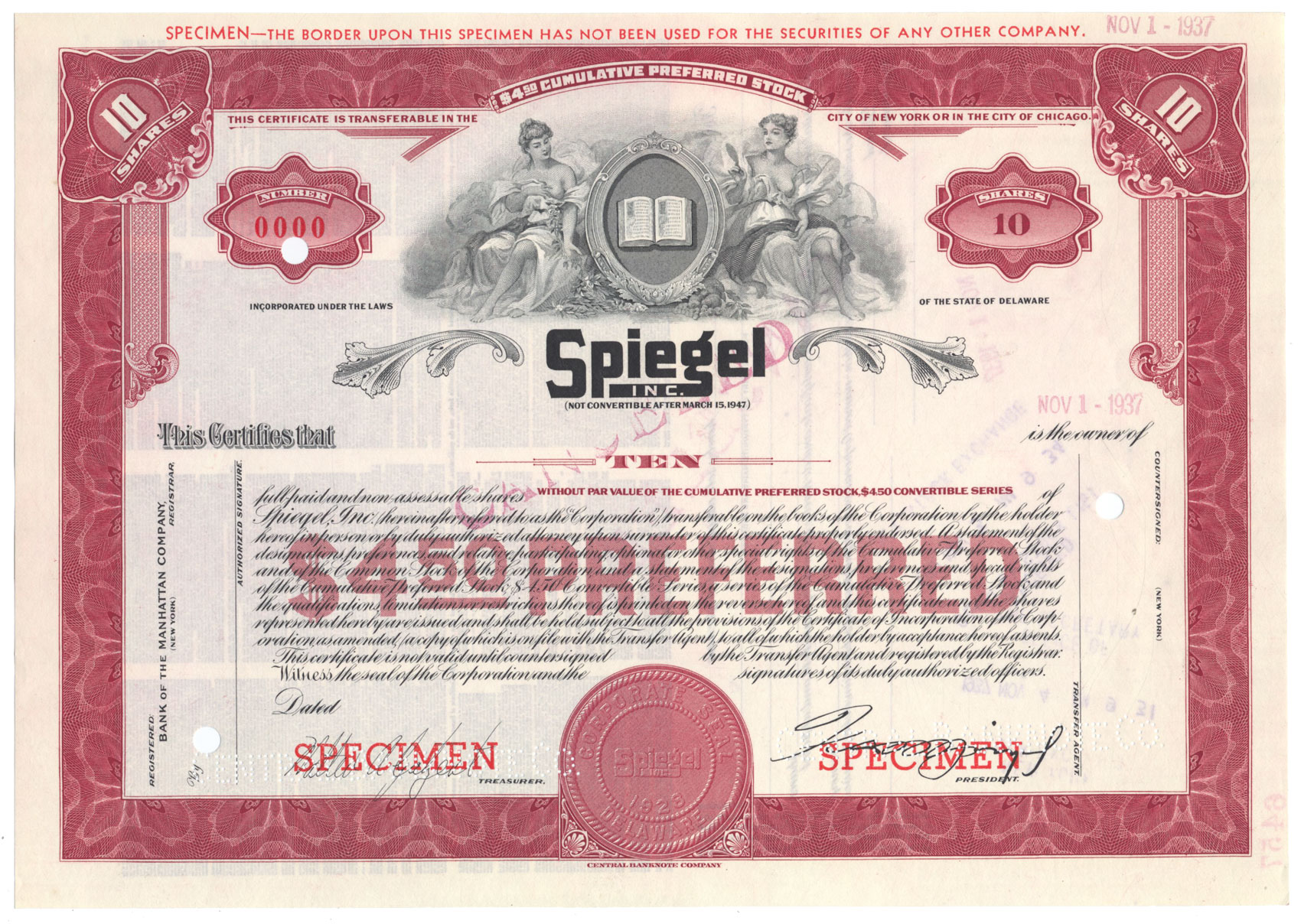
A specimen stock certificate from Spiegel, Inc. dating back to the 1930s

The Great Depression hurt Spiegel's business. In 1930, Spiegel's stock dropped to seven cents per share. The following year, the Spiegel family began gradually liquidating their retail furniture business. By 1932, the last Spiegel furniture store in Chicago closed its doors.

After experiencing considerable economic losses in the early years of the Depression, Spiegel entered a period of growth and profits beginning in 1933. During this time, M. J. Spiegel, son of Modie, took over the leadership of the company. Spurred again by the company's aggressive marketing of their "easy credit without interest" policy, sales rose from $7.1 million in 1932 to more than $56 million by 1937. Furthermore, a $300,000 net loss was transformed into $2.5 million in profits. When sales began to plateau in 1938, Spiegel shifted attention to consumers in a higher income bracket. The company began adding popular brand names with national reputations to its catalog.

=== World War II and 1950s ===
The onset of World War II was financially disastrous for Spiegel. As much domestic manufacturing had shifted to wartime production, many of their popular catalog products were no longer available in significant quantities. A labor shortage also affected the company's operations, and when the U.S. government discouraged buying on credit, Spiegel management had to discard its popular "No Charge for Credit" policy. In 1942 and 1943 combined, the company lost $3.8 million. In 1944, in hopes of reversing the trend, Spiegel began to open retail outlets once again, hoping to mimic the success of Sears, Roebuck & Co., and Montgomery Ward. The same year, Spiegel also acquired 46 Sally dress shops in Illinois and several other regional chains were purchased over the next few years. By 1948, Spiegel was operating 168 retail stores featuring a wide range of merchandise, including clothing, furniture, electronics, housewares, and auto supplies.

After initial success in brick-and-mortar retail, the costs of retail operations began to outweigh the benefits. By the mid-1950s, Spiegel was again focusing on mail-order sales on credit. Although nearly all of the company's retail outlets were sold off by 1954, several catalog shopping centers were retained so that customers could ask questions and place orders in person with company representatives. The following year, Spiegel unveiled its Budget Power Plan, a liberal policy under which customers were offered a line of credit sometimes as high as $1,000, with very low monthly payments. The idea was to add as many names as possible to the Spiegel customer list. The company also widely expanded its range of products offered in the catalogs, including outdoor power equipment such as mowers and tillers, personal watercraft under the name Brooklure, and musical instruments using the Old Kraftsman name.

=== 1960s and 1970s ===
By 1960, sales greater than $200 million and nearly two million people held Spiegel credit accounts. In addition, Spiegel began selling pets. In 1965, after a century of operation as a family business, Spiegel was purchased by Beneficial Finance Company. Spiegel stockholders received shares of Beneficial stock, and Spiegel became a wholly owned subsidiary of Beneficial.

Spiegel benefited from television exposure and advertising in the form of prizes given away on several game shows, most notably The Hollywood Squares, The Price Is Right, and Let's Make a Deal. Announcers emphasized Spiegel's large catalog offerings in on-air promotional announcements and included Spiegel's Chicago zip code, 60609. Often these programs would award contestants gift certificates of a certain dollar amount toward catalog items, giving winners the flexibility to choose their own prize.

During the early 1970s, several charges were leveled against Spiegel by the U.S. Federal Trade Commission regarding some of the company's marketing tactics. In 1971, the FTC accused Spiegel of failing to adequately disclose credit terms in some of its statements and catalog ads. The company also was cited for its handling of credit life insurance policies, as well as for offering free home trials without informing customers that credit approval was required before a product would be shipped. Moreover, in 1974, the FTC charged that Spiegel's debt collection policies treated customers unfairly. Most of the complaints brought by the FTC during this period were settled by changes in company practices, and serious action by the government was generally avoided.

Rising interest rates in the mid-1970s made financing credit accounts costly. Also during that time, Spiegel began encountering significant competition from discount stores such as Kmart, which were rapidly establishing a national presence. In 1976, to help turn the company around, Beneficial hired Henry "Hank" Johnson, a veteran of the mail order operations of Montgomery Ward and Avon. One of Johnson's first moves was to streamline company management. Dozens of executives were fired, and overall employment numbers were reduced by half over the next five years, from 7,000 in 1976 to 3,500 in 1981. Johnson also closed Spiegel's remaining catalog stores.

Johnson changed Spiegel's image to that of a "fine department store in print." Accordingly, the Spiegel catalog was completely revamped; low-budget items were replaced by upscale apparel and accessories for career women. Merchandise bearing designer labels began appearing in 1980, when the company introduced a line of Gloria Vanderbilt products.

=== New direction in the 1980s ===
Catalog sales in general boomed during the early 1980s. Spiegel's sales began to grow 25 to 30 percent a year. Although Spiegel still ranked fourth in catalog sales during this time, trailing Sears, JCPenney, and Montgomery Ward, the company's strategies were being followed closely by its larger competitors.

In 1982, Beneficial sold Spiegel to Otto-Versand GmbH, a large, private West German company prominent in catalog sales. Between 1982 and 1983, Spiegel's revenue increased from $394 million to $513 million, and the company's pre-tax profits more than doubled, reaching $22.5 million in 1983. The following year, control of Spiegel was transferred from Otto-Versand itself to members of its controlling family, the Ottos. Under new ownership, Spiegel's transformation into an outlet for higher-end products continued.

In 1984, Spiegel began distributing specialty catalogs in addition to its four primary catalogs; 25 of these specialty catalogs were in circulation by 1986, featuring Italian imports, plus-sized clothing, and other specialty items. That year, Spiegel mailed a total of 130 million catalogs, for $100 million, and company sales surpassed the $1 billion mark for the first time.

In 1987, six million shares of nonvoting stock were sold to the public, marking the first time since 1965 that Spiegel was not completely privately held. In 1988, Spiegel acquired Eddie Bauer, Inc., a retail chain specializing in sportswear and outdoor equipment from General Mills. Eddie Bauer, which also maintained a catalog operation, had annual sales of $260 million. In the first year following the acquisition, the chain was expanded from 60 to 99 stores.

By 1989, Spiegel had become the number three catalog retailer in the United States, with a total circulation of about 200 million catalogs, including 60 different specialty catalogs, and an active customer base of five million.

=== New additions in the early 1990s ===
In 1990, Spiegel acquired First Consumers National Bank (FCNB), which began issuing credit cards and statements to Spiegel and Eddie Bauer customers. That year, the company engaged in an aggressive advertising campaign for career women featuring actress Candice Bergen, who portrayed a career woman on the popular situation comedy "Murphy Brown." The campaign also featured a specialty catalog promoted by Bergen, emphasizing the inconvenience of department store shopping and the relative ease of shopping by catalog.

The company began to expand its retail outlet operations based on lines from its catalogs. Spiegel stores included "For You From Spiegel," which offered plus-sized women's apparel, and Crayola Kids, providing a line of children's apparel first launched in 1991. Despite these innovations, the company's growth stagnated due to the national economic recession, and earnings declined sharply in 1991. Slight gains were realized the following year as Spiegel's revenue topped $2 billion. Eddie Bauer performed particularly well, having grown to 265 stores.

In August 1993, Spiegel announced its purchase of Newport News (formerly Avon Fashions), a catalog company specializing in moderately-priced women's clothing. Later that year, Spiegel published a new specialty catalog, E Style, a partnership between Spiegel and Ebony magazine featuring a clothing line aimed at African-American women. The same year, Sears discontinued its catalog sales operation and Spiegel and other specialty catalog retailers moved quickly to assume the leadership role and increase their share of the market.

Spiegel reported total revenues of $2.6 billion in 1993. Sales at Eddie Bauer stores reached $1 billion that year, bolstered by 30 new locations. Between Spiegel and Eddie Bauer, 81 different catalogs, with a total circulation of more than 313 million, were distributed in 1993. The company's specialty retail stores also performed well in 1993, generating $840 million in sales.

=== Innovations in the mid-1990s ===
In 1994, Spiegel formed a joint venture with Time Warner Entertainment to create two home shopping services for cable television. One of the services was named "Catalog 1," and was planned as a one-channel showcase for a roster of numerous upscale catalog retailers, each of which would sell its goods using innovative entertainment-style shows. Participants in Catalog 1 in 1994, besides Spiegel and Eddie Bauer were The Bombay Company, Crate & Barrel, The Nature Company, Neiman Marcus, The Sharper Image, Viewer's Edge, and Williams Sonoma. The channel was tested in five markets that year: Rochester, New York; Milwaukee, Wisconsin; Nashua, New Hampshire; Columbus, Ohio; and Pittsburgh, Pennsylvania.

Spiegel also teamed up with Lillian Vernon, Lands' End, and other catalogers in 1994 to create a CD-ROM catalog. The company formed a partnership with MCI Communications Corporation that was aimed at increasing both companies' customer bases. MCI began offering a $35 Spiegel gift certificate to any customer who changed their long-distance telephone service to MCI. MCI also offered an additional $20 certificate to any customer who remained an MCI user for at least six months. Around this time, Spiegel considered entering the electronic shopping market through an online service such as America Online. This was realized in 1995 but at the expense of the year-old Catalog 1 venture. By this time, Catalog 1 had begun airing in three more test markets, raising its total presence to eight cities. Time Warner and Spiegel decided, however, there was a greater potential gain in launching a website for Catalog 1 and capitalizing on the increasing popularity of the Internet. Accordingly, they scaled back their cable television operation and began working on a home page through Time Warner's popular Pathfinder site.

Spiegel also initiated an entrance into the Canadian market in 1995 and planned to distribute its catalog there by the spring of 1996. Previous strong Eddie Bauer business in Canada aided the company's decision to move in on a larger scale, as did the company's good distribution agreements in Canada. Eddie Bauer was also performing well in Japan, where the company had built many retail stores throughout the previous few years.

The year 1996 marked the most profitable year in Eddie Bauer's history, and Spiegel's revenues benefited. Eddie Bauer's merchandise was popular enough that the company encountered issues with out-of-stock merchandise occurrences—a direct result of high consumer demand. Eddie Bauer also made headlines in 1996 when it introduced "Balance Day" to its employees, which was an extra day off per year. The addition demonstrated the company's commitment to providing innovative benefits to its workers, and employees began referring to it as "call in well day." The company made an effort to find ways to offer its single workers benefits that were equal to those offered to its workers with families.

=== Late 1990s ===
Spiegel achieved $3.06 billion in 1997 revenue, with approximately $1.8 billion of that stemming from its Eddie Bauer operations. Regardless of Eddie Bauer's contribution to its parent company, however, the subsidiary had a difficult fiscal year. Following the increase in demand for its products in 1996, the company overproduced and overstocked in 1997. In addition, the newer Eddie Bauer merchandise offerings were not as popular as the prior year's; thus the company was left with an oversupply of merchandise. In the August 17, 1998 issue of the Puget Sound Business Journal, Eddie Bauer's president and CEO, Rick Fersch, commented on the company's problems: "We were overplanned, overstocked, overstyled, overcolored—and it was over warm (last winter) and that meant trouble."

The year 1998 brought additional challenges for Eddie Bauer and, subsequently, for Bauer's parent company. Warmer than usual winter weather, brought about by a highly publicized weather phenomenon known as El Nino, once again hurt Bauer's sales figures. Spiegel's overall revenues for the year dropped to $2.94 billion as a result.

Spiegel set out to halt its downward spiral and achieve profitability again. The company redesigned its main catalog, which in prior years had become something of an amalgam of differing—and often conflicting—items and images. The company created a catalog solely to target the working woman and organized its main catalog so as not to place $1,000 designer outfits adjacent to $20 casual shirts, for example. Eddie Bauer also launched efforts to get itself back on track.

By the end of the year, Spiegel announced they had improved earnings. Although its revenue decreased during 1998, the company turned a profit and achieved positive cash flow, according to a fiscal year-end document released by Spiegel in early 1999. Eddie Bauer's performance disappointed again during the year, but Spiegel's other subsidiary catalog, Newport News, posted solid results.

=== 2000–2019 ===
After years of shrinking economic fortunes, the company suffered large financial losses and changed ownership three times within the early 2000s. In 2003, Spiegel filed for bankruptcy and reorganization under the bankruptcy code. This included closing 60 Eddie Bauer stores. The following year, a group headed by Golden Gate Capital Partners and Pangea Holdings Ltd., purchased the Spiegel and Newport News catalog businesses. At the same time, the existing, reorganizing company retained its Eddie Bauer unit and eventually assumed the subsidiary name as the company name. From 2004, the Spiegel catalog and the women's fashion catalog Newport News operated under the name Spiegel Brands, Inc.

In 2008, Spiegel was sold again to an investment group led by Granite Creek Partners. In June 2009, Spiegel was sold again to private equity fund Patriarch Partners, LLC, and then operated under the name Spiegel LLC, having done business from 2009 to 2012 as Signature Styles, LLC and Artemiss LLC respectively. Spiegel's headquarters were then moved to New York City from Chicago. In 2012, the leadership at Spiegel was replaced when the company discontinued its print catalog in favor of digital marketing.

In 2016, Spiegel announced it would become the first American fashion digital catalog to feature a transgender model on its cover when Arisce Wanzer was selected. At the same time, some other Patriarch Partner companies had begun abruptly shutting down without notice. Several lawsuits were ultimately filed against Patriarch and civil-fraud allegations were leveled by the U.S. Securities and Exchange Commission.

Ultimately, during the winter of 2019–2020, Spiegel's website was removed and the company abruptly ceased operations.
