= Brad Schneider =

American politician (born 1961)

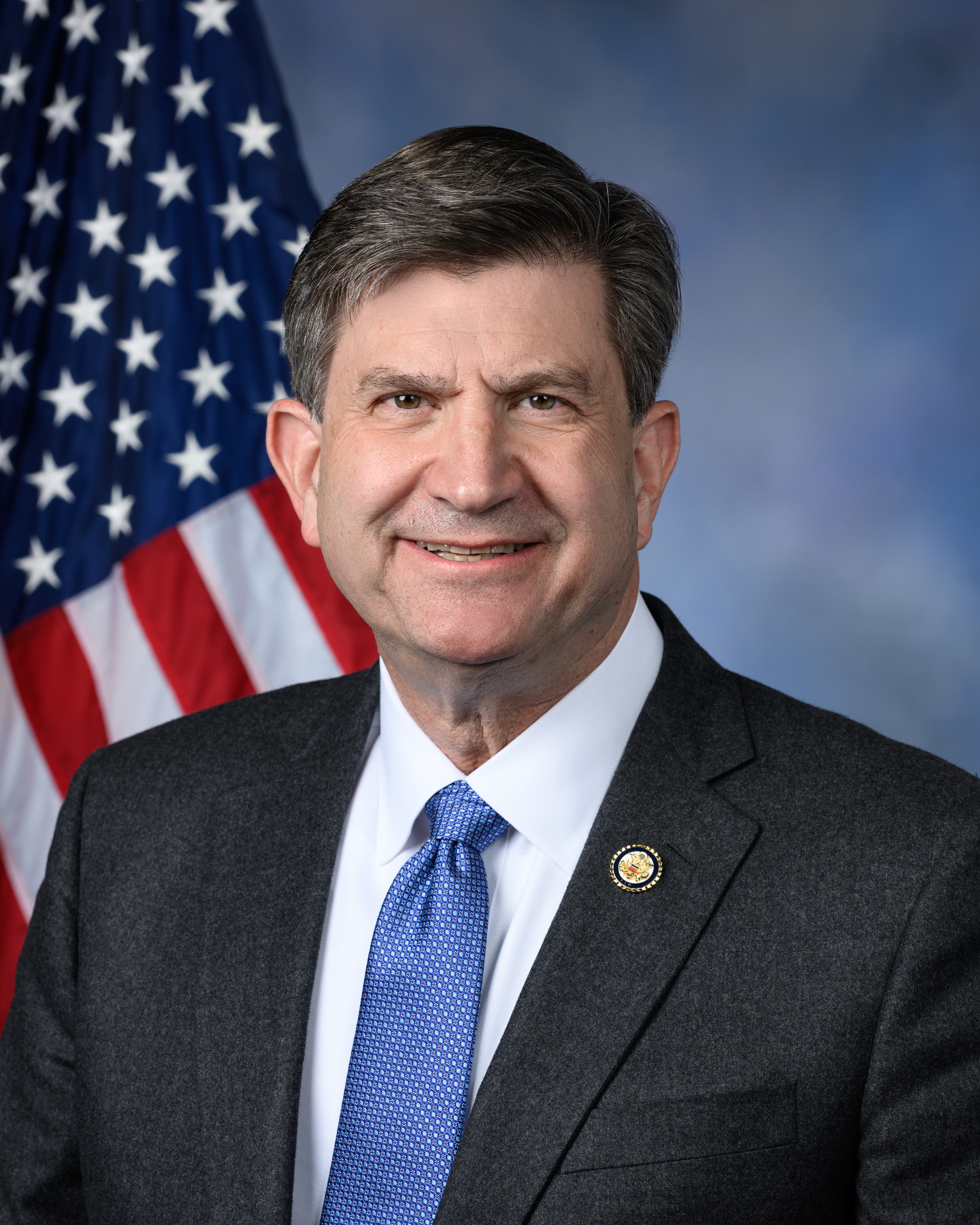
- Official portrait, 2025

Chair of the New Democrat Coalition
- Incumbent
- Assumed office January 3, 2025
- Preceded by: Annie Kuster

Member of the U.S. House of Representatives from Illinois's 10th district
- Incumbent
- Assumed office January 3, 2017
- Preceded by: Bob Dold
- In office January 3, 2013 – January 3, 2015
- Preceded by: Bob Dold
- Succeeded by: Bob Dold

Personal details
- Born: Bradley Scott Schneider; August 20, 1961 (age 65) Denver, Colorado, U.S.
- Party: Democratic
- Spouse: Julie Dann (m. 1989)
- Children: 2
- Relatives: Aaron Regunberg (nephew)
- Education: Northwestern University (BS, MBA)
- Website: House website Campaign website

Bradley Scott Schneider (born August 20, 1961) is an American businessman and politician who has served as the U.S. representative for Illinois's 10th congressional district since 2017 and previously from 2013 to 2015. The district is dominated by the northern suburbs of Chicago along Lake Michigan. He is a member of the Democratic Party.

Schneider was first elected in 2012, narrowly defeating Republican incumbent Bob Dold. In 2014, he lost his bid for reelection to Dold. Defeating Dold again in their 2016 rematch, Schneider has since been reelected four times by comfortable margins. He has been the chair of the New Democrat Coalition, the largest House Democratic ideological caucus, since 2025.

== Early life, education and career ==
Schneider was born on August 20, 1961, in Denver, Colorado, where he graduated from Cherry Creek High School. In 1983, after receiving a Bachelor of Science in industrial engineering from Northwestern University, Schneider worked on a kibbutz in Israel. He later returned to the Chicago area to receive a Master of Business Administration from Northwestern's Kellogg School of Management in 1988, and worked for the consulting firm PriceWaterhouseCoopers.

Schneider worked as the managing principal of the life insurance firm Davis Dann Adler Schneider, LLC, from 1997 until 2003, when he became the director of the strategic services group at Blackman Kallick. In 2008, he started his own consulting company, Cadence Consulting Group.

== U.S House of Representatives ==
=== Elections ===
==== 2012 ====
Schneider defeated Ilya Sheyman, John Tree, and Vivek Bavda in the Democratic primary election on March 20, 2012, with 47% of the vote. He faced incumbent Republican Robert Dold in the November 6 general election. The nonpartisan Rothenberg Political Report declared the 10th district election "Leans Democrat" while Roll Call categorized the race as a toss-up. The Democratic Congressional Campaign Committee placed significant focus on the race as part of their Red to Blue Program. Schneider defeated Dold by 3,326 votes, 51%-49%.

==== 2014 ====
Schneider ran for reelection. Dold was again the Republican nominee. As of July 2014, Schneider's campaign had $1.9 million cash on hand and Dold's $1.65 million. Schneider was a member of the Democratic Congressional Campaign Committee's Frontline program, a program designed to protect the most vulnerable Democratic incumbents.

Schneider was endorsed by the League of Conservation Voters and Planned Parenthood.

Dold won the election.

==== 2016 ====
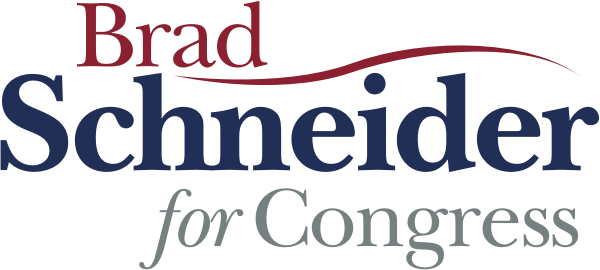
2016 campaign logo

In March 2016, Schneider won the Democratic nomination for the 10th district seat, defeating Nancy Rotering, the mayor of Highland Park. Dold ran for reelection. Schneider defeated Dold by 13,916 votes, 53% to 47%.

==== 2018 ====
Schneider ran for reelection. He was unopposed in the Democratic primary election. Dold did not run again; business consultant Douglas Bennett narrowly won the Republican nomination against doctor Sapan Shah and attorney Jeremy Wynes. Parting ways with the district's reputation as a swing district, that year it was considered "Solid Democrat." Schneider was reelected.

== Political positions ==
Schneider campaigned as a moderate Democrat, and often described himself as a progressive. He has described himself as "pragmatic and a moderate."

Schneider voted with President Joe Biden's stated position 100% of the time in the 117th Congress, according to a FiveThirtyEight analysis.

=== Abortion ===
Schneider has said he is "100 percent pro-choice", and has been endorsed by Planned Parenthood and NARAL Pro-Choice America. He co-sponsored a bill to reverse the impact of the Supreme Court's ruling in Burwell v. Hobby Lobby and require employers to offer "a full range" of contraceptive options.

=== Environment ===
Schneider supports EPA carbon emission standards for power plants. In his 2012 primary race, he supported emissions trading, incentives for businesses to develop alternative energy systems, and tax credits for individuals to implement sustainable and renewable energy improvements in their homes.

=== Foreign policy ===
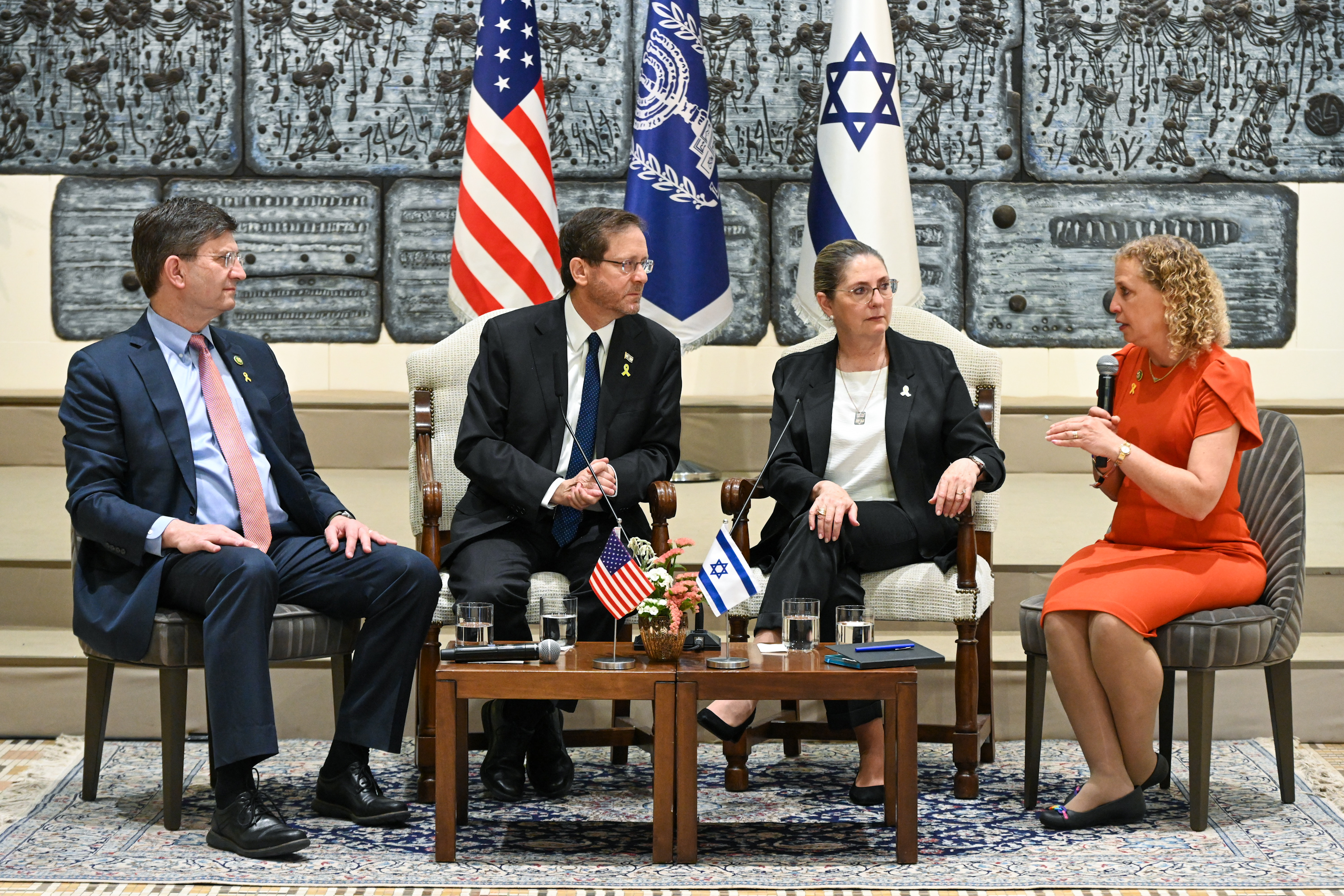
Schneider and Debbie Wasserman Schultz with Israeli President Isaac Herzog in Jerusalem, Israel, March 28, 2024

Schneider supports "broad and deep" sanctions on Iran and covert operations to dissuade Iran from its nuclear weapons program, as well as its sales to terrorist organizations. He is a longtime member of the pro-Israel lobby AIPAC. In July 2019, a House resolution was introduced by Schneider condemning the Global Boycott, Divestment and Sanctions (BDS) Movement targeting Israel. The resolution passed 398–17. Schneider has been described as "staunchly pro-Israel".

In February 2023, Schneider signed a letter advocating for President Biden to give F-16 fighter jets to Ukraine.

=== Guns ===
In March 2021, Schneider and Representative Adriano Espaillat proposed legislation to regulate homemade firearms. This was pitched as an effort to curb gun violence.

=== Health care ===
Schneider supports the Patient Protection and Affordable Care Act signed into law by President Obama, and opposes repeal. He voted for a bill to increase enrollment transparency. He opposes and has criticized Medicare for All.

=== LGBT issues ===
Schneider supports same-sex marriage and criticized the Trump Administration's ban on transgender military service members. He supports the Equality Act and introduced the Fair and Equal Housing Act of 2025 with Rep. Fitzpatrick to expand the definition of housing discrimination to include “sexual orientation” and “gender identity.”

In 2022, Schneider voted for the Respect for Marriage Act.

=== Tax policy ===
In 2012 Schneider told the Chicago Tribune that he favors a 3:1 ratio of spending cuts to tax increases in order to reduce the debt. He said he is open to cuts in discretionary, defense, and entitlement spending. Schneider supported the repeal of the Bush tax cuts and "long-term, comprehensive tax reform" that includes higher taxes on high incomes.

In 2024 Schneider cosponsored HR Bill 9495 also known as the Stop Terror-Financing and Tax Penalties on American Hostages Act. This bill, if passed into law, would give the Treasury Secretary the power to designate any U.S. 501(c)(3) nonprofit entity as a “terrorist supporting organization” and immediately revoke that organization’s tax-exempt status. According to the Intercept, human rights groups broadly viewed the bill as a means to curb freedom of speech, specifically in relation to those advocating for the rights of Palestinians and against genocide.

=== Privacy ===
In 2013 Schneider voted against the Amash–Conyers Amendment, a bill "that would have stopped the surveillance programs of the NSA".

=== Minimum wage ===
Schneider co-sponsored a 2013 bill that would have raised the minimum wage to $10.10 an hour.

=== 2024 presidential nominee ===
On July 11, 2024, Schneider called for Joe Biden to withdraw from the 2024 United States presidential election.

=== Committee assignments ===
For the 119th Congress:

- Committee on Foreign Affairs
  - Subcommittee on Oversight and Accountability
- Committee on Ways and Means
  - Subcommittee on Tax
  - Subcommittee on Trade

=== Caucus memberships ===
- Congressional Equality Caucus
- Climate Solutions Caucus
- New Democrat Coalition
- Rare Disease Caucus

== Electoral history ==
Illinois 10th Congressional District Democratic Primary, 2012
Party	Candidate	Votes	%
Democratic	Brad Schneider	15,530	46.88
Democratic	Ilya Sheyman	12,767	38.54
Democratic	John Tree	2,938	8.87
Democratic	Vivek Bavda	1,881	5.68
Democratic	Aloys Rutagwibira	8	0.02
Total votes		33,124	100.0

Illinois 10th Congressional District General Election, 2012
Party	Candidate	Votes	%
Democratic	Brad Schneider	133,890	50.63
Republican	Robert Dold (incumbent)	130,564	49.37
Total votes		264,454	100.0

Illinois 10th Congressional District General Election, 2014
Party	Candidate	Votes	%
Republican	Robert Dold	95,992	51.30
Democratic	Brad Schneider (incumbent)	91,136	48.70
Total votes		187,128	100.0

Illinois 10th Congressional District Democratic Primary, 2016
Party	Candidate	Votes	%
Democratic	Brad Schneider	50,916	53.73
Democratic	Nancy Rotering	43,842	46.27
Total votes		94,758	100.0

Illinois 10th Congressional District General Election, 2016
Party	Candidate	Votes	%
Democratic	Brad Schneider	150,435	52.60
Republican	Robert Dold (incumbent)	135,535	47.39
Write-in votes	Joseph William Kopsick	26	0.01
Total votes		285,996	100.0

Illinois 10th Congressional District General Election, 2018
Party	Candidate	Votes	%
Democratic	Brad Schneider (incumbent)	156,540	65.59
Republican	Douglas R. Bennett	82,124	34.41
Total votes		238,664	100.0

Illinois 10th Congressional District General Election, 2020
Party	Candidate	Votes	%
Democratic	Brad Schneider (incumbent)	202,402	63.87
Republican	Valerie Ramirez Mukherjee	114,442	36.12
Independent	Joseph W. Kopsick	18	0.01
Independent	David Rych	12	0.01
Total votes		316,874	100.0

Illinois 10th Congressional District General Election, 2022
Party	Candidate	Votes	%
Democratic	Brad Schneider (incumbent)	152,566	63.00
Republican	Joseph Severino	89,599	37.00
Total votes		242,165	100.0

Illinois 10th Congressional District General Election, 2024
Party	Candidate	Votes	%
Democratic	Brad Schneider (incumbent)	196,358	59.93
Republican	Jim Carris	131,025	39.99
Write-in votes	Joseph Severino	238	0.07
Total votes		327,621	100.0

== Personal life ==
Schneider and his wife Julie live in Deerfield. They have two sons. His nephew, Aaron Regunberg, is a Democratic politician in Rhode Island.

In 2012, the Chicago Tribune noted that Schneider billed himself as a small businessman, though "he has taken on few paying ventures in recent years". In 2013, Roll Call reported that Schneider was the 35th-wealthiest member of Congress. He ranked as the 34th-wealthiest member of Congress in 2014. The same year, Schneider changed his filing status in what Crain's Chicago Business described as "an apparent effort to keep his wealthy wife's income private."

In 2013, as part of the Jewish United Fund of Metropolitan Chicago, Schneider led twenty-five people on a mission (his tenth with JUF) to Israel. He has also been involved with AIPAC and the Jewish Federation of Metropolitan Chicago.

Schneider tested positive for COVID-19 on January 12, 2021, after sheltering in place during the U.S. Capitol attack.

== See also ==
- List of Jewish members of the United States Congress

U.S. House of Representatives
Preceded by Bob Dold	Member of the U.S. House of Representatives from Illinois's 10th congressional district 2013–2015	Succeeded by Bob Dold
Preceded by Bob Dold	Member of the U.S. House of Representatives from Illinois's 10th congressional district 2017–present	Incumbent
Party political offices
Preceded by Annie Kuster	Chair of the New Democrat Coalition; 2025–present	Incumbent
U.S. order of precedence (ceremonial)
Preceded by Dwight Evans	United States representatives by seniority 153rd	Succeeded by David Valadao
