= Nannie Aschenheim Reis =

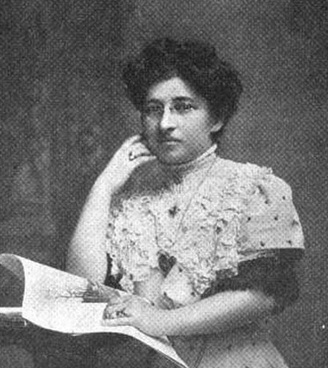
- Nannie A. Reis, from a 1910 publication.
- Born: December 28, 1871; Dresden, German Empire
- Died: October 14, 1940 (aged 68); Chicago, Illinois, U.S.
- Burial place: Mount Sinai Israel Cemetery, Chicago

Nannie Aschenheim Reis (December 28, 1871—October 14, 1940) was a newspaper columnist, clubwoman, and congregational leader in the Chicago Jewish community from approximately 1900 to 1940. She was a personal acquaintance of Jane Addams and worked closely with Hannah G. Solomon.

== Family and early life ==
Nannie Aschenheim was born in Dresden, Germany on December 28, 1871. Her parents were Adolph Aschenheim and Zerlina [Cohn] Aschenheim. She immigrated to Chicago with her family in 1883.

== Beliefs ==
According to Joe Kraus (writing in the sourcebook Women Building Chicago 1790—1990): Reis was “a firm believer in the principle that women should organize themselves for the betterment of society, she was active in a variety of clubs designed to help immigrants assimilate to the new world, aid strangers stranded in uncomfortable circumstances, assist the blind, and tap the political energies of women in general. As the women's clubs columnist with the English language Jewish newspaper the Reform Advocate for almost 3 decades, Reis was one of the most visible and articulate figures in a movement that saw women as essential actors and benefiting society.”

== Temple activities ==
Reis practiced Reform Judaism, and she was active on the congregational level. She served as president of the Temple Israel Ladies Society from 1904 to 1906, and then president of the B'nai Shalom Temple Israel Ladies Society from 1906 to 1911 after the two congregations merged.

The Rabbi of B'nai Sholom Temple Israel Congregation was Gerson Levi, son-in-law of Rabbi Emil G. Hirsch (the leader of Chicago Sinai Congregation and a nationally prominent leader of the Reform movement in America). Hirsch and Levi were publisher and assistant publisher, respectively, of the Reform Advocate (just called the Advocate after 1937), and through her association with Levi, Reis became a contributor in 1910.

== Writings ==
Her first piece, “The Woman and The Club”, appeared on May 21, 1910. In this article, Reis made broad use of the two meanings of the word club: the one used in prehistoric times to force women into submission, and the other a form of organization that allowed women to take an active role in society. She proposed that women in clubs were not only capable of making important contributions of the social debate, but that their combined strength in clubs would make them impossible to ignore. Therefore, she considered the club a central means by which modern woman could have her say in a world that habitually discounted women's thinking.

After a second article, a survey of the Jewish women's clubs, was published on May 31, 1913, she began to write regularly. By December 19, 1914, she had a regular column (“In the World of Jewish Womankind") which she continued writing until her death (although it was renamed “This, Our Day" sometime in the late 1930s).

According to Kraus: “While the topics of Reis's columns change to reflect the times in which she wrote, her subjects remained consistent. Throughout her years as a writer, she condemned racial and ethnic hatred and praised America as a place that could accommodate differences. In an article on August 16, 1919 she condemned the Chicago race riots; on December 26, 1925, she critiqued immigration education efforts; and on May 3, 1935, she condemned fascism and Bolshevism as antidemocratic. Shocked by the rise to power of Adolf Hitler in her homeland, Germany, she took the opportunity to praise an America that permitted strangers to assimilate to its mores and asked its women to lead the way.”

=== Quotes from columns ===
- May 1, 1915, “Let then the club who has graduated from Rousseau, Rossetti and Ruskin, and from ‘School extension’ or ‘Social service’ devote itself to creating and spreading an honest, intelligent public opinion."
- March 20, 1935: “The National Council of Jewish Women is continuing to effectuate itself by arousing the living interest of the young women of Jewry still retaining the time-worn and time-tried loyalty of the envisioned generation of the founder [Hannah G. Solomon] herself and that equally sturdy one in between these two."
- March 10, 1939: “In American life, it is the woman who determines the social standing of the family... Her family's social standing is determined by the sort of gentility she can stamp upon the family."

== Summary ==
Kraus's biographical entry concludes as follows: “In the course of her life, Reis crossed a number of borders and worked to open communication between the different worlds she knew firsthand. Born in Germany and yet fully at home in America, she translated not only German for English speakers but also described what it meant to come to a new country for those who had always been here. As a woman excluded from formal political participation for much of her adult life, she helped other women find alternate ways to shape society. At the same time she celebrated the power of women before an audience that also included men. She sought to understand immigrants and outsiders, and she sought to give voice to the women of her community. She used her considerable gifts as a writer and her service as a club woman to those ends.”

== Personal life and death ==
In 1895 she married Ignace J Reis, a Chicago chiropodist. The couple had two children. Ralph, the older of the two, became an obstetrician and gynecologist in Chicago, while Herbert died in late childhood following an accident.

Following the death of her husband in 1938, Reis moved in with her son and daughter-in-law. She continued her writing and club activities until two weeks before her death. Rabbi Charles Shulman of the North Shore Congregation Israel in Glencoe delivered the eulogy, and she was buried in Mount Sinai Israel Cemetery in Chicago.
