= CJE (disambiguation) =

CJE may refer to:

- Canadian Journal of Economics, a peer-reviewed academic journal of economics
- ISO 639:cje, the ISO 639 code for the Chru language
- CJE SeniorLife, a Jewish organization originally founded as the Council for Jewish Elderly
- Cje, a letter of the Cyrillic script
