= Lady Esther =

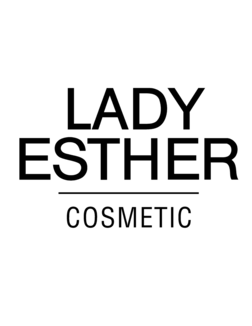
- Company type: Private
- Industry: Cosmetic manufacturing
- Founded: 1913
- Founder: Syma Cohen and her siblings
- Headquarters: Chicago, Illinois, US
- Area served: US/Germany
- Products: cosmetics
- Owner: Syma Cohen
- Website: Lady Esther online

Lady Esther was the trademark of a cosmetic manufacturing company founded by German-born Syma Cohen and her siblings in Chicago in 1913 and operated as Lady Esther Company. It was incorporated in Illinois in 1922 and became America's top selling brand of cosmetics in the United States. Its success in large part can be attributed to Syma and her brother Alfred Busiel and their innovative marketing through in-store demonstrations, print advertising and sponsorship of national radio programs.

In 1949 Syma Cohen sold her half share in the company to her brother Alfred and following his death the company eventually was sold. Subsequently, it had a number of owners. Now a United States company owns the trademark in the United States and a German cosmetic manufacturer owns the business in the rest of the world.

== History ==
Syma Cohen began the cosmetics manufacturing business with some of her siblings, including her sister Esther, after whom the company was named. Esther left the business early on and Syma registered the trade name “Lady Esther”, in her name in 1913. She sold Lady Esther cream and powder going from home to home and later to drug stores in Chicago and vicinity. In 1922 she caused the company to be incorporated as “Lady Esther Company” and its name was later changed to “Lady Esther, Ltd.” The company undertook an aggressive advertising program in newspapers, magazines and by radio on a nationwide basis. In 1923 it advertised its products at an expense of $143,000.00 with an increase each year, and by 1936 it expended more than 1.5 million dollars. During those years its sales were in excess of thirty six million dollars.

The company's first venture into national radio broadcasting was a sponsorship of the Lady Esther serenade featuring Wayne King and his orchestra. The first broadcast was on September 27, 1931 and Wayne King and Lady Esther parted company in 1939-40. The company continued its national broadcasting sponsorship in 1941 with a live CBS Radio series, “The Orson Welles Show”, which was also known as the “Lady Esther Show”. This was followed by a six-season sponsorship of “Lady Esther Presents the Screen Guild Players”.

During this time the company steadily grew and the owners prospered. It had built a 20,000 square foot facility at 5710 Armitage Avenue in Chicago and in 1933 leased the 65,000 square foot four story and basement plant of the Tinkertoy Company at 2012 Ridge Avenue, Evanston, Illinois.

About a year later Syma Cohen purchased a mansion on Sheridan Road in Glencoe, Illinois for $127,000.00. The house was built on 16.89 acres and contained 19 rooms and 7 baths. There were elaborate greenhouses and 3 formal gardens. The site is now the location of North Shore Congregation Israel.

The popularity of Lady Esther began to wane in the middle 1940s. Other businesses were trying to capitalize on the name and the company became very protective of its trademark. Syma sold her share of the business to Alfred and left the company. She traveled extensively throughout the world and later sold the mansion. Her brother Alfred had died in 1951 and the company had numerous owners. Syma Cohen-Busiel moved into a suite in Chicago's Drake Hotel where she died in 1990 at 99 years of age. The trademark owners in the United States are now a pharmaceutical wholesale company which has no production facilities. A German company Lady Esther Kosmetik GMBH is now the trademark owner elsewhere in the world.

== National radio programs ==
=== Wayne King ===
September 27, 1931 – January 25, 1941 The first national radio program sponsored by Lady Esther was “The Lady Esther Serenade” featuring Wayne King and his orchestra. The band's popularity had been boosted by its recording in 1930 of “The Waltz You Saved for Me” which became King's theme song. “The Lady Esther Serenade” was broadcast at least twice a week in primetime on CBS and/or NBC and Lady Esther became America's top-selling brand of cosmetics.

=== The Orson Welles Show ===
September 15, 1941 – February 2, 1942 The show was also known as the Orson Welles Theater and “Lady Esther Presents Orson Welles.” It was a variety show featuring Orson Welles and his Mercury Theater troupe. One program in the NBC series has become a suspense classic. The Hitch-Hiker written by Lucille Fletcher and starring Orson Welles aired on November 17, 1941. Other programs featured Joseph Cotten, Ginger Rogers, Rita Hayworth, John Barrymore and Agnes Moorehead. Scheduled for 26 weeks the show ended prematurely when Welles left on his ill-fated It's “All True” trip to Brazil.

=== The Screen Guild Theater ===
October 3, 1942 – July 7, 1947 Lady Esther was looking for a prestigious show to showcase its products and settled on the Screen Guild Theater which had been sponsored by Gulf Oil. It was first known as the “Lady Esther Presents the Screen Guild Players” and then became the Lady Esther Screen Guild Theater. The radio show brought movies to radio for thirty minutes each Monday evening on CBS, Truman Bradley was the announcer and the orchestra was led by Wilbur Hatch. The show aired for 242 programs beginning with “Yankee Doodle Dandy” starring James Cagney and ending with “My Reputation.” In between were all time classics such as “Casablanca” with Humphrey Bogart and Ingrid Bergman, “Sergeant York” with Gary Cooper and “Holiday Inn” with Bing Crosby, Fred Astaire and Dinah Shore.
