= Irving Cutler =

- Born: 1923; Chicago
- Died: 2023 (aged 99–100); Chicago
- Education: University of Chicago, Northwestern University
- Occupations: Geographer, regional historian of Chicago, writer
- Known for: The Jews of Chicago: From Shtetl to Suburb
- Title: PhD

Irving Cutler (b. 1923 in Chicago – d. July 24, 2023) was an American geographer and regional historian, known for his research on the Jewish community in Chicago.

== Early life ==
He was the son of Zelig Cutler and Frieda (née Wapner). He was born on Washburn Street in Chicago and attended elementary school in North Lawndale. His father ran a foreign press kiosk. During World War II, Irving Cutler served in the Navy. The destroyer on which he served crossed the Atlantic ten times, escorting over sixty freighters carrying American soldiers sent to the front in Europe. After the war, he earned a master's degree in social sciences from the University of Chicago and then a doctorate in urban geography from Northwestern University.

== Career ==
He taught at Chicago State University for 24 years, including ten years as chair of the Geography Department. He also taught at DePaul University. He served as president of the Chicago Geographical Society. He co-founded and served for many years on the board of the Jewish Historical Society of Chicago.

== Recognition ==
- Distinguished Geographer Award by Illinois Geographic Society (2021)
- L’dor V’dor award by The Board of Jewish Education of Metropolitan Chicago (2023)

== Books ==
- Cutler, Irving (1965) The Chicago-Milwaukee corridor: a geographic study of intermetropolitan coalescence, Evanston: Dept. of Geography, Northwestern University Press OCLC 186101
- Cutler, Irving, Norman D. Schwartz & Sidney Sorkin (eds) (1991) Synagogues of Chicago, 2 vols., Chicago: Chicago Jewish Historical Society
- Cutler, Irving (1996) Urban communities, Indianapolis: Merrill Pub Co ISBN 978-0-675-19265-1
- Cutler, Irving (2000) Jewish Chicago: a pictorial history, Charleston: Arcadia Publishing
- Cutler, Irving (2006) Chicago, metropolis of the mid-continent, Carbondale: Southern Illinois University Press ISBN 978-0-7385-6015-1
- Cutler, Irving (2008) The Jews of Chicago: From Shtetl to Suburb, Chicago: University of Illinois ISBN 978-0-252-07644-2
- Cutler, Irving (2009) Chicago's Jewish West Side, Charleston: Arcadia Publishing ISBN 978-1-5316-3893-1

== Journal articles ==
- Cutler, Irving (2016) The Jews of Chicago, Illinois Geographer, 58(1): 5-24.
