= Illinois Holocaust Museum and Education Center =

American museum in Skokie, Illinois

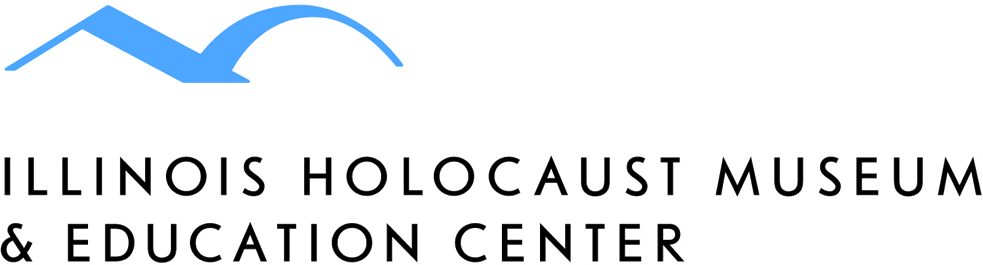

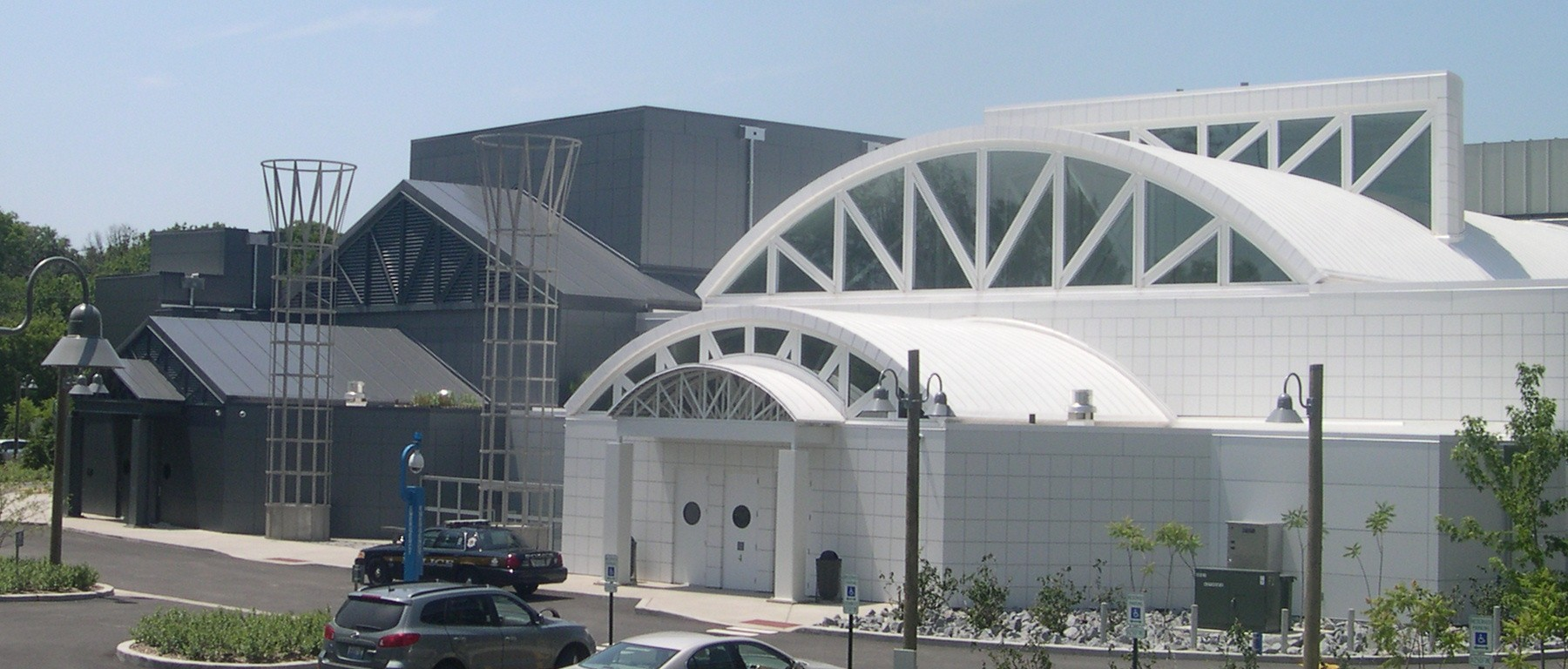
- View of the Museum and Education Center from the Northeast
- Established: 1981 (Original Site); 2009 (Current Site)
- Location: 9603 Woods Drive; Skokie, Illinois
- Coordinates: 42.0566°N 87.7607°W
- Type: Holocaust memorials
- Visitors: over 300,000
- President: Fritzie Fritzshall
- Curator: Arielle Weininger
- Architects: Stanley Tigerman; Yitzchak Mais (designer)
- Public transit access: Pace; CTA
- Website: ilholocaustmuseum.org

The Illinois Holocaust Museum and Education Center is a museum located in Skokie, Illinois, near Chicago. According to the Center's mission statement, its founding principle is to "Remember the Past; Transform the Future." Its mission is to preserve the legacy of the Holocaust by honoring victims' memories and to educate in the service of combating hatred, prejudice, and indifference. The Museum fulfills its mission through its collections-based exhibitions and through education programs and other initiatives that promote human rights and the elimination of genocide.

== History ==
In 1981 the Holocaust Memorial Foundation of Illinois was founded. Shortly after, a 5,000 square foot museum was opened in 1984, located in a storefront on Main Street in Skokie, Illinois. The foundation and small museum were established as a response to a Neo-Nazi group's attempt to march through Skokie, in which many Holocaust survivors had settled in the decades following the atrocities.

On April 19, 2009, the current museum opened to the public in a new building with festivities including a keynote speech by Bill Clinton with Elie Wiesel in attendance. President Barack Obama spoke through a recorded video message, as did Shimon Peres, president of Israel.

Security arrangements at the museum were tightened after the United States Holocaust Memorial Museum shooting on June 10, 2009. Currently, the museum's volunteers include members of the Action Reconciliation Service for Peace and the Austrian Holocaust Memorial Service (since 2009) that work for the museum.

In 2025, the museum was temporarily closed for renovations. In the meantime, a location called Experience360 was opened in River North. The Skokie site reopened in November of 2026. The renovation included the addition of a 240-seat Lillian and Larry Goodman Auditorium, as well as accessible bathrooms on each floor, a new welcome center and lobby, a reflection gallery and wider walkways.

== Take a Stand Center ==
In 2017, the museum opened the Take a Stand Center, four interactive galleries located within the space of the museum that includes interactive Holograms of Holocaust survivors. Connected to the holograph theater is an exhibit concerning organizations and individuals that have promoted human rights including the Universal Declaration of Human Rights, and such figures as Ruby Bridges and Malala Yousafzai.

== Architecture ==
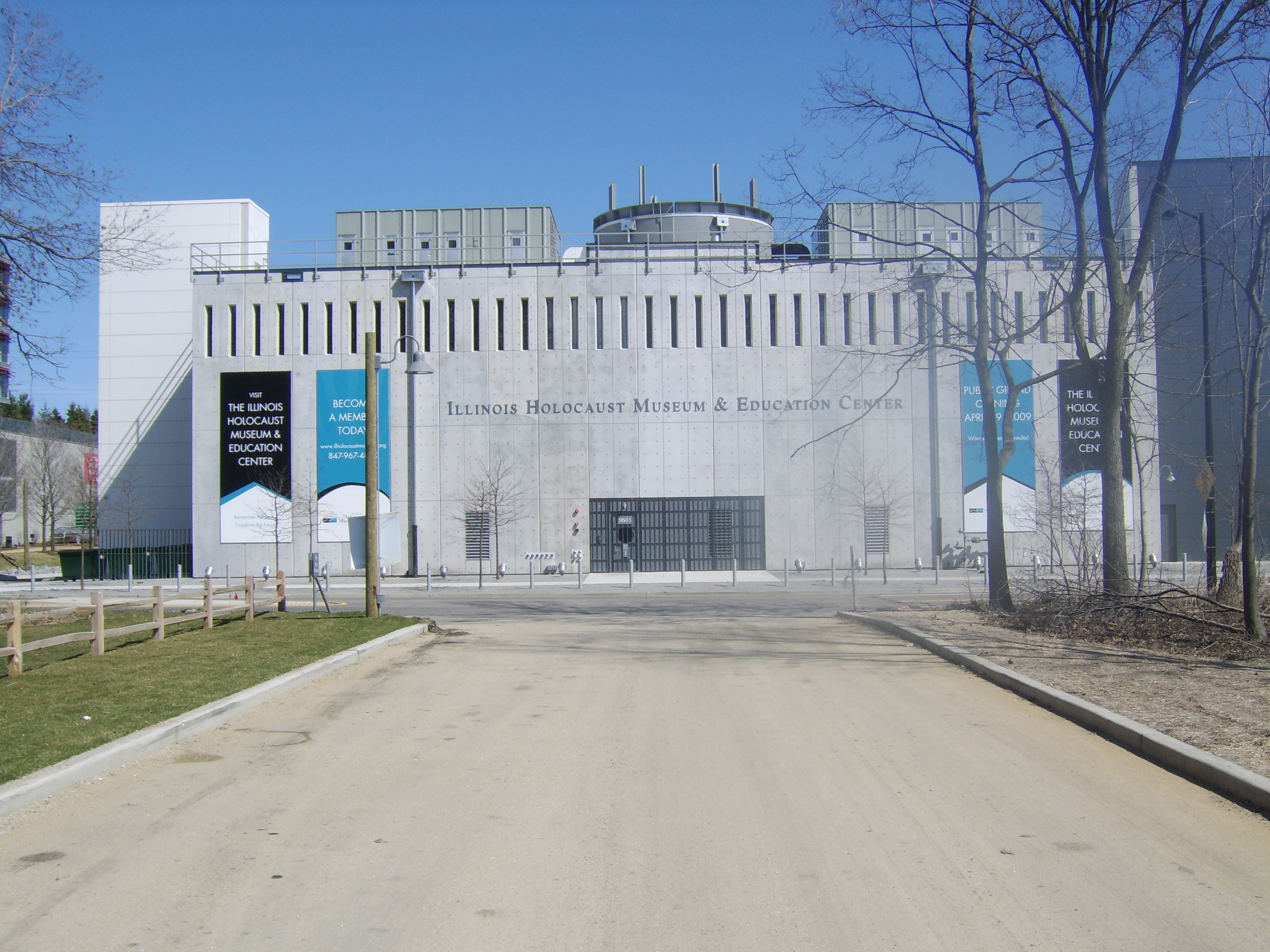
View of museum from the West

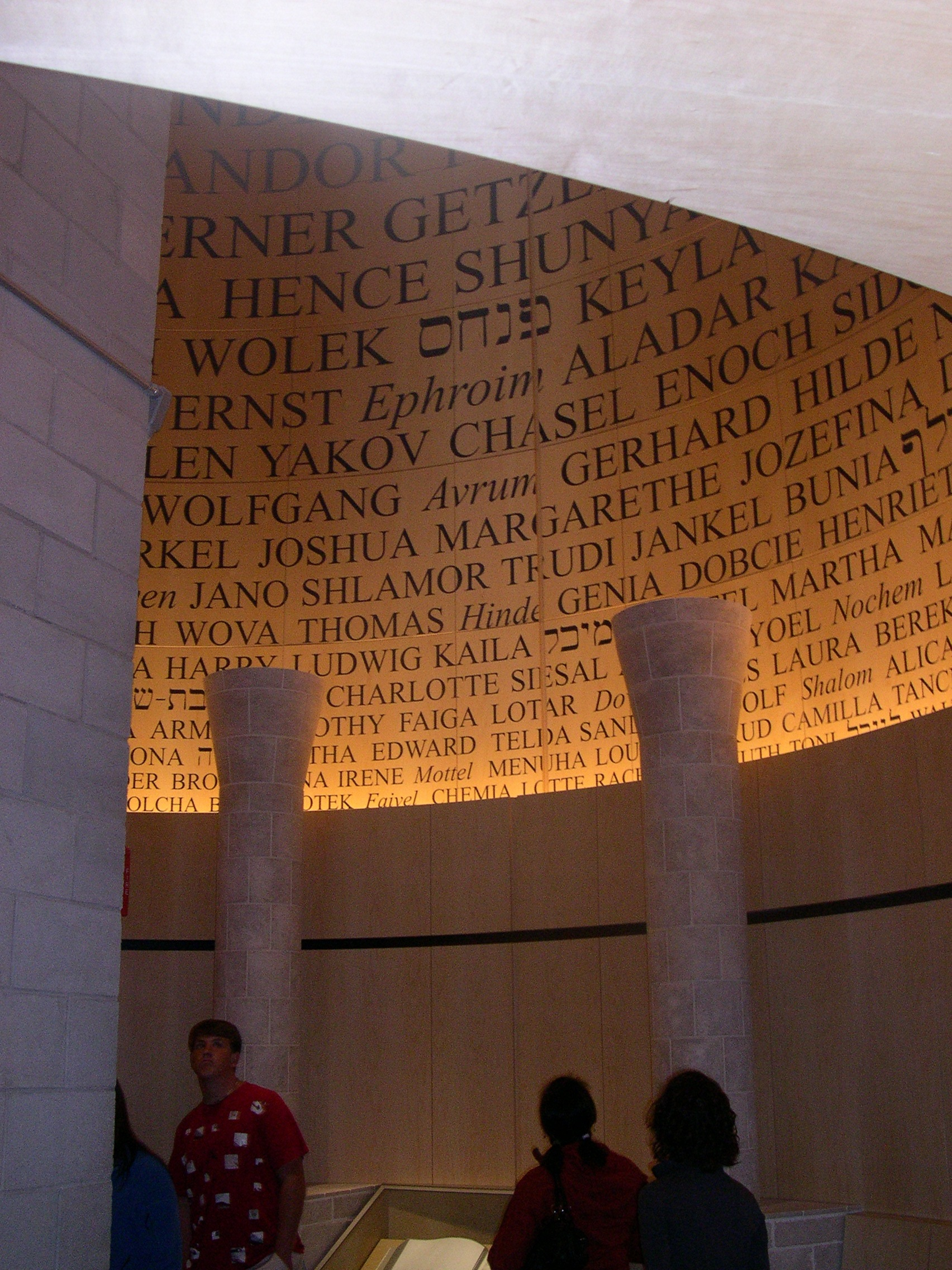
Room of Remembrance

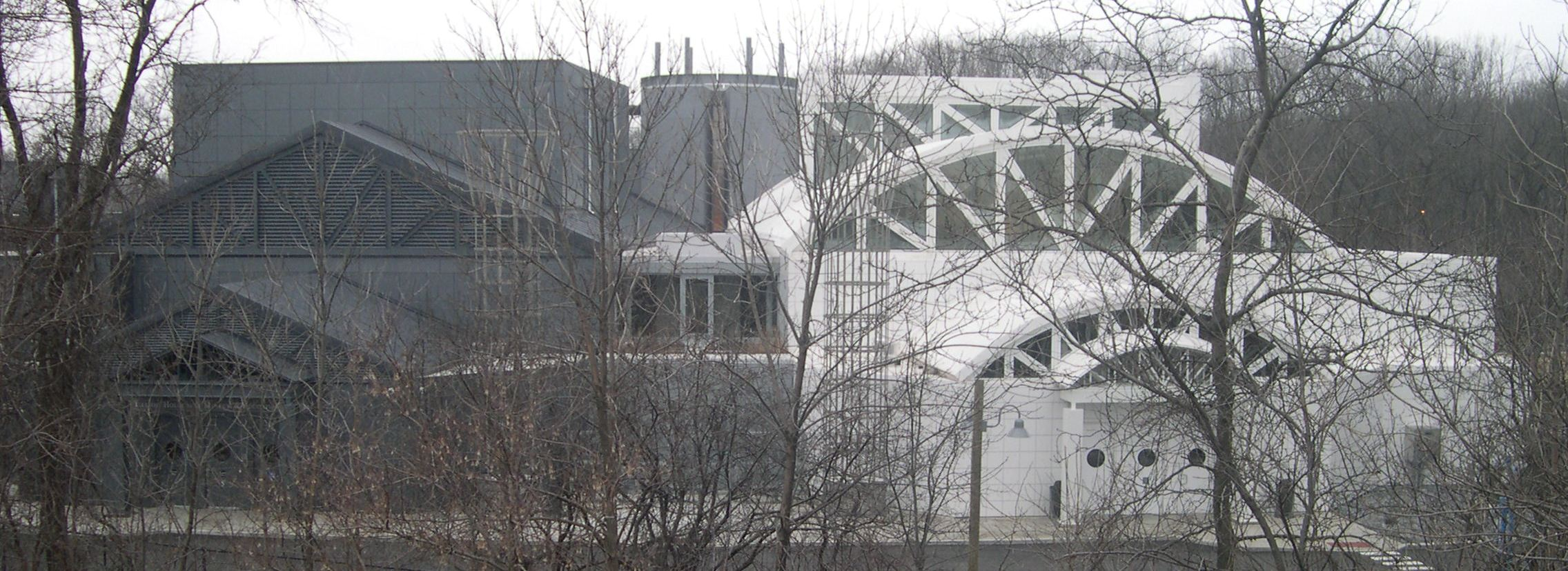
View of museum from the East

The museum's building was designed by Stanley Tigerman. The Interior and Exhibition were co-designed by Yitzchak Mais, a former director of Yad Vashem. The first-floor Holocaust exhibition is located next to the auditorium, the main entrance hall, information and membership desks, a coatroom, a gift shop, and a library.

The upper floor contains the remembrance areas, the art gallery, the upper part of the auditorium, and offices. The basement contains classrooms, an exhibition for children, an exhibition on the building's history, and a conference area.

The building's facade is notably two-toned, a black half that includes the entrance doors and a white half with the exit doors. This facade is located in a narrow alley and situated so that one cannot view the entire facade from any one location.

== Location and access ==
The museum is located in the northwest corner of Skokie, west of the Edens Expressway (I-94). The nearest exit is Old Orchard Road. To the east of the museum is also the abandoned North Shore Line right of way. This right of way is considered for a new CTA Yellow Line extension, with a new terminal station in the proximity of the museum. The museum is already accessible through several bus lines nearby: CTA lines 205 and 54A, and Pace lines 208 and 422.

== See also ==
- History of the Jews in Chicago
- Spertus Institute for Jewish Learning and Leadership: Jewish educational and cultural center in Chicago
