= Chicago Sinai Congregation =

Reform synagogue in Chicago, Illinois, United States

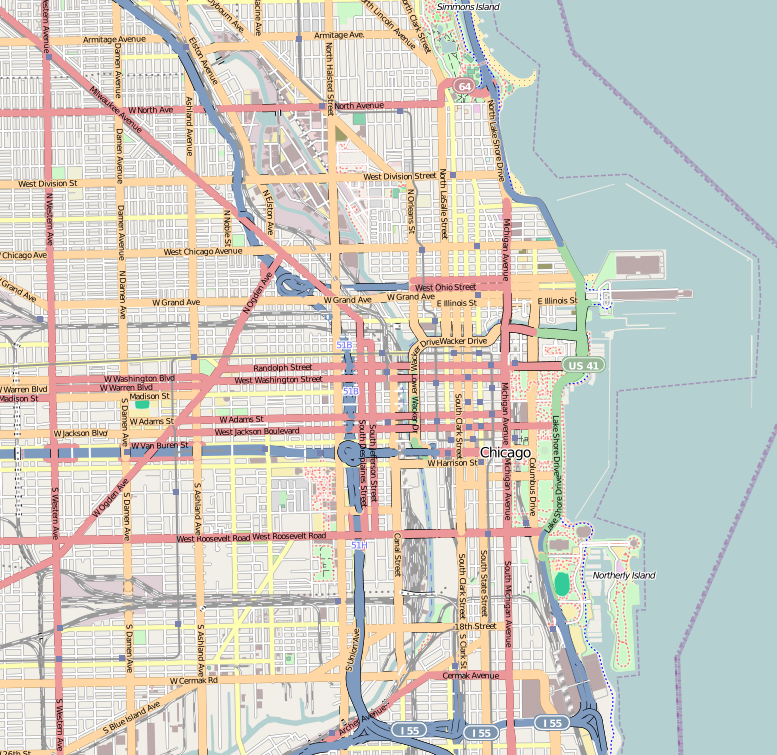
- Location in Central Chicago, Illinois

Religion
- Affiliation: Reform Judaism
- Ecclesiastical or organizational status: Synagogue
- Leadership: Rabbi Michael A. Weinberg (interim); Rabbi Amanda Greene (Associate); Rabbi Rebecca Benoff (Assistant)
- Status: Active
- Notable artwork: Brian Clarke stained-glass windows

Location
- Location: 15 West Delaware Place, Chicago, Illinois 60610
- Country: United States
- Interactive map of Chicago Sinai Congregation
- Coordinates: 41°53′56″N 87°37′43″W

Architecture
- Architect: Dirk Lohan
- Type: Synagogue
- Established: 1861 (as a congregation)
- Completed: 1996

Website
- chicagosinai.org

Chicago Sinai Congregation (Note: Also referred to as Temple Sinai or Sinai Temple.) is a Reform Jewish congregation and synagogue located at 15 West Delaware Place, in Chicago, Illinois, in the United States. Founded in 1861, the current synagogue building was designed by Dirk Lohan and completed in 1996, inclusive of stained-glass windows by British artist Brian Clarke.

== History ==
Founded in 1861, Chicago Sinai Congregation was the first Reform congregation to be established in Chicago. During the nineteenth century, the congregation helped pioneer and promote the controversial ritual reform of the Sunday Sabbath (substituting Saturday for Sunday) for Jewish communities in America.

In the late nineteenth century, the congregation became the site of speculation concerning the possibility of a woman rabbi in the United States. In 1897, Hannah G. Solomon of Chicago was touted in the press as America's first woman rabbi following her preaching at the congregation. Solomon later reported that the invitation to speak was offered by Rabbi Emil Hirsch and that Hirsch's practice to allow Jewish women to speak from the pulpit was later adopted by other congregations.

== Rabbis ==
The early rabbis to have served in the congregation include Bernhard Felsenthal (served from inception in 1861–1864), Isaac Leow Chronik (served from 1866 to 1871), Kaufmann Kohler (served from 1871 to 1880), Emil G. Hirsch (served from 1880 to 1923). Rabbis in the twentieth century include Richard C. Hertz (served from 1947 to 1953), and Philip N. Kranz (served from 1971 to 1980).

== Gallery ==
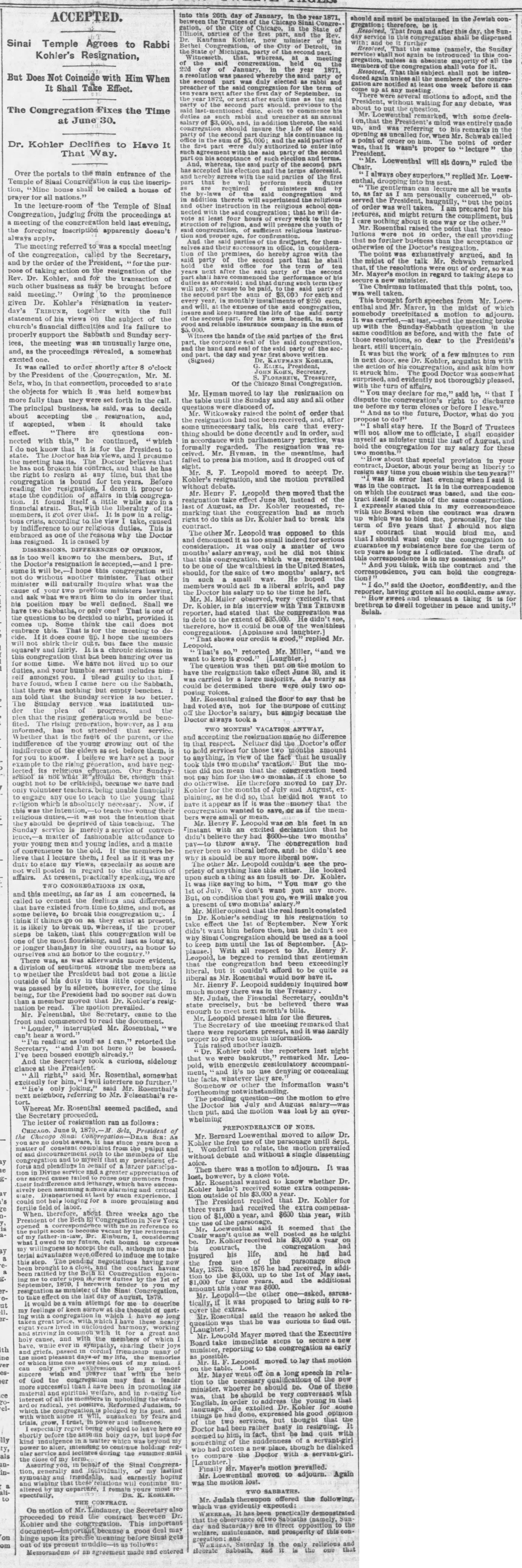
Chicago Tribune reports the resignation of Rabbi Kaufmann Kohler from Chicago Sinai Congregation

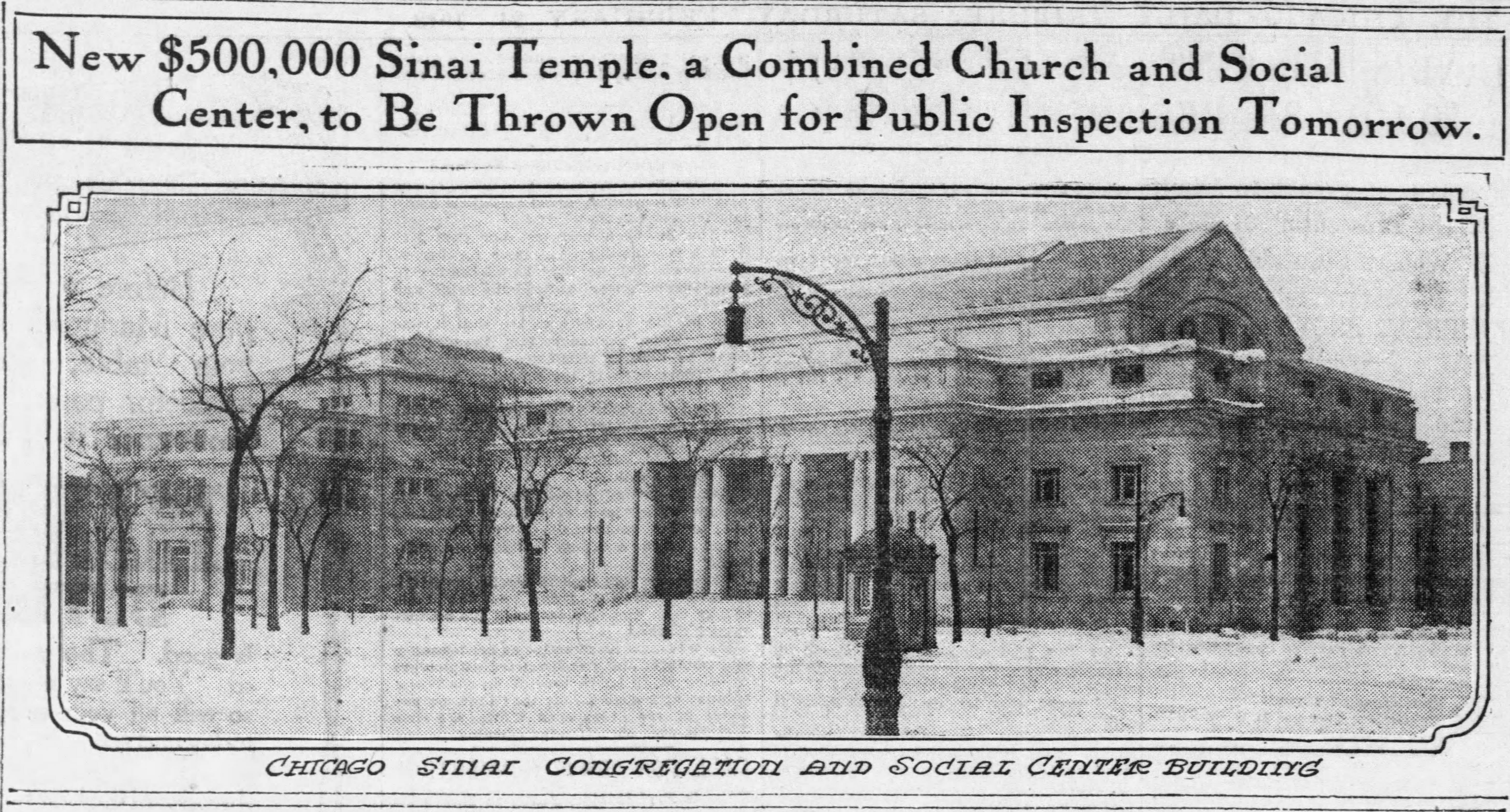
Sinai temple building depicted in 1912

== See also ==
- North Shore Congregation Israel
- History of the Jews in Chicago
