= John Ronan =

American architect (born 1963)

John Ronan (born 1963, Grand Rapids, Michigan) is an American architect, designer and educator based in Chicago, in the United States. John Ronan FAIA is founding principal of John Ronan Architects in Chicago, founded in 1999.

== Education ==
Ronan holds a Master of Architecture degree with distinction from the Harvard University Graduate School of Design and a Bachelor of Science degree from the University of Michigan.

== Career ==
In 1999, he was a winner in the Townhouse Revisited Competition staged by the Graham Foundation and his firm was the winner of the prestigious Perth Amboy High School Design Competition in 2004, a two-stage international design competition to design a 472,000 square foot high school in New Jersey. In December 2000, he was named as a member of the inaugural Design Vanguard by Architectural Record magazine, and in January 2005 he was selected to The Architectural League of New York's Emerging Voices program. John has lectured widely and his work has been exhibited internationally, including the Art Institute of Chicago and The Architectural League of New York's Urban Center. His work has been covered extensively by the international design press. A monograph on his work, entitled Explorations: The Architecture of John Ronan, was published by Princeton Architectural Press in 2010. A publication on his Poetry Foundation building by the Center for American Architecture & Design at the University of Texas was published in 2015 and a forthcoming monograph, Out of the Ordinary, is scheduled for late Fall 2021. His firm has been the recipient of three AIA Institute National Honor Awards—for the IIT Innovation Center (Kaplan Institute), Poetry Foundation and the Gary Comer Youth Center—and in 2016 was one of seven international finalist firms for the Obama Presidential Center. In 2017, Ronan was named Architecture Award winner by the American Academy of Arts and Letters. He is currently the John and Jeanne Rowe Endowed Chair Professor of Architecture at the Illinois Institute of Technology College of Architecture, where he has taught since 1992.

== Personal life ==
Ronan lives in Chicago with his wife and two daughters.

== Completed projects ==
- Poetry Foundation Headquarters - Chicago, IL
- Illinois Institute of Technology Innovation Center (Kaplan Institute) – Chicago, IL
- Gary Comer Youth Center – Chicago, IL
- Independence Library and Apartments – Chicago, IL
- 151 N Franklin Office Tower – Chicago, IL
- Gary Comer College Prep - Chicago, IL
- Christ the King Jesuit College Preparatory School – Chicago, IL
- South Shore International College Preparatory School - Chicago, IL
- Gallery House – Chicago, IL
- Courtyard House – St. Joseph, MI
- Concrete Townhouse – Chicago, IL
- House on the Edge of a Forest – Northbrook, IL
- Lockrum Villas – Anguilla, BWI
- Yale Steam Laundry - Washington, DC
- Akiba-Schechter Jewish Day School - Chicago, IL
- Erie Elementary Charter School – Chicago, IL
- Blu Dot – Chicago, IL

== Awards ==
- 2021 AIA National Housing Award, Independence Library and Apartments
- 2020 AIA National Honor Award for Architecture, IIT Innovation Center
- 2020 AIA/ALA National Library Award, Independence Library and Apartments
- 2019 AIA National Innovation Award, IIT Innovation Center
- 2019 AIA/CAE National Education Facility Design Awards, IIT Innovation Center
- 2017 R+D Award, Architect Magazine, IIT Innovation Center Dynamic ETFE Façade
- 2017 American Academy of Arts and Letters 2017 Architecture Award Winner, John Ronan
- 2016 Faith and Form/IFRAA Honor Award, St. Ignatius Chapel
- 2012 American Architecture Award, The Chicago Athenaeum Museum of Architecture & Design, Poetry Foundation
- 2012 AIA Institute National Honor Award for Architecture - Poetry Foundation
- 2011 American Architecture Award, The Chicago Athenaeum Museum of Architecture & Design, Gary Comer College Prep
- 2011 American Architecture Award - Gary Comer Youth Center
- 2011 Rudy Bruner Award for Urban Excellence - Gary Comer Youth Center/Gary Gomer College Prep
- 2011 AIA/CAE Educational Facility Design Award - Gary Gomer College Prep
- 2011 Richard Driehaus Foundation Award - Christ the King Jesuit College Prep High School
- 2010 Best of Year Award - Chapel of St. Ignatius Loyola
- 2010 Green Good Design Award - Gary Comer Youth Center
- 2010 Best of Year Award, Interior Design Magazine, Chapel of St. Ignatius Loyola
- 2009 Award of Excellence, Green Roofs for Healthy Cities, Gary Comer Youth Center
- 2009 AIA National Honor Award for Architecture, Gary Comer Youth Center
- 2009 AIA Interior Architecture Award - Yale Steam Laundry Condominiums
- 2007 AIA Distinguished Building Award - Akiba-Schechter Jewish Day School
- 2007 American Architecture Award - Gary Comer Youth Center
- 2005 Emerging Voices, The Architectural League of New York
- 2005 P/A Award Citation, Perth Amboy High School
- 2001 I. D. Design Award, Redsquared
