= Stop Terror-Financing and Tax Penalties on American Hostages Act =

- Long title: To amend the Internal Revenue Code of 1986 to postpone tax deadlines and reimburse paid late fees for United States nationals who are unlawfully or wrongfully detained or held hostage abroad, to terminate the tax-exempt status of terrorist supporting organizations, and for other purposes.
- Nicknames: H.R. 9495

Codification
- Acts amended: Internal Revenue Code of 1986

Legislative history
- Introduced in the House by Claudia Tenney (R‑NY) and Brad Schneider (D‑IL) on September 9, 2024

The Stop Terror-Financing and Tax Penalties on American Hostages Act was a proposed United States congressional bill to grant the U.S. Treasury Secretary authority to designate any section 501(c)(3) nonprofit as a "terrorist supporting organization" and revoke its tax-exempt status.

== History ==
Claudia Tenney (R-NY-24) and Brad Schneider (D-IL-10) co-sponsored the bill in September 9, 2024. On November 21 the bill passed the House by a vote of 219-184, with all but 15 Democrats voting against it. All but one Republican voted in favor of the bill; Thomas Massie (KY-04) was the lone "no" vote among them. The bill stalled in the Senate and did not move forward.

== Opposition ==
The bill has been opposed by the American Civil Liberties Union, the Council on Foundations and other organizations, who argued that it could be invoked to punish political opponents and stifle free speech.
