= Wayne King =

American songwriter and bandleader (1901–1985)

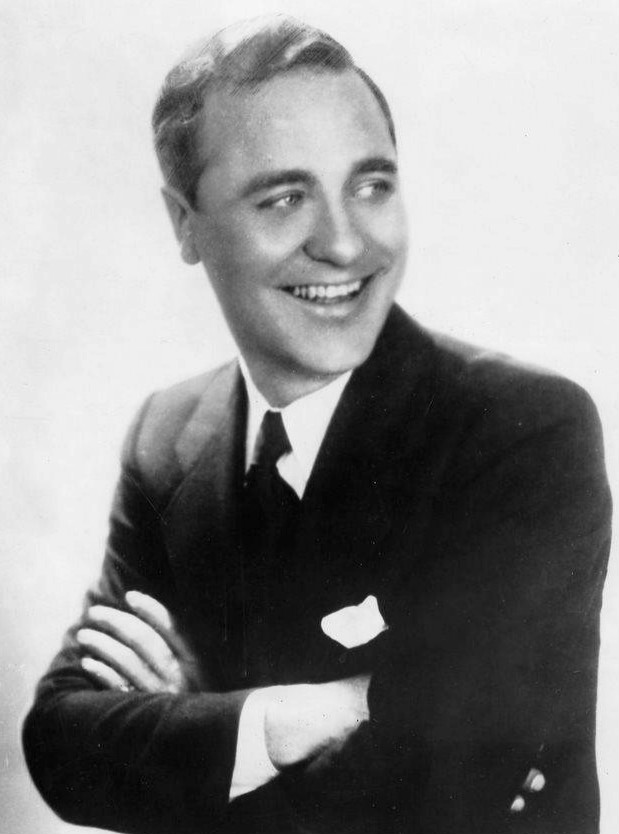
- King in 1931.

Background information
- Born: Harold Wayne King; February 16, 1901; Savanna, Illinois, U.S.
- Died: July 16, 1985 (aged 84) Paradise Valley, Arizona, U.S.
- Genres: Big band
- Occupations: Musician, bandleader
- Instrument: Alto saxophone
- Years active: 1927–1983
- Labels: RCA Victor; Decca
- Formerly of: Bob Eberly; Buddy Clark

Harold Wayne King (February 16, 1901 – July 16, 1985) was an American musician, songwriter, and bandleader with a long association with both NBC and CBS. He was referred to as "the Waltz King" because much of his most popular music involved waltzes; "The Waltz You Saved for Me" was his standard set-closing song in live performance and on numerous radio broadcasts at the height of his career. King's innovations included converting Carrie Jacobs-Bond's "I Love You Truly" from its original 2/4 time over to 3/4.

== Early life ==
Harold Wayne King was born in Savanna, Illinois, the son of Harvey and Ida King. His father worked for the railroad and traveled frequently, so when King's mother died in 1908, he and his brothers lived in the Annie Whittenmeyer orphanage in Davenport, Iowa, for a brief period of time. He returned to Savanna in 1911 to live with his aunt and uncle, where he was the quarterback and captain of the football team at Savanna Township High School, where he graduated in 1920. He briefly played professional football with the Canton Bulldogs. He also began taking saxophone lessons as a teenager. King attended Valparaiso University in Indiana for two years, but left to begin a music career.

== Career ==
After playing alto saxophone for the Paul Whiteman Orchestra, he created "Wayne King and His Orchestra" in 1927. The group opened the new Aragon Ballroom in Chicago in 1927, and they continued playing there for much of King's career. He began recording for RCA/Victor Records in 1929. However, the orchestra didn't rise to prominence until they were featured on "The Lady Esther Serenade", a national radio program sponsored by Lady Esther cosmetics from 1931 to 1937.

The orchestra disbanded during World War II, and King joined the army, advancing to the rank of major. The orchestra was reestablished in 1946. In 1948, the half-hour Wayne King Show was syndicated on radio via transcription discs. King's orchestra had a television show in Chicago from 1949 to 1952. The telecast was carried by most Midwest NBC Television affiliate stations.

In early 1958, he appeared as a guest challenger on the TV panel show To Tell The Truth. King was awarded a star on the Hollywood Walk of Fame in the Radio category in 1960.

King's orchestra played its last engagement in March 1983 at the Van Wezel Performing Arts Hall in Sarasota, Florida.

== Personal life ==
King died in July 1985 in Paradise Valley, Arizona. His wife, silent film actress Dorothy Jones King, kept his urn with her for the rest of her life following their 53 years of marriage. She died on March 10, 2010, at the age of 98. They had two children, Wayne King II and Penelope King Pape.

In 2004, King was honored in his hometown of Savanna, with a sign acknowledging that he was a resident of the town.

== Recordings ==
- "Goodnight, Sweetheart" (1931)
- "Dream a Little Dream of Me" (1931) a #1 hit
- "Maria Elena" (1941) a #2 hit
- "All Alone" (1946)
- "Dancing with Tears in My Eyes" (orchestral, 1952)
- "Isle of Golden Dreams" (1957)
- "Golden Favorites" (1962)
- "Cecilia" (1965)
