= Council on Foundations =

Nonprofit organization in Arlington, United States

- Abbreviation: COF
- Formation: 1949
- Type: Nonprofit membership association
- Tax ID no.: 13-6068327
- Legal status: 501(c)(3) organization
- Purpose: Philanthropic association of grantmaking foundations and corporations
- Headquarters: Washington, D.C., United States
- Region served: United States and internationally
- President and CEO: Kathleen P. Enright
- Chair of the board: Jay Williams
- Website: cof.org

The Council on Foundations, founded in 1949, is a non-profit membership association of over 1000 grant-making foundations and corporations in the US and internationally. The organization is designated as a 501(c)(3) tax-exempt charitable organization by the Internal Revenue Service.

The council is led by Kathleen P. Enright, who serves as its CEO and president, and Jay Williams, who is the chairman of the board of directors.

== History ==
Under the leadership of Edward L. Ryerson, a Chicago steel executive, the National Committee on Foundations and Trusts for Community Welfare was organized in 1949 with support from community foundations including the Chicago Community Trust. The organization was incorporated in New York in 1957 as the National Council on Community Foundations and renamed the Council on Foundations in 1964 after expanding membership to include family and corporate foundations.

== Mission and role ==
The Council's mission is to support grantmaking foundations and corporate giving programs through advocacy, professional development, and research on philanthropic practices. The Council on Foundations serves as a membership association for grant-making foundations and corporations, supporting the philanthropic sector through leadership, advocacy, and resources. The Council's membership includes independent, family, corporate, and community foundations, as well as corporate giving programs. Family foundations constitute approximately one-third of the membership.

== Advocacy ==
In line with its advocacy role, the Council has engaged in national policy efforts. In 2025, it joined a coalition opposing provisions in H.R.1, a bill that proposed increased excise taxes on private foundations. The Council argued that such measures would reduce the funds available for charitable grants and negatively impact non-profit organizations reliant on foundation support.

The Council on Foundations joined other major nonprofit advocacy organizations in opposing Section 4 of H.R. 9495, legislation that would grant the Treasury Secretary authority to designate section 501(c)(3) nonprofits as "terrorist supporting organizations" and revoke their tax-exempt status. The organization expressed particular concern about due process protections, noting that the legislation would allow the Treasury Secretary to revoke tax-exempt status without disclosing full evidence or reasoning to the accused organization, placing the burden of proof on nonprofits to demonstrate their innocence within 90 days. While supporting efforts to prevent nonprofits from funding terrorism, the Council on Foundations argued that the bill's approach "provides the executive branch with expansive new authority that could be abused," even for law-abiding organizations providing humanitarian assistance in conflict zones under authorized sanctions exemptions.

== See also ==
- Private foundation
- Community foundation
