= Akiba-Schechter Jewish Day School =

Coordinates: 41.80029°N 87.58529°W

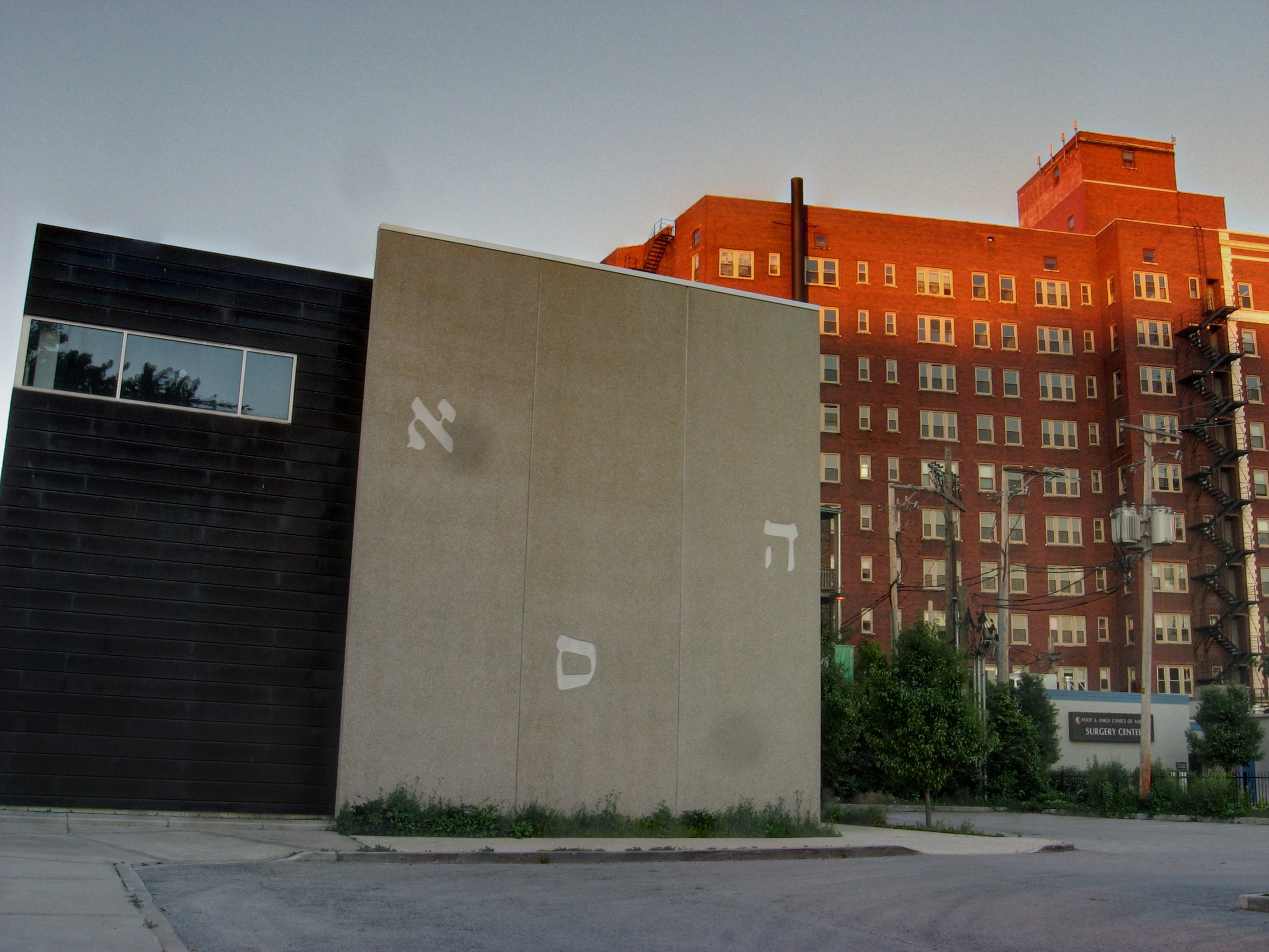
- Hyde Park, Chicago, Illinois; United States

Information
- Religious affiliation: Judaism
- Established: 1972; 54 years ago

Akiba-Schechter Jewish Day School is a private Jewish day school in Hyde Park, Chicago. It is the only Jewish school on Chicago's South Side and attracts a wide range of students from across the Chicago metropolitan area. Tuition for the 2023-2024 school year is between $24,730 and $26,190 based on grade level.

== History ==
The school came into existence in 1972 through the merger of an Orthodox-affiliated school, Akiba South Side Jewish Day School (founded in 1949), and a school affiliated with the Conservative movement, Solomon Schechter South Side School (founded in 1965). Since the merger, Akiba-Schechter has been run under the auspices of both the Associated Talmud Torahs (Orthodox), the Board of Jewish Education (Community), and now the Jewish United Fund of Chicago.

In 1998, the School purchased from Congregation Rodfei Zedek two buildings in which it had operated since 1972: Hoffman House (home to the elementary school) and a 1965 building, used for the pre-school. In 2005, Hoffman House was replaced by a new elementary school building designed by John Ronan. Ronan has received numerous prestigious awards for the new building, including an award from the Chicago Architecture Foundation.

During the summer of 2007, a major renovation of the original 1965 building was undertaken, including upgrades of the heating, cooling, plumbing, and electrical systems, and installation of modern exterior windows. The second phase of the renovation is planned and will include interior finishes, a renovated administrative office suite that features a new Teacher Resource Library and the renovation and expansion of the Pre-School playground.

In 2012, a lawsuit was filed against Akiba-Schechter making allegations of racial discrimination against a Black former student.

Akiba is under the leadership of Principal Miriam Kass. Over the past 15 years, Ms. Kass has worn many hats at Akiba-Schechter. She was the president of the Board of Directors, an award-winning 3rd/4th grade teacher, and most recently the Director of Teaching and Learning. In all her roles, she employs creative strategies and relishes opportunities to build community and strengthen characters.

== Pre-school ==
The Pre-School was founded in 1982. The preschool is now led by Carla Goldberg, a Kohl McCormick Early Childhood Teaching Award winner in 2000. Akiba-Schechter's Pre-School and Kindergarten is a NAEYC (National Association for the Education of Young Children) accredited program. The Preschool uses a play-based and Reggio Emilia-inspired curriculum. Unlike the Grade School, the preschool is open to non-Jews.

== Notable alumni ==
- Caroline Glick (1983), Israeli-American journalist
- Miriam Kass (2008 to present), winner of the Steinhart award for Excellent Teaching

== See also ==
- History of the Jews in Chicago
