= Yale Steam Laundry =

- U.S. National Register of Historic Places
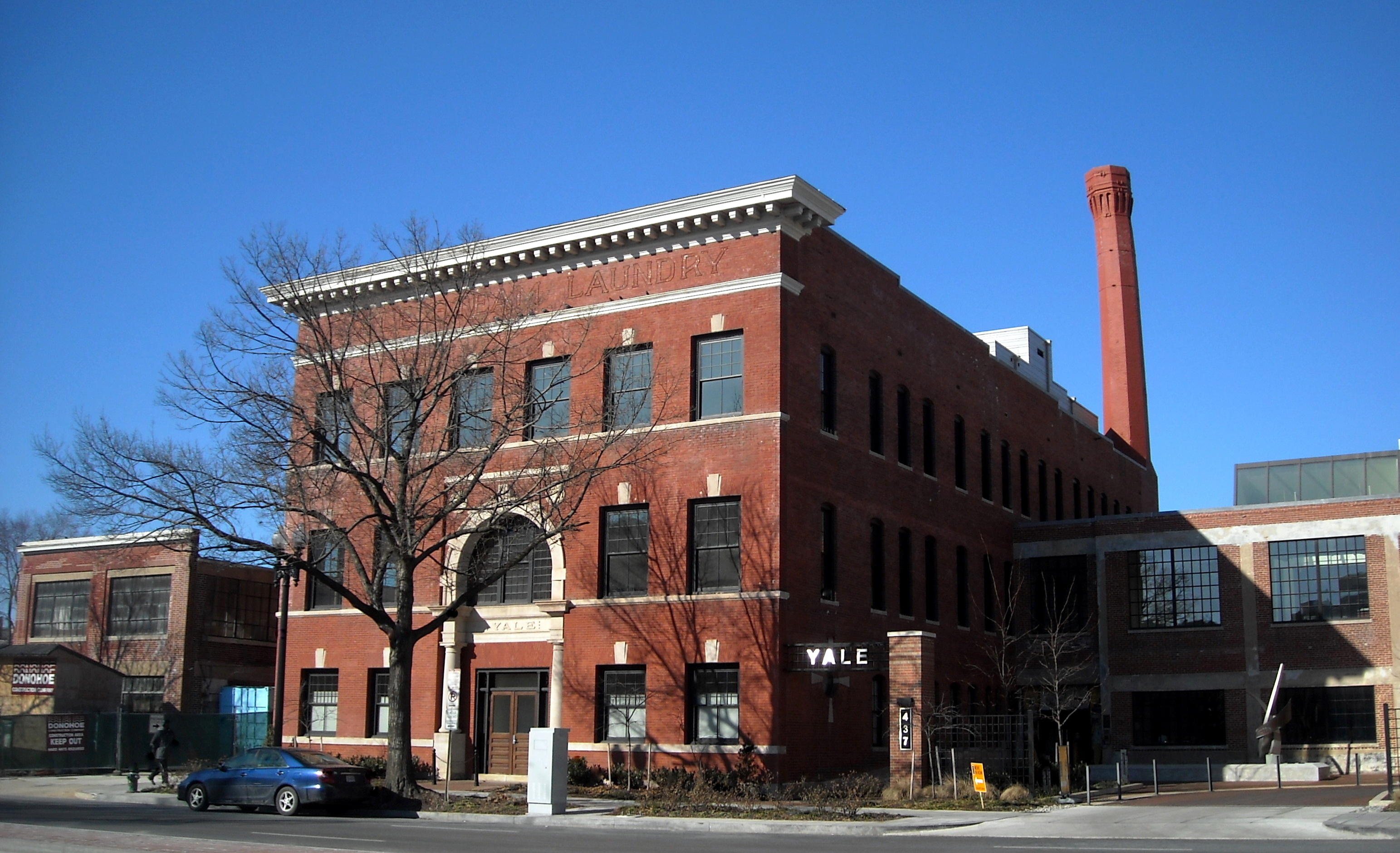
- Yale Steam Laundry in 2010

- Location within Central Washington, D.C. Location within the District of Columbia Location within the United States
- Location: 437–443 New York Avenue, N.W., Washington, D.C.
- Coordinates: 38°54′16.39″N 77°1′1.1″W
- Built: 1902, 1919, and 1924
- NRHP reference No.: 99000332
- Added to NRHP: March 18, 1999

The Yale Steam Laundry is a historic residence located on 437–443 New York Avenue, Northwest, Washington, D.C., in the Mount Vernon Square neighborhood.

== History ==
The original Yale Steam Laundry complex includes three, Neo-Renaissance, and Colonial Revival facilities built in 1902, 1919, and 1924, to the designs of architect Alfred B. Mullett and Thomas Francis, Jr. The laundry closed in 1976.

The building was redeveloped as condominiums by Scott Fuller, designed by architect John Ronan, and completed in 2008.

The original buildings were listed on the National Register of Historic Places (NRHP) in 1999. In addition, the buildings are designated as contributing properties to the Mount Vernon Square Historic District, listed on the NRHP in 1994.

== See also ==
- Manhattan Laundry: Another historic laundry in Washington, D.C.
