= History of the Jews in Chicago =

Chicagoland Jewish history

Jews began immigrating to Chicago in the 1830s, primarily from Eastern Europe and Germany.

Starting in the 1950s, the Jewish population within the city declined and by the end of the 20th century was older and more well-educated than the Chicago average. At the end of the 20th century there were a total of 270,000 Jews in the Chicago area, with 30% in the city limits. In 1995, over 80% of the suburban Jewish population lived in the northern and northwestern suburbs of Chicago. At this time, West Rogers Park was, and continues to be, the largest Jewish community within the city of Chicago. Recent decades have seen a resurgence in urban Chicago's Jewish population, particularly beyond the boundaries of traditional Jewish neighborhoods.

The 2020 estimate of the Jewish population in metropolitan Chicago is around 319,600, according to Brandeis University's Chicago Report. The population of Jewish people within the City of Chicago's limits is estimated to be around 120,000, with another 200,000 residing in the suburbs surrounding the major city.

== Early history ==
Jews began arriving in Chicago shortly after its incorporation in 1833. The first Jewish settlers were Ashkenazim, with a group of mostly Bavarian German Jews arriving in the late 1830s and early 1840s. The first Jewish religious service in Chicago was held on Yom Kippur in 1845. Many early Jewish immigrants worked as peddlers before establishing small stores, some of which grew into significant businesses. During this period, the Jewish community steadily expanded, and at the onset of the American Civil War, it organized a company of 100 Jewish recruits to join the 82nd Illinois Infantry Regiment.

Initially, most Jewish Chicagoans lived in the downtown area. Following the Great Chicago Fire, many relocated to the South Side. By the 1870s, the Jewish community centered around the neighborhood now known as Bronzeville before gradually moving farther south to lakefront neighborhoods such as Hyde Park, Kenwood, and South Shore.

=== Immigration from Eastern Europe ===
The first wave of Eastern European Jewish immigration began in the 1870s, with many arriving from shtetls in Poland and Russia. These Eastern European Jews largely settled in the Maxwell Street area on Chicago's Near West Side, one of the city's poorest neighborhoods at the time. They founded the Maxwell Street Market and established 40 synagogues. Many worked as artisans, factory laborers (primarily in the clothing industry), peddlers, and small-scale merchants. Irving Cutler noted that this community recreated elements of the Old World shtetl, with its numerous Jewish institutions and culture.

Eastern European and German Jewish communities in Chicago remained largely separate until the mid-20th century due to differing cultural and religious practices.

By the 1910s, Eastern European Jews began relocating to wealthier neighborhoods. The largest group moved to North Lawndale on the West Side, while others settled in Northwest Side neighborhoods including Albany Park, Humboldt Park, and Logan Square. Lakefront neighborhoods on the North Side including Lakeview, Rogers Park, and Uptown also attracted Eastern European Jews. Additionally, some joined the established German Jewish community on the South Side.

The Maxwell Street area became a center of Jewish-American organized crime in America, when the area was dominated by Eastern European Jewish immigrants from the 1880s to the 1920s. Like other ethnic groups in the area, the Jews organized themselves into gangs. The Chicago Tribune in 1906 referred to the Maxwell Street area as "the crime center of the country". Other contemporary news reports refer to it as "Bloody Maxwell" and "the Wickedest Police District in the World." Independent Jewish groups ran by gangsters like Jules Portuguese, Davy Miller and Benjamin Zuckerman ran the Maxwell Street and greater Lawndale areas. Later Chicago Outfit affiliated Jews like Leonard Patrick and David Yaras took over the area when they killed Zuckerman and unseated his organization.

=== Early communities in satellite cities ===
In the 19th century, Jews began settling in the satellite cities surrounding Chicago. Jewish communities and synagogues were established in many of these cities, including Waukegan, Maywood, Chicago Heights, Joliet, Elgin, and Aurora, as well as Hammond and Gary in Northwest Indiana. As urban sprawl expanded, these areas were gradually incorporated into the broader Chicago metropolitan area.

== Growth and suburbanization ==
By 1930, Chicago's Jewish population had grown to 275,000, making it the third largest Jewish community in the world after New York City and Warsaw. Eastern European Jews made up 80% of the city's Jewish population, which accounted for 8% of Chicago's total residents at the time. The 1954 Study of the Jewish Population of Chicago made the following estimates of the Jewish population in 1931 by community area:

- North Lawndale – 75,400
- West Town and Humboldt Park – 28,100
- Albany Park – 23,400
- West Garfield Park – 18,000
- East Garfield Park – 15,300
- South Shore – 11,600
- Rogers Park – 10,800
- Uptown and Edgewater – 9,600
- Hyde Park – 9,000
- Austin – 7,300
- Logan Square – 7,100
- Lakeview – 6,300
- North Center/Irving Park/Avondale – 5,600
- Englewood and Grand Crossing – 4,100
- Kenwood – 4,100
- North Park – 3,600
- Woodlawn – 3,400
- Chatham/Avalon Park/South Chicago – 3,200
- Near North Side and Lincoln Park – 2,900
- West Ridge (West Rogers Park) – 1,800
- Lincoln Square – 1,500
- West Lawn/Chicago Lawn (Marquette Park)/West Englewood – 800

Starting after World War II, wide-scale suburbanization of the Chicago-area Jewish community began, influenced by white flight, the availability of affordable vacant land, and the opening of the interstate highways. The percentage of Chicago-area Jews residing within the city limits declined from 95% in 1950 to 60% by the early 1960s. This shift paralleled a broader decline in Chicago's white population and their disinvestment from the city. By the early 1970s, the majority of Chicago-area Jews lived in the suburbs.

=== Intracity developments ===
Population and institutional shifts within the City of Chicago accompanied suburbanization. The 1954 Study of the Jewish Population of Chicago made the following estimates of the Jewish population in 1951 by community area:

- North Lawndale – 42,300
- Albany Park – 26,400
- Rogers Park – 18,400
- South Shore – 17,800
- Uptown and Edgewater – 16,400
- Lakeview – 16,100
- Hyde Park – 14,700
- West Town and Humboldt Park – 11,400
- West Ridge (West Rogers Park) – 11,200
- Austin – 7,400
- Logan Square – 6,700
- North Center/Irving Park/Avondale – 6,500
- East Garfield Park – 5,600
- West Garfield Park – 5,300
- Chatham/Avalon Park/South Chicago – 5,300
- Kenwood – 5,300
- Near North Side and Lincoln Park – 5,000
- North Park – 3,700
- West Lawn/Chicago Lawn (Marquette Park)/West Englewood – 3,500
- Englewood and Grand Crossing – 2,800
- Lincoln Square – 2,100
- Woodlawn – 1,900

One surviving example of this institutional landscape is the former First Romanian Congregation Synagogue on Douglas Boulevard, later Stone Temple Baptist Church, which served as a synagogue from 1925 to 1954.

North Lawndale's Jewish population plummeted from nearly 65,000 in 1946 to around 500 by 1956, largely due to white flight. Many Jews fleeing North Lawndale and other neighborhoods experiencing similar demographic shifts moved to West Rogers Park, which became the hub of Chicago's Orthodox Jewish community, along with its smaller neighboring community, North Park. West Rogers Park had a notable Jewish presence as early as the 1930s and, following the postwar migration, became majority-Jewish, peaking at around 47,000 Jewish residents in the 1960s.

During the 1950s, the South Side Jewish community expanded into neighborhoods including Jeffery Manor, Beverly, and Calumet Heights as Jews left neighborhoods with increasing Black populations such as Kenwood, Hyde Park, Woodlawn, Englewood, and Chatham. The 1960s saw a significant exodus of Jews from the South Side, largely driven by white flight, with most relocating to the North Side or the suburbs.

Temple Beth Am, the last synagogue in South Shore, merged with Temple Sholom in 1975. By that time, the Kenwood-Hyde Park area remained the only South Side neighborhood with a substantial Jewish population, along with small communities based around synagogues on the Southeast Side and in Marquette Park.

=== North Shore and suburbs ===
In the post-World War I era, a group of wealthy Jews, primarily descendants of German immigrants, settled in Chicago's exclusive North Shore suburbs, including Glencoe and Highland Park.

Homebuilders, often Jewish themselves, advertised to Jewish communities and constructed single-family detached houses in suburbs near the Edens Expressway including Skokie and Lincolnwood. While the North Shore suburbs increasingly became home to wealthy Jewish families, some, especially Kenilworth and Lake Forest, barred Jews from moving in. The Jewish Federation of Metropolitan Chicago estimated in 1975 that 40,000 of Skokie's 70,000 residents were Jewish.

=== Chicago Southland ===
The movement of Jews to the Cook County suburbs of the Calumet Region began in the late 1940s. This shift was sparked by the development of Park Forest, Illinois, and sprawled into the established Jewish community in nearby Chicago Heights. By 1949, Park Forest was home to a chapter of the National Council of Jewish Women, a B'nai B'rith lodge, and a Hebrew school. In the 1950s, as the Jewish population grew to comprise 15% of the village's total population, two synagogues were established.

By the 1970s, nearby suburbs such as Homewood, Flossmoor, Olympia Fields, and Glenwood had notable Jewish population. This community has since dwindled due to white flight and its geographical isolation from other Jewish communities in Chicagoland.

As of 2024, two synagogues remain active in Chicago's South Suburbs: one in Homewood and one in Joliet.

== Stabilization ==
=== 1982 population study ===
A 1982 study found there were about 248,000 Jews in the Chicago metropolitan area, making up about 4% of the population. By this time, the Jewish communities on the west and northwest sides of the city had almost completely disappeared. The city neighborhoods with the highest percentage of Jewish residents in 1982 were West Rogers Park and North Park. Outside of these neighborhoods, the vast majority of Jews who remained in the city lived in the lakefront neighborhoods north of the Loop. A smaller, but still sizable community, remained in Kenwood-Hyde Park. A small, shrinking, mostly elderly community remained in Albany Park, which only a few decades before had been one of the largest Jewish neighborhoods in the Midwest.

The 1982 study highlighted that the suburbs with the highest percentage of Jewish residents included Skokie and Lincolnwood (bordering West Rogers Park and North Park), Bannockburn, Deerfield, Highland Park, and Glencoe (situated on or near the North Shore), and a young, growing population in Buffalo Grove. Significant Jewish populations were found in the Calumet Region and in northern and northwestern suburbs, including Des Plaines and unincorporated Maine Township, Evanston, Glenview, Morton Grove, Niles, Northbrook, Wheeling, and Wilmette.

=== Irving Cutler's research ===
In 1995, 80% of the 248,000 Jews in the Chicago area lived north of Lawrence Avenue, with 62% residing in suburban communities. Glencoe, Highland Park, Lincolnwood, and Skokie had estimates of being nearly 50% Jewish; Buffalo Grove and Deerfield had estimates of being over 25% Jewish; and Evanston, Glenview, Morton Grove, Niles, Northbrook, Wilmette, and Winnetka had estimates of being 10-25% Jewish. As younger families moved to the Far Northwest Suburbs, the suburban Jewish population became more geographically dispersed, complicating the provision of Jewish-oriented services. Irving Cutler wrote that inter-suburban movement was occurring among Jews.

In 1995 Cutler wrote that the Jewish populations of Deerfield and Northbrook had experienced recent growth; he also stated that the Jewish community of Buffalo Grove was "large and growing". Cutler observed a decline in Skokie's Jewish population, attributing it to the children of post-World War II households moving to other suburbs.

In 1995, 85,000 Jews lived in the City of Chicago, with 80,000 of them living in contiguous Jewish communities within the city and in a series of northside lakefront communities. The contiguous Jewish communities included West Rogers Park and the lakefront area extending from the Chicago Loop to Rogers Park. Hyde Park-Kenwood remained the only South Side community with a substantial Jewish population.

Historian Irving Cutler stated that Jews living in southern and western suburbs of Chicago and in Northwest Indiana "often feel removed from the mainstream of Chicago Jewry" and have smaller numbers than the main group of Jews to the north. In 1995, the Oak Park-River Forest-Westchester area to the west had a Jewish community. Northwest Indiana cities such as East Chicago, Hammond, and Michigan City continued to have Jewish communities; Cutler stated that the Northwest Indiana Jewish populations were "small and often declining".

In the latter half of the 20th century, the Jewish population in Chicagoland declined due to declining Jewish immigration, lower birth rates, intermarriage, and younger generations feeling alienated from the community. Assimilation became more widespread, which led to the decline of Yiddish being spoken in the Jewish community.

== Present day ==
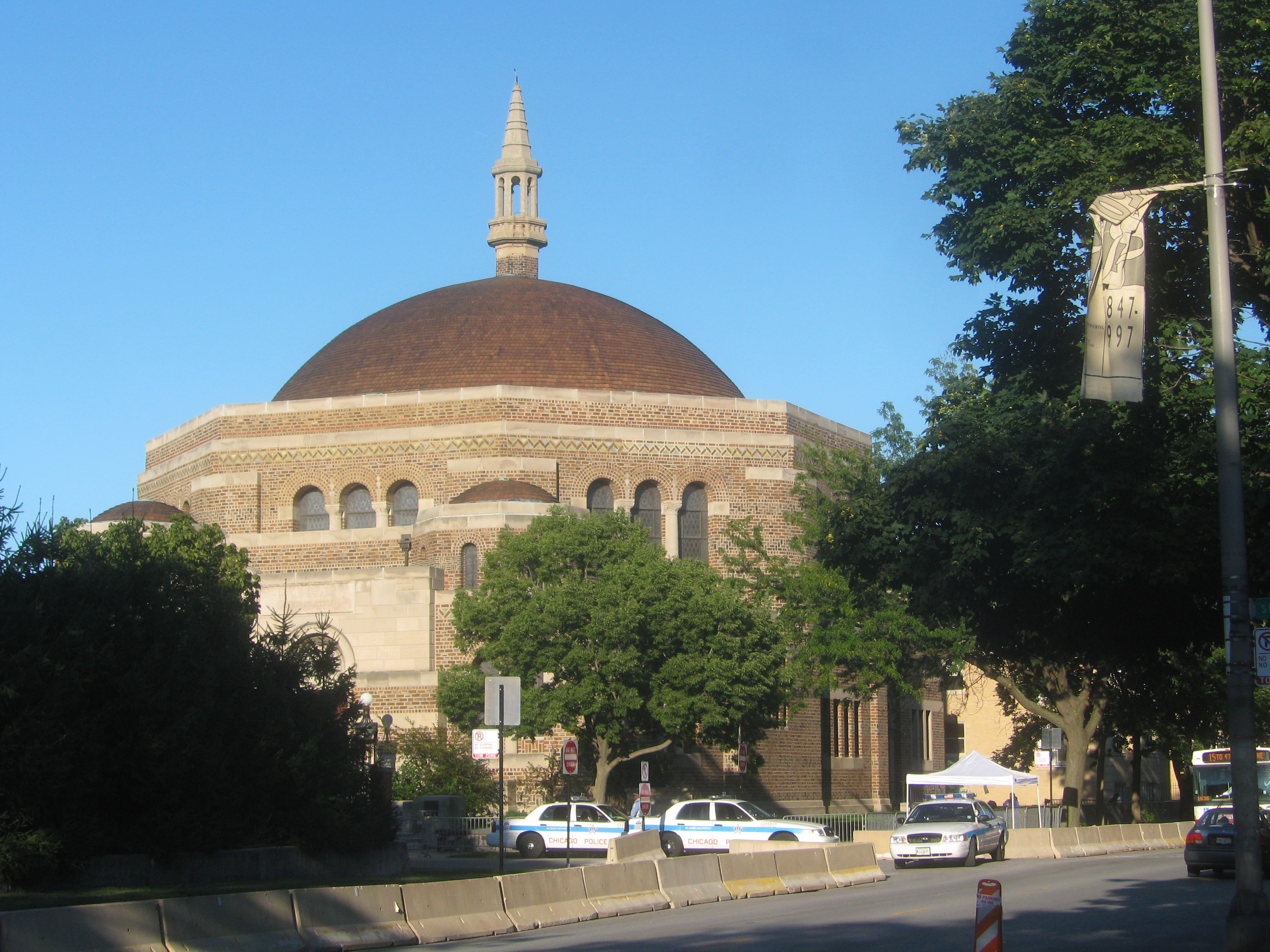
K.A.M. Isaiah Israel Temple in the Chicago neighborhood of Kenwood

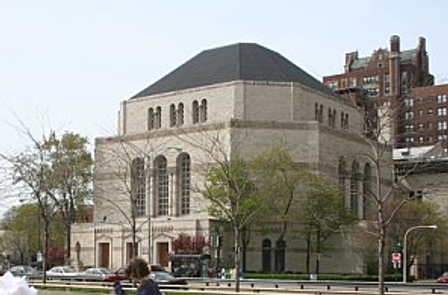
Temple Sholom in Chicago's neighborhood of Lakeview

In 2020 there are reported to be 319,600 Jewish people living in Cook, DuPage, Kane, Lake, McHenry and Will Counties—about 3.8% of the metro population. These residents are spread out among a total of 175,800 households with an additional 100,700 non-Jewish people living in these Jewish households. Of the Jewish adult population in metropolitan Chicago, 86% are Ashkenazi, followed by No particular heritage (9%), Sephardi (4%), Mizrahi (1%), and Other (2%).

According to the study, approximately 37% of Chicago-area Jews live within city limits, 34% in North suburbs, 18% in the Northwest suburbs, 8% in West suburbs, and 3% in South suburbs. The total Chicago-area Jewish population is estimated to have risen 3% between 2010 and 2020, with Jewish households increasing 19% over the same period - indicating that household sizes are decreasing over time.

The 2020 Metropolitan Chicago Jewish Study noted a 16% decrease in the Jewish population of Skokie, Glenview, Niles, and Morton Grove between 2010 and 2020. In contrast, every other division within the metropolitan area experienced growth in its Jewish population. The North Shore saw a 25% increase in the Jewish population over the period, and the adjacent Northwest Suburbs experienced Jewish growth of 17% from 2010 to 2020, which suggests that much of the exodus from Skokie and near suburbs is being absorbed by communities further to the north and west.

Between 2010 and 2020, the Jewish population in Chicago experienced its fastest growth in areas outside the Far North Side. Within the Far North Side—including the long-standing Jewish communities in West Rogers Park, Peterson Park, and Rogers Park—the Jewish population grew by 32%. These growth rates were the highest among Chicagoland's metropolitan divisions, suggesting a shift in the urban-suburban population balance back toward the city.

As of 2020, about one-third of North Shore residents in Cook County identify as Jewish. Additionally, approximately 10% of the population on Chicago's North Side and in the nearby northern and northwestern suburbs are Jewish. In Chicago's south and west suburbs, the Jewish population is sparse and dispersed, especially outside of Oak Park.

Reform and Conservative synagogues have continued to shrink and close while Jewish organizations including The Rohr Jewish Learning Institute aim to make Judaism relevant to the community.

== Institutions ==
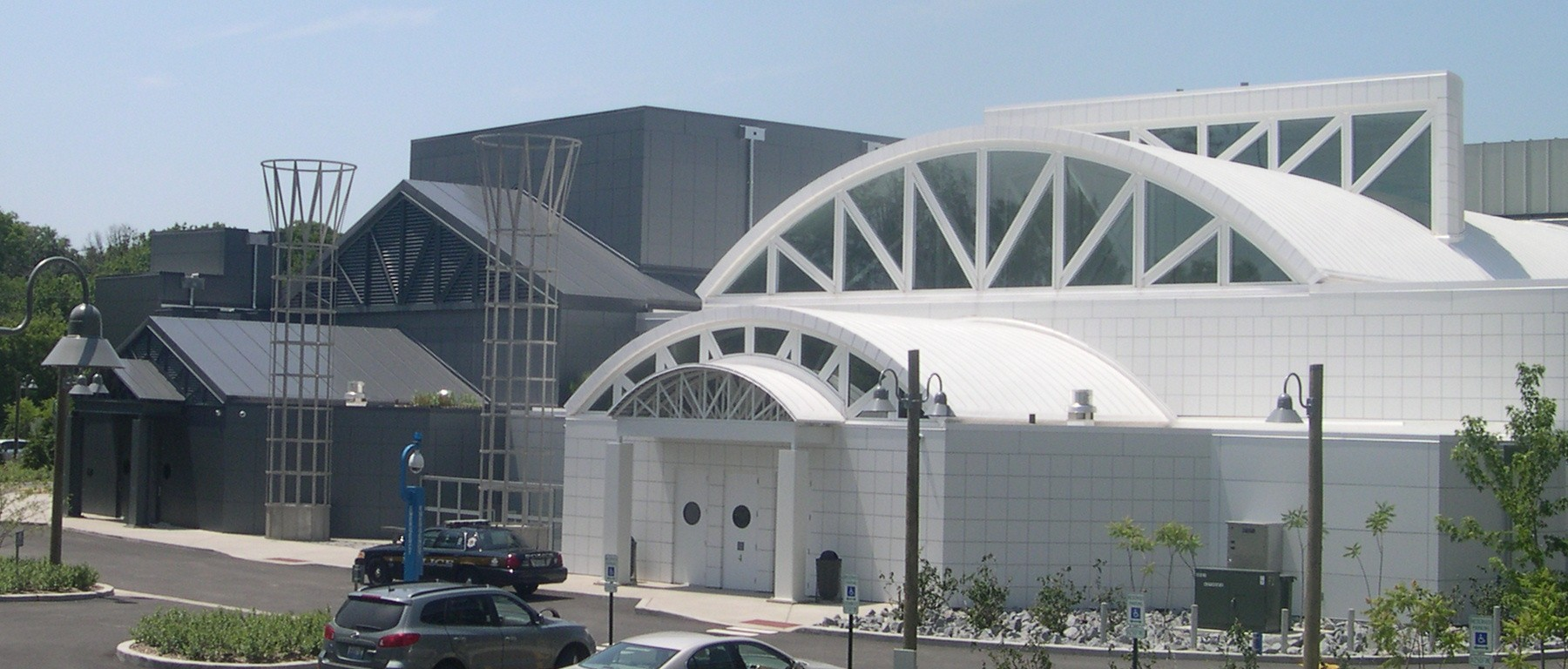
Illinois Holocaust Museum and Education Center

The United Hebrew Relief Association (UHRA) was founded in 1859. Fifteen Jewish organizations, including some B'nai B'rith lodges and some women's organizations, together founded the UHRA.

Chicago's German Jewish community founded several institutions including Michael Reese Hospital, The Drexel Home for Aged Jews in the Woodlawn neighborhood, and The Standard Club (an exclusive private club located in the Loop). Jewish immigrants from Eastern Europe founded the Jewish Training School in 1890, the Chicago Maternity Center in 1895, and the Chicago Hebrew Institute in 1903. Beth Moshev Z'elohim (Orthodox Jewish Home for the Aged) was founded in North Lawndale in 1900.

In 1968, the Gerontological Council of the JF was established. In 1971, The Council for Jewish Elderly, later renamed to become CJE SeniorLife, was founded by the Jewish Federation to provide services to elderly Jews.

The Illinois Holocaust Museum and Education Center is located in Skokie.

== Education ==
In 1995 Jews in Chicago attend universities at twice the rate of the overall population, which contributed to the overall higher than average incomes.

Spertus Institute for Jewish Learning and Leadership is located in Chicago.

Universities include:

- Hebrew Theological College

Primary and secondary schools:

- Akiba-Schechter Jewish Day School
- Bernard Zell Anshe Emet Day School
- Chicago Jewish Day School
- Fasman Yeshiva High School
- Ida Crown Jewish Academy
- Rochelle Zell Jewish High School (former Chicagoland Jewish High School)
- Telshe Yeshiva

== Congregations ==
Chicago's first synagogue, Kehilath Anshe Mayriv (KAM), was established in 1847 at the intersection of Lake and Wells in The Loop by German Jewish immigrants. In 1852, a group of 20 Polish Jews, dissatisfied with KAM's practices, founded Kehilath B'nai Sholom, a congregation with a more Orthodox orientation. In 1861, the Sinai Reform Congregation was formed by former KAM members under the leadership of Rabbi Bernhard Felsenthal. This congregation initially held services in a church near LaSalle and Monroe.

In 1920 a synagogue opened in Glencoe. This synagogue, the first synagogue in the North Shore, was a branch of the Sinai Congregation (Reform) of the South Side and eventually became the North Shore Congregation Israel, an independent synagogue. In 1952 the first synagogue serving Lincolnwood and Skokie, the Niles Township Jewish Congregation, opened.

In 1995, there were about 24 Jewish congregations in Lincolnwood and Skokie. Most of them were Conservative or Orthodox, or Conservadox synagogues. In 1995 the North Shore had mostly Reform congregations. In the same year, the following further-out suburbs with newer Jewish settlement had synagogues: Buffalo Grove, Des Plaines (now closed), Hoffman Estates, Vernon Hills, and Wheeling. In that year, six synagogues were in the area around Buffalo Grove. West Rogers Park had a larger group of Orthodox synagogues.

The majority of synagogues that remain in the city of Chicago are Orthodox and concentrated in West Rogers Park. There are three Conservative synagogues within city limits: Central Synagogue in the Loop (formerly the South Side Hebrew Congregation of South Shore until the 1970s), Congregation Rodfei Zedek in East Hyde Park, and Anshe Emet in Lakeview. There are four Reform synagogues within city limits: Chicago Sinai Congregation, Emanuel Congregation, Temple Sholom, and KAM Isaiah Israel.

== Notable Jews of metropolitan Chicago ==
- Paul Adelstein
- Max Adler
- Saul Alinsky
- Morey Amsterdam
- Bob Balaban
- Felix Biederman
- Saul Bellow
- Mike Bloomfield
- Neil Bluhm
- Leonard Chess
- Henry Crown
- Larry Ellison
- Ari Emanuel
- Ezekiel Emanuel
- Rahm Emanuel, Mayor of Chicago
- Ephraim Epstein
- Milton S. Florsheim
- Richard Garfinkle
- Neil Giuntoli
- Arthur Goldberg
- Maurice Goldblatt
- Benny Goodman
- Albert Grossman
- Ernest A. Grunsfeld Jr.
- Seymour Hersh
- Albert H. Loeb
- Henry Horner, Governor of Illinois
- Peter Jacobson
- Ben Joravsky
- Karen Lewis
- Edward H. Levi
- Steven Levitan
- David Mamet
- Edward Morris
- Ira Nelson Morris
- Nelson Morris
- Arnie Morton
- William S. Paley
- Mandy Patinkin
- Jeremy Piven
- Sol Polk
- Abram Nicholas Pritzker
- Daniel Pritzker
- Donald Pritzker
- Gigi Pritzker
- Harry Nicholas Pritzker
- Jack Nicholas Pritzker
- Jay Pritzker
- J. B. Pritzker – Governor of Illinois
- John Pritzker
- Nicholas J. Pritzker
- Penny Pritzker
- Rhoda Pritzker
- Robert Pritzker
- Thomas Pritzker
- Julius Rosenwald
- Lessing J. Rosenwald
- William Rosenwald
- Abram M. Rothschild
- Jack Ruby
- Ernest Samuels
- Allan Sherman
- Edwin Silverman
- Gene Siskel
- Joseph Spiegel
- Marcus M. Spiegel
- Morris (Moshe) Soller
- Jill Stein
- Fisher Stevens
- Max Thorek
- Studs Terkel
- Mel Torme – grew up in Kenwood
- Sam Zell
- Warren Zevon
