= Manhattan Laundry =

- U.S. National Register of Historic Places
- U.S. Historic district – Contributing property
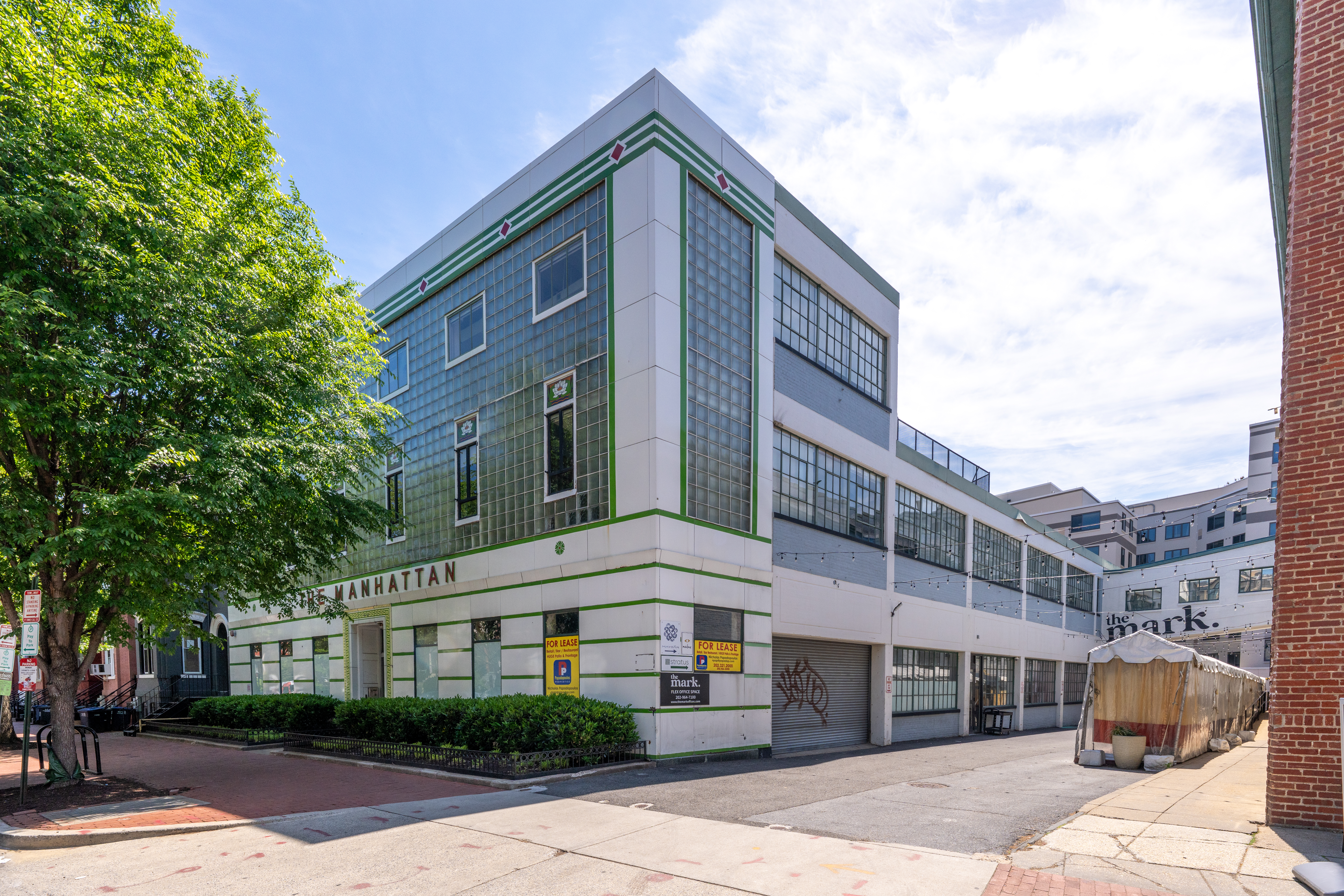

- Location within Washington, D.C.
- Location: 1326-1346 Florida Ave., NW; Washington, D.C.
- Coordinates: 38°55′12″N 77°1′51″W
- Built: 1877
- Architectural style: Art Deco
- Part of: Greater U Street Historic District (ID93001129)
- NRHP reference No.: 94001327
- Added to NRHP: November 21, 1994

Manhattan Laundry is a complex of historic buildings located in the Shaw neighborhood of Washington, D.C. It was listed on the National Register of Historic Places in 1994.

== History ==
The complex originally housed the traction facility for a streetcar company. The oldest building on the site, the west building at 1346 Florida Ave, was built in 1877. The complex became a printing plant in 1892 and it was converted into a laundry in 1905. It is part of the expansion of Washington's urban core and industrial development along Florida Avenue. In 1999, the building was home to the Artomatic art installation, bringing together artists to temporarily transform unused spaces into a gallery for visual and performative arts.

== See also ==
- Yale Steam Laundry: Another historic laundry in Washington, D.C.
