= The Waltz You Saved for Me =

1930 song by Wayne King, Emil Flindt and Gus Kahn

Song
- Written: 1930
- Composers: Wayne King, Emil Flindt
- Lyricist: Gus Kahn

"The Waltz You Saved for Me" is a popular song written in 1930 by Wayne King and Emil Flindt with lyrics by Gus Kahn. The song soon became associated as the theme song of Wayne King and His Orchestra.

Notable artists who have recorded the song include: Al Bowlly (1931), Bert Ambrose (1931), Roy Smeck (1931), Light Crust Doughboys (1935), Bing Crosby (1938), Bob Wills And His Texas Playboys (1938), Robert Hamilton and His Orchestra (1950), John Schroeder's Playboys, Cliffie Stone (1952), Billy Vaughn (1955), Lenny Breau (1956), Merle Travis (1956), Bill Doggett (1961), Ferlin Husky (1961), Living Strings (1962), Gene Summers (1966), John Anderson (1982), and Emmylou Harris (1982).
