= CJE SeniorLife =

- Founded: 1971
- Type: Non-profit organization
- Tax ID no.: 36-2727597
- Location: 3003 W. Touhy Ave, Chicago, Illinois
- Region served: Chicago metropolitan area
- Services: Direct social services, healthcare, senior housing, caregiver support
- President and CEO: Dan Fagin
- Affiliations: Jewish United Fund of Metropolitan Chicago
- Website: www.cje.net
- Formerly called: Council for Jewish Elderly

CJE SeniorLife is a not-for-profit partner with the Jewish United Fund of Metropolitan Chicago in providing direct social services, healthcare, and support to Chicago-area residents of all faiths. Originally founded as the Council for Jewish Elderly, the organization was renamed CJE SeniorLife in 2008.

== History ==
The origins of CJE SeniorLife can be traced to a report of the Research Department of the Jewish Federation (JF) on Services to the Aged. The report related trends in the Chicago elder population and details about the Jewish homes for the aged supported by the JF. In the 1960s, the provision of elderly services in Chicago was not optimal, and the issue of providing for this population was foremost. At this time, Ronald Weismehl, a local social and aging issues consultant, appealed to the US House of Representatives for government support of organizations for the elderly. At a hearing, he testified in favor of strengthening the Older Americans Act of 1965, advocating for a comprehensive policy on aging.

The three homes for the aged, Park View, BMZ, and Drexel Home, were either inadequate or in deteriorating neighborhoods. With the boards of these homes and other service agencies proposing different solutions, it was determined that a comprehensive study of the homes and other elderly services should be conducted. To this end, the Jewish Federation commissioned a study by Brandeis University's renowned Professor of Social Planning, Dr. Robert Morris and Dr. Sidney Lee, the President of Michael Reese Hospital in 1967. They recommended formation of a community gerontological council to facilitate the development of cooperative arrangements among the various elderly agencies.

In 1968, the Gerontological Council was formed with staff from affiliate agencies and the Federation Board with Ronald Weismehl named executive director. In 1969, the Council appointed members to a Joint Planning Committee of Service and Care for the Jewish Elderly to conduct hearings and study recommendations. In 1970 the Committee produced “A Jewish Community Plan for the Elderly –Report to the Gerontological Council.” This Plan was endorsed by the Federation Board and its agencies. An interim organization, the Central Coordinating and Planning Organization for the Elderly, was formed to set up the recommended agency. The resulting Council for Jewish Elderly was incorporated. Weismehl reported in detail that a prodigious study of the field was required and that two years of hard work led up to the formation of the council.

The academic and Holocaust survivor Zev Harel noted the strong need for coordination of eldercare services and cited the successful expansion of services to a segment of the Jewish community in Chicago. He referred to the Federation's efforts to form an agency and felt that it worked because it was flexible, and care could be targeted to different groups and individuals. Thus the Council for Jewish Elderly, now CJE SeniorLife, came into existence and was authorized as a new affiliated agency by Federation in 1971.
