= John Tree =

U.S. Air Force general

John N. Tree
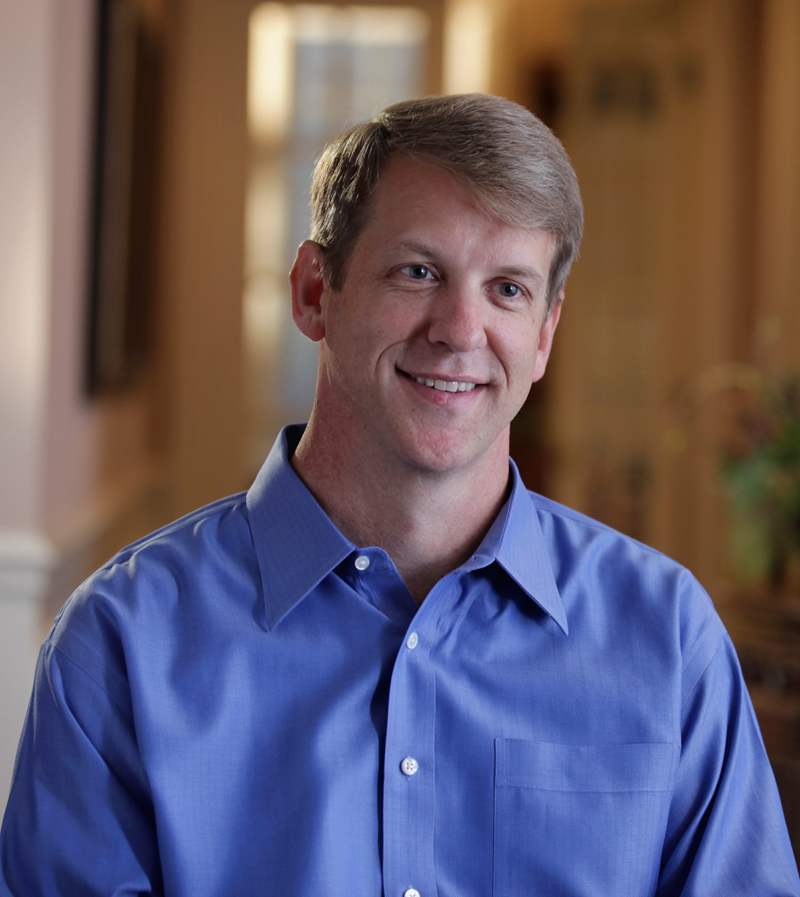

Personal details
- Born: May 7, 1966 (age 60) Provo, Utah, U.S.
- Party: Democratic
- Spouse: Michelle Tree
- Education: United States Air Force Academy (BS); Chaminade University (MBA); University of Oklahoma (MA)
- Profession: Air Force Officer (Reserve), Major general (United States); Business Executive

Military service
- Allegiance: United States of America
- Branch/service: United States Air Force
- Years of service: 1990–2024
- Rank: Major General
- Unit: HQ, United States Air Force, Pentagon
- Awards: Defense Superior Service Medal

Major General John Tree is an American business owner and a major general in the United States Air Force Reserve, currently serving as the Senior Reservist (Mobilization Assistant) to the Air Force Chief of Staff at the Pentagon in Washington DC. In this role he assists the Chief with the organization, training and equipping of 685,000 active-duty, Guard, Reserve and civilian forces serving in the United States and overseas. Previously he was the Senior Reservist to the Director for Logistics, Engineering and Security Cooperation (J4), Headquarters, U.S. Indo-Pacific Command, Camp H.M. Smith, Hawaii. In that capacity he assisted the Director with the planning, coordination, and integration of strategic Logistics, Engineering and Security Cooperation in support of U.S. National Defense Strategy in order to build U.S. and partner capacities to accomplish the USINDOPACOM mission across the Asia-Pacific theater. For his work in the Pacific, General Tree was awarded the Defense Superior Service Medal.

Prior to this he was assigned as the senior reservist to Commander of the Oklahoma City Air Logistics Complex, at Tinker AFB, Oklahoma, with $3B in revenue and over 9,000 employees. The complex performs programmed depot maintenance on many large aircraft and engines for the Air Force, Navy and foreign military sales.

He was also a candidate for the United States Congress with the Democratic Party. In November 2011, he announced his candidacy for Illinois's 10th congressional district. He did not win the primary election held on March 20, 2012 and he subsequently returned to private industry.

He joined the Air Force in 1990 following his graduation from the United States Air Force Academy, and served on active duty for seven years in the supply chain, logistics, plans, and acquisition career fields. He then transferred to the Air Force Reserve in 1997, beginning his Reserve career which continues to the present time.

In his civilian life, he and his wife own and operate a large Packaging Solutions company in Southern California. He has held many positions up to CEO and President of various logistics and supply chain companies, along with consumer product companies. He began his corporate career in marketing and brand management with Procter & Gamble, and then with Kellogg’s, where he was the Director of wholesome snacks, managing such icon brands as NutriGrain, Rice Krispies Treats, and Special K bars. This portfolio of brands generated over $400 million in annual sales. After leaving Kellogg’s in 2004, he created a national beverage company to provide healthy snack drinks to baby boomers. He went on to manage Caymen Ventures, Inc., which focused on identifying middle market companies for sale in the consumer goods, food and beverage, logistics and supply chain sectors. He has previously served as the CEO of Raymond Express International, in produce and logistics, and then Valudor Products, LLC, an importer of specialty chemicals.

He is married to Michelle Tree, and they have 5 children. It is the second marriage for both of them. Tragically, his oldest daughter from his first marriage, Stephanie Tree, died from an accidental drug overdose in August, 2011. He continues to talk about the dangers of drugs and alcohol whenever possible in hopes of preventing future senseless tragedies.

He's an Eagle Scout and his hobbies include home improvement projects, foreign languages, and travel. He is a PADI Divemaster and Master Scuba Diver.

== Early years ==
Tree was born in 1966 in Provo, Utah to Norman and Sallianne Tree. He is the 2nd oldest of 6 children. His father was a career Air Force fighter pilot who flew combat missions in Vietnam for a year. His family moved around frequently due to his father's demanding military career. The whole family lived in Southern France from 1977 to 1980 while his father was assigned as the U.S. Air Force exchange officer to the French Air Force Academy. While living in France he attended 6th through 8th grades at a local French middle school, and he's completely fluent in French. His family returned to the United States in 1980 where he attended three high schools over the following four years in California, Michigan, and Utah, graduating in 1984. He was active in the Boy Scouts of America, earning his Eagle Scout while in high school. He excelled academically as well as athletically, garnering varsity letters in swimming, diving, tennis, track, and cross-country. The U.S. Air Force Academy recruited him for Diving, and he enrolled there and subsequently competed as a diver in the NCAA Division One Western Athletic Conference (WAC).

== Education ==
- Bachelor of Science, United States Air Force Academy, Colorado Springs, Colorado (1990)
- Master of Business Administration, Chaminade University, Honolulu, Hawaii (1994)
- Squadron Officer School (1995)
- Master of Arts in Economics, University of Oklahoma, Oklahoma (1998)
- Air Command and Staff College (2001)
- Air War College (2005)
- Reserve Component National Security Course (2010)
- Advanced Joint Professional Military Education (AJPME) (2010)

== Military service ==
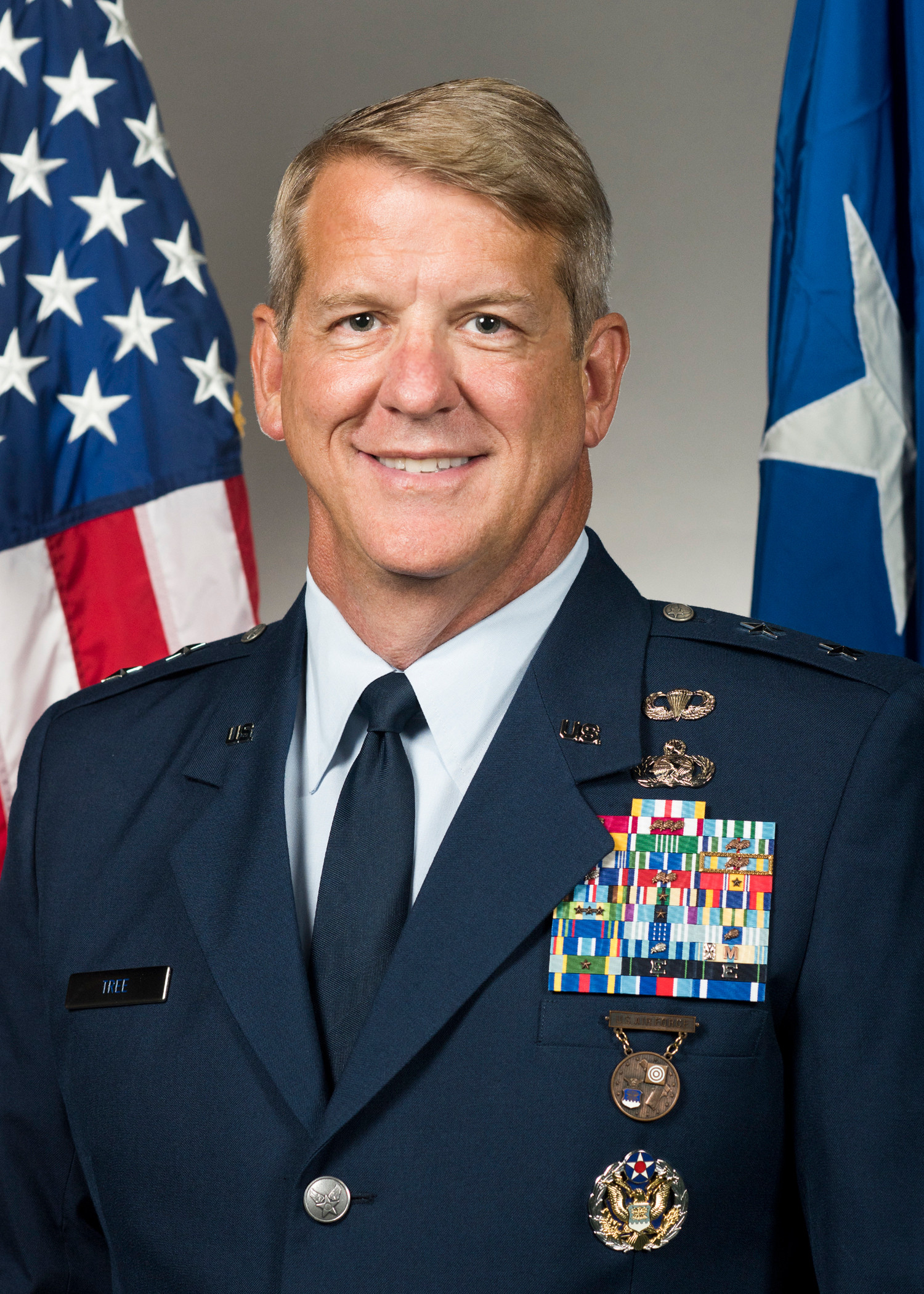
Tree in August 2021.

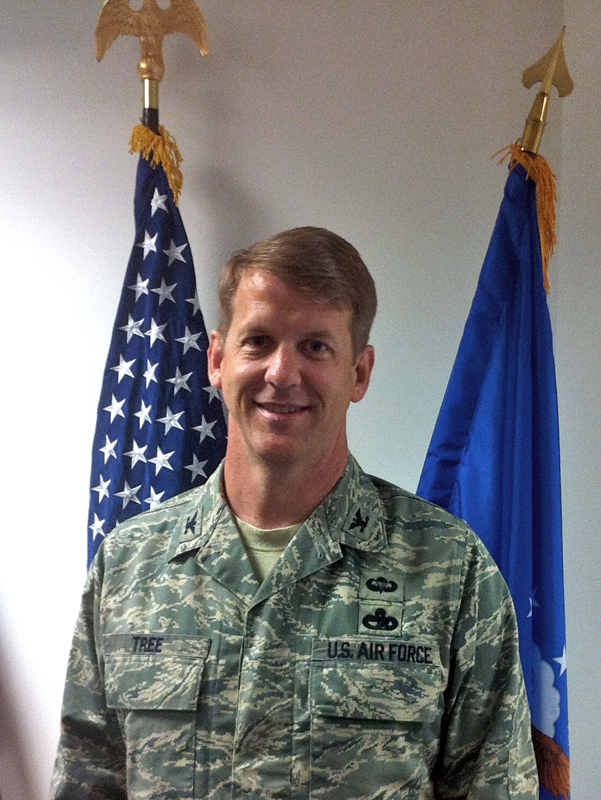
Colonel Tree at the Pentagon in Arlington, Virginia, Oct, 2011.

Following in his Dad's footsteps of lifelong military service, John attended the United States Air Force Academy, graduating in May, 1990. Entering active duty, his early assignments were in the fields of logistics and plans in three locations: California, Hawaii, and Italy. During these early years, then Lieutenant Tree deployed on 4 occasions (2 times each) to Guantanamo Bay, Cuba, and Port-au-Prince, Haiti. Given his fluency in both French and Haitian Creole, he was the lead linguist for the Joint Task Force responsible for returning Haitian migrants to Haiti and for Operation Uphold Democracy in 1994. He served as part of the United Nations Mission in Haiti, wearing the blue beret associated with the United Nations.

As a captain with seven years of full-time service in 1997, he separated from active duty and immediately became a member of the Air Force Reserve. He was soon promoted to major and became an acquisition officer at the Headquarters of Air Force Materiel Command at Wright-Patterson Air Force Base, Ohio. He worked on major Air Force programs and weapon systems that were critical to the nation's defense.

In 2004 he deployed to Headquarters United States European Command in Stuttgart, Germany for 5 months in support of the war on terror and Operation Enduring Freedom. He worked in the Headquarter's 24/7 European Plans and Operations Center (EPOC), coordinating and directing logistics support of the total war effort. For his exceptional service during this deployment he was awarded the Joint Service Commendation Medal and was later promoted to the rank of lieutenant colonel.

As a lieutenant colonel, Tree was appointed the commander of the 38th Aerial Port Squadron in Charleston Air Force Base, South Carolina. He led his squadron for three years, commanding a team of 215 men and women of the United States Air Force Reserve. During this period his squadron's Airmen were deployed on numerous occasions to combat zones in the middle east, including Iraq and Afghanistan.

He was promoted to the rank of full colonel in May, 2008 and was subsequently reassigned as the senior reservist to the Director of Global Channel Operations in the Tanker Airlift Control Center (TACC) at Scott Air Force Base, Illinois. He held this position for three years and was then assigned in March, 2011 as the senior reservist to the director of resource integration at the Headquarters, United States Air Force, the Pentagon, Washington D.C. The directorate is responsible for Air Force logistics, installations and mission support long-range planning, strategic support planning and associated policies. The directorate prepares, executes and manages programs totaling $21 billion annually for aircraft, missiles, munitions, equipment, vehicles, infrastructures and facilities. He served at the Pentagon until April 2015, followed by an assignment as the mobilization assistant to the commander of the Oklahoma City Air Logistics Complex, at Tinker AFB, Oklahoma, with $3B in revenue and over 9,000 employees. He was promoted to his Brigadier General on Dec 2, 2017, and he was nominated by the President to his current rank of Major General on March 5, 2021.

=== Military decorations and badges ===
Military awards and decorations
Defense Superior Service Medal
Legion of Merit
Meritorious Service Medal (with 3 Oak Leaf Clusters)
Joint Service Commendation Medal
Air Force Commendation Medal (with Oak Leaf Cluster)
Army Commendation Medal
Joint Service Achievement Medal (with 2 Oak Leaf Clusters)
Air Force Achievement Medal
Army Achievement Medal
Joint Meritorious Unit Award (with 2 Oak Leaf Clusters)
Outstanding Unit Award (with 5 Oak Leaf Clusters)
Organizational Excellence Award (with 2 Oak Leaf Clusters)
National Defense Service Medal (with one bronze Service Star)
Armed Forces Expeditionary Medal
Southwest Asia Service Medal with one bronze Service Star
Global War on Terrorism Service Medal
Armed Forces Service Medal with three bronze Service Stars
Humanitarian Service Medal (with service star)
Military Outstanding Volunteer Service Medal
Nuclear Deterrence Operations Service Medal
Air Force Overseas Short Tour Service Ribbon
Air Force Overseas Long Tour Service Ribbon (with Oak Leaf Cluster)
Air Force Expeditionary Service Ribbon
Air Force Longevity Service Award (with 6 Oak Leaf Clusters)
Armed Forces Reserve Medal (with bronze Mobilization Device and bronze Hourglass device)
Air Force Marksmanship Ribbon with one bronze Service Star
Navy Expert Rifle Marksmanship Medal
Navy Expert Pistol Marksmanship Medal
Air Force Training Ribbon
United Nations Medal (UNMIH) for Haiti
NATO Medal for the former Yugoslavia

Badges
Basic Parachutist Badge
Master Logistics Readiness Badge
Master Logistics Plans Badge
United States Pacific Command Badge
Headquarters Air Force badge
Bronze Elementary Excellence-in-Competition Pistol Badge
