= Jewish United Fund =

Central philanthropic address of Chicago's Jewish community

Jewish United Fund of Chicago
- Abbreviation: JUF
- Type: 501(c)(3) organization
- Tax ID no.: 36-2167034
- Purpose: Provides resources for food, refuge, health care, education, and emergency assistance
- Headquarters: Chicago, United States
- Affiliations: Jewish Federations of North America, Jewish Federation of Chicago
- Website: www.juf.org

The Jewish United Fund of Chicago (JUF) is the central philanthropic address of Chicago's Jewish community and one of the largest not-for-profit social welfare institutions in Illinois. JUF provides critical resources that bring food, refuge, health care, education and emergency assistance to 500,000 Chicagoans of all faiths and millions of Jews in Israel and around the world, funding a network of 100+ agencies, schools and initiatives.

== Allocations ==
National and Overseas—The Jewish United Fund of Chicago (JUF) conducts fundraising activities by means of annual calendar year campaigns and makes allocations/grants to the Jewish Federations of North America (JFNA) and the Jewish Federation of Chicago (JF). Through its allocation to JFNA, JUF supports services to nearly 2 million individuals in Israel and 71 other countries. These range from basic social service programs addressing needs of all age groups to formal and informal Jewish education/identity development. The major beneficiary organizations that engage in overseas work through support from JFNA are the American Jewish Joint Distribution Committee, The Jewish Agency for Israel and World ORT. (Russian: Общество Ремесленного Труда, Obchestvo Remeslenogo (pronounced: Remeslenava) Truda, "Association for the Promotion of Skilled Trades").

Community Relations—Through its support of the Jewish Community Relations Council (JCRC), JUF coordinates the collective policies and programs among 46 constituent Chicago-area Jewish organizations active in public affairs/community relations work. JCRC educates and mobilizes the Jewish community for action through JUF and those constituent groups on issues ranging from Israel to Darfur, and from combating anti-Semitism to the broad array of intergroup relations (interfaith, interethnic, etc.). JCRC activities and engagement takes place with the media, campuses, government, foreign diplomats, and religious and civic leaders.

One of Judaism's central tenets is the importance of passing traditions and teachings from generation to generation. JUF has a deep commitment to engaging the community's youth and inspiring their Jewish journeys, supporting a host of informal education and outreach experiences for young people that strengthen their Jewish identity and connections to community. In addition, JUF's TOV Volunteer Network provides hands-on volunteer opportunities for people of all ages to actively participate in tikkun olam, the repair of the world.
