= New Artists Alliance =

- Industry: Film
- Founded: 2007 in Los Angeles, California, US
- Founders: Gabriel Cowan; John Suits
- Headquarters: Los Angeles, California, US
- Key people: Gabriel Cowan (CEO)
- Services: Film production
- Website: naafilms.com

New Artists Alliance is an American independent film production company. It was founded in 2007 by Gabriel Cowan and John Suits, who met at film school. It focuses primarily on genre films. In order keep costs down, New Artists Alliance share profits with cast and crew, and they request more recognizable actors work for scale. In 2014, they signed a deal with XLrator Media to co-produce three pictures.

== Filmography ==
Year	Title	Ref
2008	Breathing Room	
2008	Flower in the Gun Barrel	
2009	Family of Four	
2010	Growth	
2012	Extracted	
2012	Static	
2013	Cheap Thrills	
2013	Bad Milo!	
2014	3 Nights in the Desert	
2014	The Scribbler	
2014	Just Before I Go	
2015	400 Days	
2016	Pandemic	
2016	The Turn	
