= Pandemic (film) =

- Theatrical release poster
- Directed by: John Suits
- Written by: Dustin T. Benson
- Produced by: Gabriel Cowan; John Suits
- Starring: Rachel Nichols; Alfie Allen; Paul Guilfoyle; Pat Healy; Danielle Rose Russell; Missi Pyle; Mekhi Phifer
- Cinematography: Mark Putnam
- Edited by: Nicholas Larrabure
- Music by: Alec Puro
- Production company: New Artists Alliance
- Distributed by: XLrator Media
- Release dates: February 26, 2016 (FrightFest Glasgow); April 1, 2016 (United States)
- Running time: 91 minutes
- Country: United States
- Language: English

Pandemic is a 2016 American science fiction thriller film directed by John Suits and written by Dustin T. Benson. Rachel Nichols stars as a doctor who leads a group to find survivors of a worldwide pandemic. The film is shot in a first-person point of view, similar to first-person shooter video games.

== Plot ==
A woman films happy moments of her daughter and husband's lives. After a montage, the same woman, in a cramped room, attempts to call her daughter Megan, who does not pick up. Her badge reads Dr. Lauren Chase.

Lauren is briefed by Doctor Greer, a member of the military. As a doctor, she must join an extraction team and administer tests to ensure that they do not bring back infected people to the military base. She is shown the different stages of infection for a mysterious illness, that escalate to level 5, extreme aggression.

Lauren meets the other members of her team, Wheeler, the driver, Denise, the navigator, and Gunner. They are being sent to find a group of uninfected people barricaded in a school. Denise tells Lauren that Gunner's wife was on the team that found the survivors there, and has been missing ever since. On their way there, the team finds the bus used by Gunner's wife's team, and he discovers her half-eaten corpse inside.

At the school, Lauren calls her daughter again. This time, she picks up, and says that she is at their house in the Los Angeles suburbs. Lauren promises to come get her. As they keep searching the school, they discover that the survivors are now infected. They chase the team, and Gunner sacrifices himself so the others can escape. Wheeler runs off and leaves Lauren and Denise behind.

The two women find shelter and bond over their children. Lauren brings up her conversation with her daughter, then reveals to Denise that she is not a doctor, but stole a doctor's badge. Her real name is Rebecca Thomas. Denise promises to help her find her daughter. They are then attacked by a level 5 infected, but are saved by Wheeler, who tells them he found another doctor in a nearby hospital. Since he did not believe that Wheeler worked for the military, he asks Rebecca to come convince him.

On their way to the hospital, they are attacked again and Denise is taken by a group of infected people. They take her under a bridge, where they cut her open and start eating her. Rebecca chases them off and kills one of them in a rage, until Wheeler manages to calm her down. At the hospital, he hotwires an ambulance to allow the group of survivors to escape, but the doctor knows that Rebecca is lying about her identity as he had met Lauren Chase before. He forces her and Wheeler out and drives off.

Wheeler finds them another vehicle, and they leave for the suburbs to find Rebecca's daughter. There, she finds Megan, who is infected but alive, and discovers her husband's corpse in the garage. Outside, Wheeler is attacked by a group of infected people. Rebecca takes off her suit and insists her daughter put it on. They manage to escape through a window, but Wheeler is badly injured, and urges Rebecca to leave him behind, which she does. When Rebecca and Megan reach the compound, a group of infected people are trying to get inside. Rebecca, carrying Megan, tries to approach, but the military assume she is attacking a doctor, as Megan is wearing her uniform, and shoot her. Despite Megan's signs of infection, Doctor Greer, believing her to be Lauren Chase, orders the soldiers to bring her inside and give her the treatment.

== Cast ==
- Rachel Nichols as Lauren Chase/Rebecca Thomas
- Alfie Allen as Wheeler
- Paul Guilfoyle as Doctor Greer
- Danielle Rose Russell as Megan Thomas
- Missi Pyle as Denise
- Mekhi Phifer as Gunner
- Pat Healy as Doctor Ward

== Production ==
Suits came upon the script, which was initially named Viral, at the Blood List, a repository of unproduced horror and thriller scripts. Suits does not consider the film to be found footage and instead says, "Rather than a found footage movie, I consider it more as a POV first-person movie." The camera setups were designed to simulate this first-person POV rather than someone who is carrying a camera. Suits said that they did not have a successful formula to follow for such a film, though he watched Maniac and Enter the Void for inspiration. Two camera operators, one female and one male, shot the film. The camera operator of the appropriate sex would substitute for whichever character's POV was represented.

Although he was a gamer in his youth, Suits said he could not find time to play many video games for research. Instead, he talked to gamer friends, watched YouTube videos, and discussed interesting kill scenes with the stunt coordinator.

== Release ==
Pandemic premiered at FrightFest Glasgow on February 26, 2016. It replaced Cell at the last moment. XLrator Media gave the film a limited release on April 1, 2016. It was released via video on demand on April 4, 2016.

== Reception ==
Despite some positive reviews the overall reception by critics was mostly negative. The aggregator site Rotten Tomatoes gives it a score of 44%, based on 16 reviews. The average rating was 4.80 out of 10.

Jonathan Hatfull of SciFiNow described it as "an energetic POV zombie action movie with some impressive action and less than impressive characterisation". Anton Bitel of Twitch Film called it "a thoroughly bleak portrait of rapid societal breakdown" that is also "a collection of genre clichés". Howard Gorman of Shock Till You Drop wrote, "Relying that much more on the narrative and players involved than POV 'gimmickry', Pandemic succeeds in keeping its audience invested and entertained." Dennis Harvey of Variety called it "a solid if not quite memorable entry in the ever-expanding canon of survivalist undead cinema". Justin Lowe of The Hollywood Reporter, in comparing it to Night of the Living Dead and other zombie films, said it shares similar themes but lacks the realism and gravitas. Martin Tsai of the Los Angeles Times wrote, "Pandemic proves serviceably frightening, if sporadically gory, maximizing tension derived from unknown dangers".
