= 400 Days (film) =

- Theatrical release poster
- Directed by: Matt Osterman
- Written by: Matt Osterman
- Produced by: Gabriel Cowan; John Suits
- Starring: Brandon Routh; Caity Lotz; Ben Feldman; Dane Cook
- Cinematography: Bo Hakala
- Edited by: Nicholas Larrabure
- Music by: Wojciech Golczewski; Sean McMahon
- Production companies: New Artists Alliance; XLrator Media
- Distributed by: XLrator Media
- Release dates: October 29, 2015 (Australia); January 12, 2016
- Running time: 90 minutes
- Country: United States
- Language: English

400 Days is a 2015 American science fiction film written and directed by Matt Osterman and starring Brandon Routh, Caity Lotz, Ben Feldman, and Dane Cook (also serving as executive producer) as astronauts sent on a 400-day-long simulated mission to a distant planet, to test the psychological effects of deep space travel. In the United States, the film premiered in theaters, on-demand, and digitally on January 12, 2016.

== Plot ==
Four astronauts – Captain Theo Cooper, Dr. Emily McTier, Bug Kieslowski, and Cole Dvorak – begin a 400-day-long simulation on Earth intended to study the long-term effects of space travel.

As their time underground grinds on, the crew begins to deal with extreme psychological effects like paranoia and hallucination. The team settles deeper into their separate spaces, until a disheveled man finds his way into their simulated space ship. After his escape, the crew decides to exit and explore the surface world, which they discover is now dark, windy, desolate, forbidding, and covered with dust.

After a long walk with minor incidents, they discover the town "Tranquillity", which is inhabited and has electricity. A man named Zell invites them into his diner and tells them the moon had been struck by something which created an enormous dust cloud now covering the Earth, blocking the sun.

Dvorak scoffs at this suggestion, still believing they are in a simulation, and leaves to go to the local bar, followed by the rest of the crew. After a few drinks, Dvorak leaves the bar with a young woman without telling the others. The other three return to the diner, where Zell has offered them a place to sleep.

Bug takes first watch duty and soon begins hallucinating that he follows his son Sam but stomps across Zell, where the scene ends. Soon, McTier and Cooper wake up alone. When they ask Zell about their missing friends, he insists that Cooper and McTier arrived alone. Suspecting danger, the pair leaves the diner and unsuccessfully looks for their friends.

The pair returns to the ship and, as Cooper closes the entrance hatch, he discovers that they were being followed by Zell and two other men. Cooper and McTier manage to neutralize their attackers.

The very moment Zell dies, the 400 days have just passed, and they are informed that the simulation has ended with great success. The entrance hatch opens, and bright light shines down. Cooper and McTier grab each other's hands and anxiously await what happens next, but the film ends without showing that.

== Cast ==
- Brandon Routh as Captain Theo Cooper
- Caity Lotz as Dr. Emily McTier
- Ben Feldman as Bug Kieslowski
- Dane Cook as Cole Dvorak
- Tom Cavanagh as Zell
- Grant Bowler as Walter Anderson
- Sally Pressman as Darla
- Fernanda Romero as Zia
- Frank Ashmore as Garcia
- Dominic Bogart as Sketch

== Production ==
400 Days is the second film directed by Matt Osterman, who also wrote the screenplay. The film draws inspiration from an experiment called MARS-500 (China National Space Administration, European Space Agency and Roscosmos State Corporation), as well as The Twilight Zone, classic science fiction, and puzzle films.

Osterman, in his director's statement, explained that

it was my intention to create a narrative that put the viewer in the seat of the experiment itself—one where the audience was never quite sure of whom to trust and unsure if it was all just an elaborate ruse. The puzzle aspect of the movie will be challenging to some, but I wanted to echo Rod Serling and trust in the idea that it's okay for the audience to not have all the answers—to be comfortable with the unknown.

Production started in June 2014, and was shot over a period of 19 days in several locations throughout Southern California.

== Release ==
Distribution of 400 Days was handled by XLrator Media as well as Syfy films, the latter for which the movie served as an inaugural release for the studio. The film was screened at the Mall of America on January 15, 2016, as a part of the Twin Cities Film Fest insider series.

== Reception ==
Rotten Tomatoes, a review aggregator, reports that one of eight surveyed critics (13%) gave the film a positive review; the average rating is 3.9/10. Den of Geek rated it 2.5/5 stars and wrote that the story should have focused more on the intriguing premise of testing neurotic astronauts in a simulation. Michael Rechtshaffen of the Los Angeles Times criticized the film's story as not living up to the intriguing premise and wrote, "Lacking a viable exit strategy, the tension-free 400 Days feels like wasted time." Leslie Felperin of The Guardian rated it 2/5 stars and wrote that the stock characters and predictable backstories make it seem "like watching Solaris performed by sock puppets".
