= Skin-walker (disambiguation) =

Skin-walker is a human/animal shape-shifter from Native American legend.

Skinwalker may also refer to:

- Skinwalkers (novel), a 1986 mystery novel by Tony Hillerman
  - Skinwalkers (2002 film), a PBS Mystery! episode based on Hillerman's novel
- Skinwalker (comics), a 2003 comic book published by Nunzio DeFilippis, Christina Weir, and Brian Hurtt
- Skinwalkers (2007 film), a werewolf film starring Jason Behr
- Skinwalker (2021 film), an American Western thriller film
- "Skinwalker" (Smallville), a 2002 episode of Smallville
- Skinwalker: Curse of the Shaman, a 2005 film released by Anchor Bay Entertainment
- Skinwalker, a 2009 urban fantasy novel by Faith Hunter

== See also ==
- Skinwalker Ranch, a ranch in the Uintah Basin of Utah
