= The Scribbler (film) =

2014 film directed by John Suits

- Release poster
- Directed by: John Suits
- Written by: Daniel Schaffer
- Based on: The Scribbler by Daniel Schaffer
- Produced by: Gabriel Cowan; Ken F. Levin
- Starring: Katie Cassidy; Garret Dillahunt; Michelle Trachtenberg; Michael Imperioli; Gina Gershon; Sasha Grey; Kunal Nayyar; Ashlynn Yennie; Eliza Dushku; Billy Campbell
- Cinematography: Mark Putnam
- Edited by: Mark Lowrie
- Music by: Alec Puro
- Production companies: Caliber Media Company; New Artists Alliance
- Distributed by: XLrator Media
- Release dates: March 1, 2014 (Glasgow Fright Fest); September 19, 2014 (United States)
- Running time: 89 minutes
- Country: United States
- Language: English

The Scribbler is a 2014 American independent science fiction thriller film directed by John Suits and written by Daniel Schaffer, based on his own graphic novel of same name. The film stars Katie Cassidy, Garret Dillahunt, Michelle Trachtenberg (in her final film role before her death in 2025), Michael Imperioli, Gina Gershon, Sasha Grey, Kunal Nayyar, Ashlynn Yennie, Eliza Dushku, and Billy Campbell.

== Plot ==
Suki, a young woman suffering from dissociative identity disorder, moves into Juniper Tower, a strange, darkly gothic apartment building, that serves as a halfway house for mental patients who don't need to be institutionalized any longer, but are not completely cured yet. Suki has been given an experimental device that lets her perform a procedure known as The Siamese Burn on herself. The machine is supposed to "burn" all her extra personalities until she only has one left.

At Juniper Tower, Suki reconnects with her friend with benefits Hogan, a man who may fake depression so that he can stay there as the "rooster of the henhouse". She also meets several female tenants and learns that Hogan has slept with most of them. One by one, the girls are found dead from apparent suicide.

Suki soon realizes that the girls have actually been murdered, and is worried that one of her multiple personalities is responsible. She keeps using the "Siamese Burn" to delete them, but the machine has been heavily modified, which leads Suki to believe that one of her personas, the one that committed the crimes, is trying to keep Suki from getting rid of her. She suspects the mysterious "Scribbler", a super-powered being who communicates with her by scribbling messages backwards.

Suki finally understands that the Scribbler has really been trying to help her solve the murders, and embraces her alter ego in order to fight the real killer, Alice, an escaped mental patient who's been hiding at Juniper Tower. Alice turns out to be the evil personality of Veronica, a young woman who unsuccessfully used the "Siamese Burn" to remove her. After the Scribbler overpowers Alice, Veronica commits suicide.

Later that night, Suki is interrogated by Detective Moss, who believes she committed all the murders, and Doctor Silk, who's hoping to figure out what really happened. During the interrogation, Hogan creates a distraction, and Suki uses the Scribbler's supernatural abilities to escape.

== Cast ==
- Katie Cassidy as Suki
- Garret Dillahunt as Hogan
- Michelle Trachtenberg as Alice/Veronica
- Eliza Dushku as Criminal Psychologist Jennifer Silk
- Michael Imperioli as Detective Moss
- Billy Campbell as Sinclair
- Gina Gershon as Cleo
- Sasha Grey as Bunny
- Kunal Nayyar as Karem
- Ashlynn Yennie as Emily
- T.V. Carpio as Satomi
- Richard Riehle as Officer O'Reilly
- Sara Tomko as Psychiatric Nurse Langdon
- Michael Berry Jr. as Hogan (Dog) Voice
- Sir Hollywood as Hogan (Dog)
- Luke Barnett as Orderly
- Brad Culver as Officer

== Production ==
Filming began in May 2012 in Los Angeles at Linda Vista Community Hospital.

== Release ==
The Scribbler premiered at the Glasgow FrightFest on March 1, 2014. It was released on DVD and Blu-ray on October 21, 2014.

== Reception ==
Rotten Tomatoes, a review aggregator, reports that 50% of 12 surveyed critics gave the film a positive review; the average rating is 5.7/10. Metacritic rated it 27/100 based on six reviews. Geoff Berkshire of Variety likened it to Sucker Punch as if it were made by The Asylum. Frank Scheck of The Hollywood Reporter wrote, "Although ultimately far too muddled in its concept and execution to be anything more than a curiosity, The Scribbler does manage the dubious feat of being one of the strangest films you're likely to see this year." Film Journal International wrote, "With its endless edginess and unhealthy obsession with madness at its most flamboyant, The Scribbler strains to be a cult film, but even the most diehard lovers of cinema strangeness may find it ultimately too nonsensical and needlessly overwrought." Gary Goldstein of the Los Angeles Times wrote, "Director John Suits seems more concerned with plying eyeballs with creepy atmospherics, showy visual effects and sexy interludes than with propulsive pacing or roiling tension." Mark Rabinowitz of Paste wrote, "The Scribbler is overwrought, absurd, occasionally exploitative, completely lacking in subplot, takes a good 20–25 minutes to really get going and has acting that varies from excellent to, well, less-than-excellent. It's also hugely fun!" Jess Hicks of Bloody Disgusting rated it 4/5 stars and wrote, "The Scribbler is a great example of how you don't need a few million dollars to make an entertaining superhero movie." Scott Hallam of Dread Central rated it 3/5 stars and wrote, "The Scribbler is entertaining and has plenty of action to keep viewers interested. If you can handle an ending that feels like an afterthought, then you'll dig this one."
