= Richard Riehle =

American actor (1948–2026)

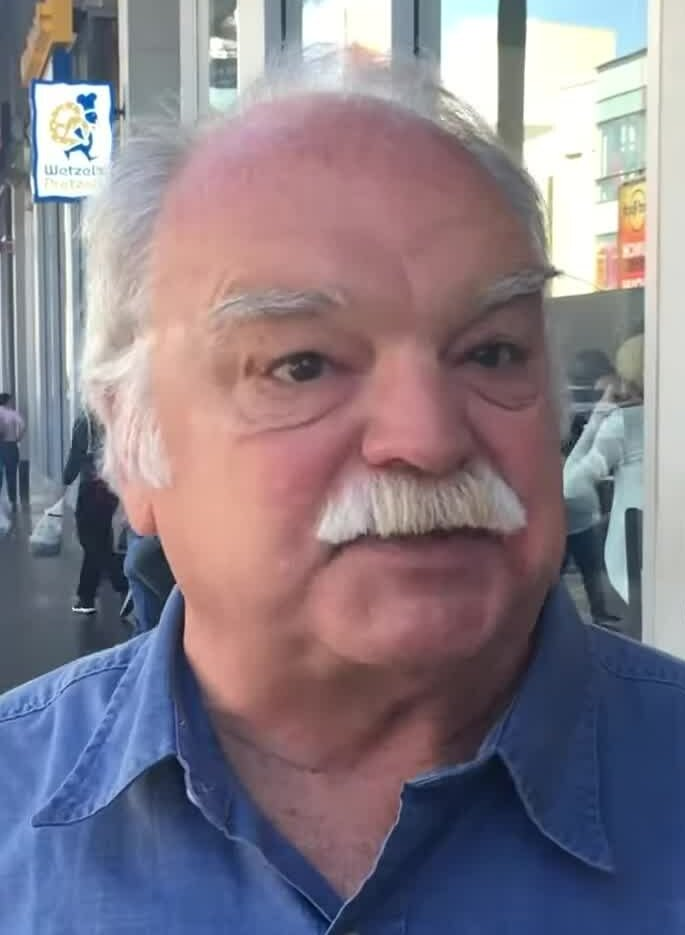
- Riehle in April 2016
- Born: May 12, 1948; Menomonee Falls, Wisconsin, U.S.
- Died: October 15, 2026 (aged 78); Los Angeles, California, U.S.
- Education: University of Notre Dame (BA); University of Minnesota (MFA)
- Occupation: Actor
- Years active: 1975–2026

Richard Riehle (May 12, 1948 – October 15, 2026) was an American character actor, best known for playing Tom Smykowski in Office Space (1999) and Walt Finnerty on Grounded for Life (2001–2005). He appeared in over 400 films, television shows and other projects.

== Personal life ==
Riehle was born in Menomonee Falls, Wisconsin, on May 12, 1948, He had six siblings. Riehle graduated in 1970 from the University of Notre Dame and then completed an MFA at University of Minnesota.

Riehle died at the Beverly Hills Rehabilitation Centre on October 16, 2026, from a stroke complicated by oropharyngeal cancer, at the age of 78.

== Career ==
Riehle began acting at the Meadow Brook Theatre in Rochester, Michigan, and was doing regional theatre in the Pacific Northwest when he appeared in the John Wayne film Rooster Cogburn. Riehle portrayed Santa Claus in eight different projects: five films, two television shows, and a television movie.

On television, Riehle portrayed Walt Finnerty on Grounded for Life (2001–2005). He also had multiple appearances across the Star Trek franchise, the role of Batai in The Next Generation episode "The Inner Light", Star Trek: Voyager as Seamus Driscol in two episodes, and Star Trek: Enterprise as Dr. Jeremy Lucas in two episodes. Riehle also had guest roles on shows like NCIS, The Middle, and The West Wing. He appeared in the made-for-TV movie The Other Side of Hell (1978), My Two Dads (1989), Dragnet (1989) and Falcon Crest (1989). In 2007, Riehle guest starred on The Young and the Restless as Warden McQueen.

In film, Riehle played Tom Smykowski, the self-described "people person" who serves as an intermediary between the engineers and customers at the software company Initech in Office Space. His other roles include the ranch hand Carlson in Of Mice and Men (1992), the guard who allowed Harrison Ford to escape custody in The Fugitive (1993), Principal Beasely in the Pauly Shore comedy Jury Duty (1995), Executive Decision (1996), Mercury Rising (1998), Deuce Bigalow: Male Gigolo (1999), Wedding Crashers (2005), and The Secret Village. He portrayed Santa Claus in the Netflix film Puppy Star Christmas (2018). His last film credit was in 2026, in The Cowboy Killer.

Riehle performed on Broadway in 1986's Execution of Justice, in the 1999 Tony award-nominated revival of The Iceman Cometh, and in a 2002 revival of The Man Who Had All the Luck. In February 1989, he was in John Guare's comedy Moon Over Miami which opened at the Yale Repertory Theater in New Haven, Connecticut.

== Filmography ==
=== Film ===
Year	Title	Role	Notes
1975	Rooster Cogburn	Uncredited extra	
1977	Joyride	The Bartender	
1987	Rachel River	Mervyn "Merv"	
1989	Black Rain	Internal Affairs Detective Crown	
1989	Glory	Kendric, The Quartermaster	
1991	Shadows and Fog	Roustabout	
1991	Fried Green Tomatoes	Reverend Scroggins	
1992	Prelude to a Kiss	Jerry Blier	
1992	The Public Eye	Officer O'Brien	
1992	Of Mice and Men	Carlson	
1992	Hero	Robinson	
1993	Body of Evidence	Detective Griffin	
1993	Free Willy	Wade	
1993	The Fugitive	Old Guard	
1993	A Dangerous Woman	John, Drycleaner Owner	
1994	Iron Will	Burton	
1994	Lightning Jack	Marcus	
1994	Holy Matrimony	Greeson	
1995	Casino	Charlie Clark	
1995	Stuart Saves His Family	Judge	
1995	Jury Duty	Principal Beasley	
1995	Dominion	Larry	
1995	Killer: A Journal of Murder	Warden Quince	
1995	Lone Justice 2	The Mayor	
1996	Executive Decision	Air Marshal George Edwards	
1996	Too Fast Too Young	Sergeant	
1996	The Fan	Shopkeeper	
1996	Driven	Leo	
1996	Last Resort	Phil Billingsley	
1996	Ghosts of Mississippi	Tommy Mayfield	
1997	Trading Favors	Highway Patrolman	
1997	One Eight Seven	Walter	
1997	Cold Night Into Dawn	Gerald	
1997	One of Our Own	Burt Herchak	
1997	A River Made to Drown In	Heavyset Man	
1997	Dilemma	Captain Ross	
1998	Desperate Measures	Warden Ed Fayne	
1998	Mercury Rising	Edgar Halstrom	
1998	The Odd Couple II	The Sheriff	
1998	Fear and Loathing in Las Vegas	Dune Buggy Driver	Cameo
1998	Lethal Weapon 4	Coast Guard Officer	
1998	The Lesser Evil	Detective Smitts	
1998	Judas Kiss	Security Guard	
1998	Richie Rich's Christmas Wish	Sergeant Mooney	
1998	Mighty Joe Young	Commander Gorman	
1999	The Arrangement	Detective Bert Hershak	
1999	Kill the Man	Mr. Ellias	
1999	Office Space	Tom Smykowski	
1999	Blink of an Eye	Main Prison Guard	
1999	Deuce Bigalow: Male Gigolo	Bob Bigalow	
2001	The Fluffer	Sam Martins	
2001	Say It Isn't So	Sheriff Merle Hobbs	
2001	Crash Point Zero	Alan Douglas	
2001	Joe Dirt	Car Dealer	
2001	Bandits	Lawrence Fife	
2001	The Socratic Method	Professor Myers	
2001	The Gristle	Starnes	
2002	Ken Park	"Murph" Murphy	
2002	Time Changer	Dr. Wiseman	
2003	The Hebrew Hammer	Santa Claus	
2003	Beethoven's 5th	Vaughn Carter	
2004	Death and Texas	Prison Warden	
2004	Home on the Range	Sheriff Sam Brown	Voice
2004	Palindromes	Dr. Dan	
2004	Mysterious Skin	Charlie	
2005	Neo Ned	Officer Pendleton	
2005	The Mostly Unfabulous Social Life of Ethan Green	Hat Sister	
2005	Wedding Crashers	Funeral Guest	Uncredited
2005	The 12 Dogs of Christmas	Mayor Nobel Doyle	
2006	The Lost	Bill Richmond	
2006	Intellectual Property	Detective Rees	
2006	Hot Tamale	Sheriff Pinkham	
2006	Hatchet	Jim Permatteo	
2006	The Beach Party at the Threshold of Hell	The Narrator, Paranormal Historian	
2006	Down the P.C.H.	Ricky	
2006	National Lampoon's Dorm Daze 2	Captain Bunkley	
2006	Little Big Top	Bob	
2006	The Darkroom	Emilio	
2006	Price to Pay	Hooper	
2006	Midnight Clear	Tommy	
2006	Fierce Friend	Phone Tech	
2006	Domestic Import	Sam, The Mailman	
2007	Smiley Face	Mr. Spencer	
2007	The Memory Thief	Judaica Store Clerk	
2007	Choose Connor	Grant Miller	
2007	The Man from Earth	Dr. Will Gruber	
2007	Spinning into Butter	Paul Meyers	
2007	My Father	John Parker	
2007	A Plumm Summer	Art Bublin	
2007	Wasting Away	Colonel South	
2007	Resurrection Mary	Detective Mahoney	
2007	Big Stan	Judge	
2007	Desperate Escape	Croaker Norge	
2008	The Last Word	Man At Gorge	
2008	Red	Sam Berry	
2008	Hindsight	Peter	
2008	The Temerity of Zim	Mr. Brown	Short film
2008	Green Flash	Herb	
2008	Your Name Here	Literary Agent Lipschitz	
2008	Audie & the Wolf	Michael Ludlow	
2008	Bait Shop	Gus	
2008	Necessary Evil	Captain Parsons	
2009	Stellina Blue	Dr. Helfenstein	
2009	Nowhere to Hide	Toley	
2009	Messengers 2: The Scarecrow	Jude Weatherby	
2009	Project Solitude	Frederick Sterling	
2009	Halloween II	Buddy, The Night Watchman	
2009	Play Dead	Truck Driver	
2009	The Last Lovecraft: Relic of Cthulhu	Mr. Snodgrass	
2010	Growth	Larkin Holberman	
2010	5 Star Day	Jim, The Plumber	
2010	Spork	Clyde	
2010	BoyBand	Principal Collins	
2010	Miss Nobody	Leonard Ormsby	
2010	Screwball: The Ted Whitfield Story	Joe Francia, The Umpire	
2010	1,001 Ways to Enjoy the Missionary Position	Charlie	
2010	The Search for Santa Paws	Santa Claus	
2010	Lights Out	Harold	
2010	Killer by Nature	Warden Upton	
2010	Darnell Dawkins: Mouth Guitar Legend	Hal "Howlin' Hal" Halsby	
2011	The Back-up Bride	Sonny Spur	
2011	Bridesmaids	Bill Cozbi	
2011	Judy Moody and the Not Bummer Summer	The Ringmaster	
2011	Chillerama	Cecil Kaufman	Segment: "Zom-B-Movie"
2011	A Very Harold & Kumar 3D Christmas	Santa Claus	
2011	Black Velvet	The Sheriff	
2011	Finding Hope	Sheriff Avery	Short film
2012	Treasure Buddies	Thomas Howard	
2012	Extracted	Father Riley	
2012	Waterwalk	Jim T.	
2012	FDR: American Badass!	Senator Bronson	
2012	Last Call	Harold	
2012	Bad Ass	Father Miller	
2012	The Watermen	Belvin Lee Smith	
2012	3 Days of Normal	Chief Dale Nickens	
2012	Stitch in Time	Norman Stitch	
2012	Dead Man's Burden	Hank "Three Penny Hank"	
2012	BearCity 2: The Proposal	Gabe	
2012	Breathless	Deputy Cole	
2013	Texas Chainsaw 3D	Farnsworth	
2013	Blue Dream	Ted Sellers	
2013	Lonely Boy	Mr. Fitz	
2013	Girl Meets Boy	Raymond	
2013	Lionhead	Bronowitz, The Lawyer	
2013	The Secret Village	Paul	
2013	Coffee, Kill Boss	Vincent Brutsi	
2013	Mischief Night	The Trucker	
2013	Friend Request	Frank	
2013	Munchausen	The Doctor	Short film
2014	The Scribbler	Officer O'Reilly	
2014	There's Always Woodstock	Mr. Harmon	
2014	Gone Doggy Gone	Stan Janson	
2014	In Your Eyes	Mr. Padgham	
2014	Lovesick	The Father	
2014	Friended to Death	Dan	
2014	The Cabining	"Sarge"	
2014	Transformers: Age of Extinction	The Landlord	
2014	One Week Vacation	Kevin Winters	Short film
2014	The Turtle's Head	Detective Bing Shooster	Short film
2014	The Three Dogateers	Santa	
2014	Pilot Error	Roy Grimm	
2015	Amnesiac	The Postman	
2015	Primrose Lane	Officer Braggs	
2015	Roommate Wanted	Dr. Hoffman	
2015	Larry Gaye: Renegade Male Flight Attendant	The Bartender	
2015	Contracted: Phase II	"Deuce" Gelman	
2015	Daddy	Al Rubin	
2015	Sex, Death and Bowling	Father Joe	
2015	Helen Keller vs. Nightwolves	Sheriff Ryan	
2015	Dementia	Sam	
2015	Jimmy's Jungle	Grandpa Bell	
2016	Pee-wee's Big Holiday	Dan	
2016	Fear, Inc.	Bill	
2016	Medal of Victory	Ted Crump	
2016	Citrus Springs	George	
2016	Last Man Club	Grady	
2016	Heels	Calvin Lackey	
2016	Schlep	Uncle Bill	
2017	Miyubi	Grandfather	Short film
2017	Swing State	Tom Fleischman	
2017	Breaking Legs	Principal Bater	
2017	Nowhere, Michigan	Martin	
2017	Pitching Tents	Grandpa	
2017	20 Weeks	Keenan	
2017	You Have a Nice Flight	Bob	
2017	The Meanest Man in Texas	Mr. Kilpatrick	
2017	Aquarians	Father Rob	
2017	Golden Vanity	The Radio Announcer	
2017	Delight in the Mountain	Judge George Hinton	
2018	Bad Apples	Principal Dale	
2018	For the Hits	Grandpa George	
2018	Bullitt County	The Mister	
2018	Hyde Park	Clarence Potts	
2018	Fishbowl California	Glen	
2018	PawParazzi	Bobby	
2018	West of Hell	Mr. Braxton	
2018	Living Room Coffin	Nate	
2018	The Invisible Mother	Archie	
2018	Randy's Canvas	Professor Hausdorff	
2018	The Acorn	Mr. Ives	Short film
2018	Puppy Star Christmas	Santa Claus	
2019	Limbo	Phil	
2019	Chase	Turley	
2019	15 Minutes at 400 Degrees	John	Short film
2019	3 from Hell	Sheriff Wolfe	
2019	The Incredible Enzo	The Magician	Short film
2019	What's Buried in the Backyard	Allen Palms	
2019	Made Vicious	Lawyer Justice	
2021	Destination Marfa	"Skeeter"	DVD, Amazon, and VUDU

=== Television ===
Year	Title	Role	Notes
1978	The Other Side of Hell	Tattooed Man	Television film
1989	My Two Dads	Ed Steinbauer Jr.	Episode: "Say Goodnight, Gracie"
1989	Dragnet	Oliver Brady	Episode: "Nouveau Gypsies"
1989	Falcon Crest	George Beeker	Episode: "Payback"
1989	Cross of Fire	Duvall	Television film
1989	Cast the First Stone	Dickson	Television film
1989–1990	Quantum Leap	Clifford Vargas, Lieutenant Lannon	2 episodes
1989, 1992	Murder, She Wrote	Sergeant Devon O'Malley, Aaron	2 episodes
1989–1993	L.A. Law	Roger Beekman, Edmund Clancy	3 episodes
1990	Nasty Boys	Gardner	Episode: "The Good, the Bad, and the Nasty"
1990	His & Hers	Mr. Mueller	Episode: "Dueling Therapists"
1990	People Like Us	Anthony Feliciano	Television film
1990	Broken Badges	Unknown Character	Episode: "Pilot"
1990–1991	Ferris Bueller	Principal Ed Rooney	13 episodes
1991	Father Dowling Mysteries	L.A. Detective Miller	Episode: "The Malibu Mystery"
1991	The Golden Girls	Detective Parres	Episode: "Never Yell Fire in a Crowded Retirement Home: Part 1"
1991	Keeper of the City	Captain Walder	Television film
1992	Civil Wars	Richard Sturdevant	Episode: "Whippet 'Til It Breaks"
1992	Roseanne	Mr. Evans	Episode: "Lies"
1992	Star Trek: The Next Generation	Batai	Episode: "The Inner Light"
1992	On the Air	Dr. Winky	2 episodes
1993	For Their Own Good	Dave Butler	Television film
1993	Shaky Ground	Henry McCallister	Episode: "Love Thy Neighbor]"
1993	Sirens	Irving Chattle	Episode: "Keeping the Peace"
1993	Ned Blessing: The True Story of My Life	Judge Longley	4 episodes
1993	Perry Mason: The Case of the Killer Kiss	Mort Aberdine	Television film
1994	Shadow of Obsession	Applegate	Television film
1994	Gambler V: Playing for Keeps	Frank DiMaio	Television film
1995	Get Smart	Mr. Winters	Episode: "Pilot"
1995	Trial by Fire	Fred Cobb	Television film
1995	Too Something	Unknown Character	Episode: "The Candidate"
1996	The Client	Sergeant Phil Rucker	Episode: "Motherless Child"
1996	Terminal	Security Chief	Television film
1996	Murder One	Pat Ferguson	Episode: "Chapter Twenty-Three"
1996	Kirk	Dr. Arthur Bacanovic	2 episodes
1996	The Single Guy	Mr. Van Wagner	Episode: "Best Man"
1996, 1999	Diagnosis: Murder	Deputy Sheriff Harmon Tolliver, Dustin Woods	2 episodes
1997	Men Behaving Badly	Stranger	Episode: "The Odds Couple"
1997	High Incident	Roy	Episode: "Knock, Knock"
1997	Perversions of Science	Gorn	Episode: "People's Choice"
1997	Ally McBeal	Jack Billings	2 episodes
1997	The Visitor	Principal Shinagel	Episode: "Fear of Flying"
1997	The Practice	Mr. Holt	Episode: "Sex, Lies, and Monkeys"
1997	Murder, She Wrote: South by Southwest	Jack Ogden	Television film
1998	Brooklyn South	Donald Jarman	Episode: "Tears on My Willow"
1998	The Pretender	Graham Hawkes	Episode: "Indy Show"
1998	The Pentagon Wars	General Vice	Television film
1998	Buffy the Vampire Slayer	Merrick	Episode: "Becoming: Part 1"
1998	When the Bough Breaks II: Perfect Prey	Detective Bevlan	Television film
1998	The Ransom of Red Chief	The Narrator, Sheriff "T-Bone" Yankum	Television film
1998	Mr. Murder	John Wexel	Television film
1998	Chicago Hope	Milo Schwarz	Episode: "Sarindipity"
1998	Maggie	The Frog	Voice, episode: "The Greatest Story Ever Toad"
1998	Home Improvement	Detective Roberts	Episode: "Bewitched"
1998	Route 9	Agent Wallace	Television film
1998, 2001	Columbo	Sergeant Degarmo	2 episodes
1999	Hard Time: The Premonition	Captain Waters	Television film
1999	Au Pair	Sam Morgan	Television film
1999	Hard Time: Hostage Hotel	Captain Waters	Television film
2000	Star Trek: Voyager	Seamus Driscol	2 episodes
2000	City of Angels	Dr. Whitney	Episode: "Ax and You Shall Receive"
2000	Providence	Simon, Inspector	Episode: "The Storm"
2000	Sabrina, the Teenage Witch	Jedediah	Episode: "The Wild, Wild Witch"
2000	Any Day Now	Unknown Character	Episode: "Nothing Personal"
2001	The West Wing	Officer Jack Sloan	2 episodes
2001–2005	Grounded for Life	Walt Finnerty	45 episodes
2002	The Laramie Project	Henderson Trial Judge	Television film
2002	ER	Mandrake Patient	Episode: "A Hopeless Wound"
2002	Another Pretty Face	Hilton March	Television film
2003	Fillmore!	Leo Grant	Voice, episode: "Masterstroke of Malevolence"
2003	Tremors	Helmut Krause	Episode: "The Key"
2003	Monster Makers	Detective Brennan	Television film
2003–2004	Married to the Kellys	Uncle Dave	10 episodes
2004	MNTSB: The Crash of Flight 323	Ernie Wilson	Television film
2004	Star Trek: Enterprise	Dr. Jeremy Lucas	2 episodes
2005	Detective	Father Uxbridge	Television film
2005	Boston Legal	Dr. Barry Glouberman	Episode: "The Ass Fat Jungle"
2006	George Lopez	Eddie Carter	Episode: "It's a Cliffhanger, by George"
2006	All of Us	Sergeant Nelson	Episode: "Police... Open Up"
2007	7th Heaven	Crossroads Mayor	Episode: "Inked"
2007	American Body Shop	Bishop Thomas K. O'Banyon	Episode: "The Bishop and the Pawn"
2007	The Young and the Restless	Warden McQueen	10 episodes
2008	Our First Christmas	Santa	Television film
2008–2011	Poor Paul	Grandpa Paul, Big Chief Malcolm Roaring Boar	10 episodes
2009	Psych	Army Johnson	Episode: "Earth, Wind and... Wait for It"
2009	Better Off Ted	Bob	Episode: "Get Happy"
2010	Funny or Die Presents	Jerry, The Mayor	Episode: "Episode Five"
2010–2011	Nick Swardson's Pretend Time	Ellen's Grandfather, The Mayor	2 episodes
2011	Kickin' It	Mr. Coburn	Episode: "The Great Escape"
2012	Lake Effects	Chairman McCarren	Television film
2012	The Client List	Jim Richardson	Episode: "Games People Play"
2012	Men at Work	Gus	Episode: "Wake and Bake"
2012	The League	Santa Claus	Episode: "A Krampus Carol"
2013	The Mindy Project	George Menken	Episode: "Mindy's Brother"
2013	Modern Family	Norman	Episode: "The Future Dunphys"
2013	Mob City	Sergeant Kuzyk	Episode: "Red Light"
2013–2014	The Legend of Korra	Bumi, Additional Voices	Voice, 17 episodes
2013, 2018	Drunk History	James Roche, Ralph Himmelsbach	2 episodes
2014	Maron	David Anthony Sr.	Episode: "The Mom Situation"
2014	Comedy Bang! Bang!	Umpire Bill Kessel	Episode: "Nick Offerman Wears a Green Flannel Shirt & Brown Boots"
2014	Mystery Girls	Walt	Episode: "Haunted House Party"
2014	Mom	John	Episode: "Chicken Nuggets and a Triple Homicide"
2014	Two and a Half Men	Santa	Episode: "Family, Bublé, Deep-Fried Turkey"
2015	Black-ish	Solomon	Episode: "Big Night, Big Fight"
2015	The Soul Man	Larry	Episode: "Tell It Like It Isn't"
2015	Axe Cop	Science Corp Scientist, Secret President Larry, Tutukaka Male	Voice, 2 episodes
2015, 2017	NCIS	Walt Osorio	2 episodes
2016	Major Crimes	Mr. Lutz	Episode: "Skin Deep"
2016	The Real O'Neals	Father Bernard	Episode: "The Real Move"
2016–2018	The Middle	Sheriff Dugan	Various Episode: "Roadkill"
2017	Love at First Glance	Wally Moore	Television film
2017	Real Rob	Kyle	Episode: "Priorities"
2017	Superior Donuts	Murray	Episode: "Flour Power"
2017	Mr. Student Body President	Principal	Episode: "Last Year"
2017	In the Rough	Duke "Chopper" McNeil	7 episodes
2018	Another Period	Congressman	Episode: "Congress"
2018	Corporate	Hubert	Episode: "Society Tomorrow"
2018	A Very Nutty Christmas	Dosselmeyer	Television film
2019	Now Apocalypse	Neil	Episode: "The Downward Spiral"
2019	American Housewife	Gerald	Episode: "Field Trippin'"
2020	Fuller House	Uncle Monty	Episode: "Family Business"
2023	Barry	Warden Reynolds	2 episodes

=== Video games ===
Year	Title	Role	Notes
1996	Wing Commander IV: The Price of Freedom	Chief Technician Robert "Pliers" Sykes	
