= List of films released by Anchor Bay Entertainment =

This is a list of films released by Anchor Bay Entertainment on home video, DVD, and Blu-ray. Formed as the result of a split between Video Treasures and Starmaker Entertainment in 1995, Anchor Bay began releasing films on VHS and DVD in 1997, and has since built a catalog of over 300 releases.

In the late 1990s and early 2000s, Anchor Bay specialized in distributing cult horror films and "B-movies", including an array of both popular and classic horror titles (e.g., Halloween, Prom Night) and more obscure and international titles from the 1960s, '70s, and '80s. The company also released a multitude of Hammer Studios films, giallo thrillers and Italian horror titles, particularly the films of Dario Argento and Lucio Fulci.

As Anchor Bay's business grew into the mid-2000s, it began to incorporate more non-horror films into its catalogue of releases. The company was purchased by IDT Entertainment in 2003, and continued to release films under both their home media branch, as well as Anchor Bay Films, the company's own film studio, which mainly distributed independent films to small markets, until Starz was acquired by Lionsgate in 2016.

== Home media ==
=== Feature films ===
- Note: Films are listed according to their DVD release date. The release date of a VHS version, if any, varies and is listed in the second column when applicable.

Title	Release dates		Notes
Title	DVD/Blu-ray	VHS	Notes
Angels Die Hard	-	October 12, 1990	as Starmaker Entertainment
Cloud Dancer	-	March 1, 1991	as Starmaker Entertainment
Bury Me an Angel	-	October 4, 1991	
Buy & Cell	-	October 4, 1991	as Starmaker Entertainment
Pinocchio and the Emperor of the Night	-	May 15, 1992	
Certain Fury	-	October 20, 1992	
Beyond Therapy	-	November 18, 1993	
Bad Manners	-	November 29, 1994	
Nice Girls Don't Explode	-	November 29, 1994	
Mystic Pizza	-	April 11, 1995	
The Burning Bed	-	July 7, 1995	
Pinocchio and the Emperor of the Night	-	October 5, 1995	Unrated version
Godzilla vs. Gigan/Godzilla 1985/Ghidrah the Three-Headed Monster/Godzilla vs. Mechagodzilla/Son of Godzilla	-	September 30, 1997	Godzilla 5-Pack
Last Plane Out	-	October 3, 1997	
Meet the Applegates	-	October 6, 1997	
The Car	April 4, 1997	July 20, 1999	
Elvira, Mistress of the Dark	August 28, 1997	—	
Dawn of the Dead	September 10, 1997	November 1, 1997	Director's cut collector's edition (DVD)
The Stepford Wives	December 3, 1997	September 10, 1997	
Prom Night	February 18, 1998	July 8, 1997	
Dead Ringers	February 27, 1998	—	
Hellbound: Hellraiser II	March 20, 1998	July 10, 2001	
The Heartbreak Kid	March 31, 1998	January 27, 1998	
Wanted: Dead or Alive	May 8, 1998	May 8, 2001	
Vigilante	July 14, 1998	February 16, 1999	
The Night Stalker / The Night Stranger	July 28, 1998	—	Double feature (DVD)
Q: The Winged Serpent	July 28, 1998	-	
The Exterminator	August 18, 1998	September 10, 1997	
Mohammad, Messenger of God	September 15, 1998	—	
Evil Dead II	October 6, 1998	February 17, 1998	Collector's Edition (VHS)
Tombs of the Blind Dead / Return of the Blind Dead	October 20, 1998	—	Double feature (DVD)
Quatermass and the Pit	October 20, 1998	October 15, 1997	Hammer Collection (DVD, VHS)
Dracula: Prince of Darkness	October 27, 1998		Hammer Collection (DVD, VHS)
Lion of the Desert	October 27, 1998	February 23, 1999	
Mark of the Devil	November 3, 1998	—	
Day of the Dead	November 10, 1998	May 26, 1998	
The Fantastic Planet	February 16, 1999	January 12, 1999	
Nosferatu the Vampyre	February 16, 1999	July 11, 2000	
The Boogeyman / The Devonsville Terror	March 2, 1999	—	Double feature (DVD)
The Devonsville Terror	—	February 8, 2000	
Tenebre	March 16, 1999	February 16, 1999	Dario Argento Collection
Demons	March 16, 1999	February 16, 1999	Dario Argento Collection
Demons 2	March 16, 1999	February 16, 1999	Dario Argento Collection
Phenomena	March 16, 1999	February 16, 1999	Dario Argento Collection
Heathers	March 30, 1999	-	
The Cat from Outer Space	April 6, 1999	April 6, 1999	
Unidentified Flying Oddball	April 6, 1999	April 6, 1999	
The Vengeance of She	April 6, 1999	-	Hammer Collection
The Viking Queen	April 6, 1999	-	Hammer Collection
Junior Bonner	May 4, 1999	May 12, 1998	
The Johnsons	May 4, 1999	May 4, 1999	
Custer of the West	May 4, 1999	July 14, 1998	
My Science Project	May 18, 1999	May 12, 1998	
Condorman	May 18, 1999	February 23, 1999	
The Swinging Cheerleaders	June 15, 1999	June 15, 1999	
Silkwood	June 15, 1999	September 29, 1998	
The Happiest Millionaire	August 3, 1999	July 20, 1999	
Return to Oz	August 3, 1999	August 17, 1999	August 10, 1999
Alice, Sweet Alice	August 24, 1999	September 10, 1997	
Hell Night	August 24, 1999	July 20, 1999	
Nightmares	August 24, 1999		
Night of the Living Dead	September 7, 1999	May 26, 1998	Collector's edition (DVD)
Spellbound	September 7, 1999	September 8, 1998	
The Paradine Case	September 7, 1999	September 8, 1998	
Rebecca	September 7, 1999	September 1, 1998	
The New York Ripper	September 7, 1999	August 24, 1999	Lucio Fulci Collection
Napoleon and Samantha	September 14, 1999	—	
Something Wicked This Way Comes	September 21, 1999	September 21, 1999	
Halloween	September 28, 1999	August 15, 1997	
Halloween: Restored Edition	September 28, 1999	—	Restored 2-disc limited edition (DVD)
Candleshoe	September 28, 1999	July 27, 1999	
Melvin and Howard	October 12, 1999	September 14, 1998	
The Guardian	October 12, 1999	October 12, 1999	
The Plague of the Zombies	November 2, 1999	September 10, 1997	Hammer Collection
Fitzcarraldo	November 16, 1999	October 19, 1999	
The Reptile	November 16, 1999	September 10, 1997	
Tex	November 16, 1999	—	
The Last Valley	November 30, 1999	January 26, 1999	
Running Time	December 14, 1999	November 16, 1999	
Zachariah	January 11, 2000	November 24, 1998	
Where the Buffalo Roam	January 11, 2000	November 24, 1998	
Macon County Line	February 8, 2000	February 8, 2000	
Aloha, Bobby and Rose	February 8, 2000	—	
National Lampoon's Class Reunion	February 8, 2000	March 24, 1998	
Never Cry Wolf	February 22, 2000	February 22, 2000	
The Killing of Sister George	February 22, 2000	February 22, 2000	
Autopsy	March 21, 2000	March 21, 2000	
The Ghost Goes Gear	April 11, 2000	April 11, 2000	
Deep Red	April 25, 2000	April 25, 2000	Dario Argento Collection
Inferno	April 25, 2000	April 25, 2000	Dario Argento Collection
Sonny & Cher in Good Times	April 25, 2000	March 31, 1998	
One Little Indian	April 25, 2000	May 9, 2000	April 25, 2000
Possession	May 9, 2000	May 9, 2000	
Vampyres	—	May 9, 2000	
Four Sided Triangle	May 23, 2000	March 23, 1999	
The Castaway Cowboy	May 23, 2000	April 25, 2000	
Quatermass 2	May 23, 2000	March 23, 1999	
Anguish	May 23, 2000	May 23, 2000	
The Vampire Happening	May 23, 2000	May 9, 2000	
Don't Torture a Duckling	May 30, 2000	May 23, 2000	Lucio Fulci Collection
Martin	June 6, 2000	—	
Army of Darkness	June 9, 2000	December 14, 1999	Director's cut limited edition
Kentucky Fried Movie	June 20, 2000	—	
Fruits of Passion: The Story of "O" Continued	June 20, 2000	—	
The Bat	July 11, 2000	July 11, 2000	
What Ever Happened to Aunt Alice?	July 11, 2000	July 11, 2000	
The Spiral Staircase	July 18, 2000	July 11, 2000	
Knightriders	July 18, 2000	—	
Bluebeard	July 18, 2000	July 13, 2000	
Ilsa, She Wolf of the SS	July 18, 2000	July 11, 2000	
Ilsa, Harem Keeper of the Oil Sheiks	July 18, 2000	July 11, 2000	
Ilsa, The Wicked Warden	July 18, 2000	July 11, 2000	
Ruckus	August 1, 2000	August 8, 2000	
Supergirl	August 8, 2000	August 11, 1998	
The Witches	August 8, 2000	August 11, 1998	Hammer Collection
Sleepaway Camp	August 8, 2000	-	
Woyzeck	August 15, 2000	August 15, 2000	
My Best Fiend	August 15, 2000	August 15, 2000	
Santa Claus: The Movie	July 10, 2001		
Halloween 5: The Revenge of Michael Myers	September 5, 2000	August 22, 2000	
Hellraiser	September 19, 2000	September 10, 1997	
The Midnight Hour	September 19, 2000	September 19, 2000	
The Philadelphia Experiment	September 19, 2000	September 19, 2000	
The Groundstar Conspiracy	September 19, 2000	September 19, 2000	
The Beyond	October 10, 2000	October 24, 2000	
Pusher	October 10, 2000	—	
The Stuff	October 10, 2000	October 24, 2000	September 10, 1997
Slugs	November 29, 2000	October 24, 2000	
Aguirre, the Wrath of God	October 24, 2000	October 24, 2000	
Cobra Verde	October 24, 2000	October 24, 2000	
Two-Lane Blacktop	October 19, 1999	October 24, 2000	Limited edition tin (DVD)
Mirror, Mirror	October 24, 2000	October 24, 2000	
Mirror, Mirror II: Raven Dance	October 24, 2000	October 24, 2000	
Mirror, Mirror III: The Voyeur	October 24, 2000	October 24, 2000	
Thou Shalt Not Kill... Except	October 28, 2000	January 12, 1999	
The Devil and Max Devlin	November 14, 2000	September 29, 1998	
A Better Tomorrow II	November 27, 2000	January 16, 2001	
That'll Be the Day	November 28, 2000	—	
Fear City	November 28, 2000	—	
The Garden of Allah	November 28, 2000	October 10, 2000	
A Better Tomorrow	January 16, 2001	January 16, 2001	
Manhunter	January 30, 2001	January 30, 2001	
Girls Just Want to Have Fun	January 30, 2001	-	
Black Moon Rising	January 30, 2001	-	
Cockfighter	January 30, 2001	January 30, 2001	
C.H.U.D.	January 30, 2001	-	
Madman	January 30, 2001	February 13, 2001	February 13, 2001
Death on the Nile	February 27, 2001	February 27, 2001	
Evil Under the Sun	February 27, 2001	February 27, 2001	
The Mirror Crack'd	February 27, 2001	February 27, 2001	
Agatha Christie's Endless Night	February 27, 2001	-	
Reform School Girls	March 12, 2001	-	
Tuff Turf	March 12, 2001	-	
Tapeheads	March 13, 2001	March 13, 2001	
Jane and the Lost City	March 13, 2001	March 13, 2001	
Jake Speed	March 13, 2001	October 3, 1997	
Creepshow 2	March 26, 2001	April 10, 2001	
Lust in the Dust	March 27, 2001	December 15, 1994	
Children of the Corn	April 10, 2001	September 10, 1997	
Maximum Overdrive	April 10, 2001	September 10, 1997	
Candy	April 10, 2001	April 10, 2001	Limited edition tin (DVD)
Mio in the Land of Faraway	April 24, 2001	—	
Three Businessmen	April 24, 2001	—	
Death and the Compass	April 24, 2001	—	
Flowers in the Attic	April 24, 2001	October 3, 1997	
The Sword and the Sorcerer	April 24, 2001	—	
Working Girls	April 24, 2001	April 24, 2001	
Straight to Hell	April 24, 2001	—	
Midnight Madness	May 15, 2001	February 23, 1999	
Mountaintop Motel Massacre	May 15, 2001	May 15, 2001	
Death Before Dishonor	May 29, 2001	May 8, 2001	
Too Late the Hero	May 29, 2001	January 26, 1999	
A Blade in the Dark	May 29, 2001	May 29, 2001	
The Boys Next Door	May 29, 2001	May 29, 2001	
The House by the Cemetery	June 12, 2001	May 22, 2001	Lucio Fulci Collection
The Black Cat	June 12, 2001	May 22, 2001	Lucio Fulci Collection
Manhattan Baby	June 12, 2001	May 22, 2001	Lucio Fulci Collection
The Final Programme	June 12, 2001	June 12, 2001	
House	June 26, 2001	January 15, 1996	
Hell Comes to Frogtown	July 10, 2001	October 6, 1997	
Def-Con 4	July 10, 2001	-	
Demons / Demons 2	July 10, 2001	—	Dario Argento Collection, double feature
Inferno / Phenomena	July 10, 2001	—	Dario Argento Collection, double feature
The Best of Benny Hill	July 10, 2001	-	
Hellbound: Hellraiser II	July 24, 2001	September 10, 1997	
Texas, Adios	July 24, 2001	July 24, 2001	
Companeros	July 24, 2001	July 24, 2001	
Tuff Turf	August 7, 2001	March 12, 2001	
Bad Boys	August 7, 2001	October 9, 2001	
Blood from the Mummy's Tomb	August 7, 2001	August 7, 2001	Hammer Collection
The Horror of Frankenstein	August 7, 2001	August 7, 2001	Hammer Collection
The Wicker Man	August 21, 2001	—	Limited edition wood box
Vamp	August 21, 2001	August 21, 2001	
Maniac	August 21, 2001	August 21, 2001	
Link	August 21, 2001	August 21, 2001	
Elvira, Mistress of the Dark	August 28, 2001	-	
Suspiria	September 11, 2001	—	Dario Argento Collection
Opera	September 11, 2001	September 11, 2001	Dario Argento Collection
Heathers	September 11, 2001	September 25, 2001	September 25, 2001
Schlock	September 11, 2001	September 25, 2001	October 2, 2001
Halloween 4: The Return of Michael Myers	October 9, 2001	August 11, 1998	
From the Hip	October 9, 2001	October 9, 2001	
Army of Darkness: Official Bootleg Edition	October 9, 2001	October 23, 2001	—
Circus of Horrors	—	October 23, 2001	
The Beastmaster	October 23, 2001	October 23, 2001	
Sleuth	November 10, 2001	January 27, 1998	
Bad Taste	November 20, 2001	November 20, 2001	
Bad Taste	November 20, 2001	—	
The Stunt Man	November 20, 2001	November 20, 2001	
The Doctor Who Collection	November 20, 2001	—	3-disc set
Lust for a Vampire	November 20, 2001	—	
Clockwise	November 20, 2001	December 4, 2001	—
The Amy Fisher Story	May 18, 1999	December 4, 2001	
Dr. Jekyll and Sister Hyde	—	December 4, 2001	
A Bullet for the General	December 18, 2001	December 18, 2001	
The Enigma of Kaspar Hauser	January 8, 2002	—	
Stroszek	January 8, 2002	—	
Going Places	January 22, 2002	—	
Honky Tonk Freeway	January 22, 2002	January 22, 2002	
The Church	February 12, 2002	—	Dario Argento Collection
Cross Creek	February 19, 2002	—	
Hell of the Living Dead	February 19, 2002	—	
Zombie	February 19, 2002	February 17, 1998	Lucio Fulci Collection
Stage Fright	February 19, 2002	—	
Frances	February 19, 2002	February 19, 2002	
The Evil Dead	March 5, 2002	—	"Book of the Dead" limited edition
The Evil Dead	March 5, 2002	—	20th anniversary edition
Soul Man	March 19, 2002	—	
Crimes of Passion	March 19, 2002	-	
Fraternity Vacation	March 19, 2002	October 6, 1997	
18 Again!	March 19, 2002	October 6, 1997	
Return of the Killer Tomatoes	April 2, 2002	—	
Transylvania 6-5000	April 2, 2002	-	
The Watcher in the Woods	April 2, 2002	September 29, 1998	
Return to Horror High	April 2, 2002	—	
Highlander	April 16, 2002	January 1, 1998	
Highlander: The Immortal Edition	April 16, 2002	—	
I Saw What You Did	April 25, 2002	August 24, 1999	
Supergirl	May 7, 2002	—	Director's cut
Fright	May 21, 2002	—	
Date with an Angel	May 21, 2002	May 21, 2001	
And Soon the Darkness	May 21, 2002	-	
The House by the Cemetery / The Beyond	June 11, 2002	—	Lucio Fulci Collection, double feature
Diamonds	June 11, 2002	—	
Beast with a Gun	June 11, 2002	—	
Are You Being Served?: The Movie	June 11, 2002	—	
House II: The Second Story	June 25, 2002	June 26, 2001	
House	June 25, 2002	-	
Who Saw Her Die?	June 25, 2002	—	The Giallo Collection
Short Night of Glass Dolls	June 25, 2002	—	The Giallo Collection
Halloween: The Extended Edition	June 25, 2002	July 9, 2002	Extended TV edition
Demons of the Mind	July 23, 2002	—	
The Black Hole	July 23, 2002	March 30, 1999	
Nightmare City	August 2, 2002	—	
Curse of the Devil	August 2, 2002	—	
Let Sleeping Corpses Lie	August 2, 2002	October 24, 2000	
Parasite	August 6, 2002	—	
Werewolf Shadow	August 6, 2002	—	
The Antichrist	August 6, 2002	—	
Sleepaway Camp	August 20, 2002	July 25, 2000	
Sleepaway Camp II: Unhappy Campers	August 20, 2002	—	
Sleepaway Camp III: Teenage Wasteland	August 20, 2002	—	
Sleepaway Camp "Survival Kit"	August 20, 2002	—	Complete Sleepaway Camp trilogy
Zoltan...Hound of Dracula	August 20, 2002	—	
The Man in the White Suit	September 10, 2002	—	
Near Dark	September 10, 2002	—	
The Initiation	September 10, 2002	—	
To the Devil a Daughter	October 8, 2002	—	Hammer Collection
Spontaneous Combustion	October 8, 2002	September 10, 1997	
Fear in the Night	October 8, 2002	—	Hammer Collection
Kind Hearts and Coronets	October 10, 2002	—	
Carry On collection	October 22, 2002	—	7-disc set
Grand Tour: Disaster In Time	November 19, 2002	June 10, 1997	
Joey	November 19, 2002	-	
The Amazing Howard Hughes	December 3, 2002	—	
The Three Musketeers	February 4, 2003	February 4, 2003	
The Four Musketeers	February 4, 2003	February 4, 2003	
The Man Who Fell to Earth	February 11, 2003	—	
The Daydreamer	March 4, 2003	March 4, 2003	
Nick Knight	March 4, 2003	—	
Winter Kills	March 18, 2003	—	
Square Dance	March 18, 2003	—	
Elephant Parts	March 18, 2003	—	
One Down, Two To Go	March 18, 2003	—	
The Black Marble	April 8, 2003	—	
3 from the Mind of Stephen King: Children of the Corn, Creepshow 2, and Maximum Overdrive	April 8, 2003	—	Triple feature
A Man, a Woman, and a Bank	April 8, 2003	—	
The Incredible Hulk Returns / The Trial of the Incredible Hulk	May 6, 2003	—	Double feature
The Railway Children	May 6, 2003	—	
The Emmanuelle Collection: Emmanuelle, Emmanuelle 2, Goodbye Emmanuelle	May 13, 2003	—	Triple feature
Return to the Batcave: The Misadventures of Adam and Burt	May 17, 2003	—	
Girls Just Want to Have Fun	May 20, 2003	March 24, 1998	
Angel / Avenging Angel / Angel III: The Final Chapter	June 10, 2003	-	The Angel Collection
Star Crystal	June 24, 2003	—	
The Aurora Encounter	June 24, 2003	—	
Hatred of a Minute	July 8, 2003	—	
Who Done It?	July 8, 2003	—	
Fear No Evil	July 22, 2003	—	
Halloween: 25th Anniversary Edition	August 5, 2003	—	Restored 2-disc Divimax edition
Day of the Dead	August 19, 2003	—	
City of the Living Dead	August 19, 2003	May 23, 2000	Lucio Fulci Collection
Mad Monster Party?	August 19, 2003	July 23, 2002	
Danielle Steel's Star	August 19, 2003	November 18, 1997	
Scary Godmother: Halloween Spooktakular	September 3, 2003	September 14, 2004	
Society / Spontaneous Combustion	September 9, 2003	—	Drive-In Double Feature edition
Possession / Shock	September 9, 2003	—	Drive-In Double Feature edition
Mountain of the Cannibal God / Cannibal Man	September 9, 2003	—	Drive-In Double Feature edition
Hell of the Living Dead / Rats: Night of Terror	September 9, 2003	—	Drive-In Double Feature edition
A Blade in the Dark / Macabre	September 9, 2003	—	Drive-In Double Feature edition
The Initiation / Mountaintop Motel Massacre	September 9, 2003	—	Drive-In Double Feature edition
The Hills Have Eyes	September 22, 2003	—	
Silent Night, Deadly Night / Silent Night, Deadly Night 2	October 7, 2003	—	Double feature
Neon Maniacs	October 7, 2003	—	
Escape 2000	October 21, 2003	—	
Beyond Therapy	December 2, 2003	March 24, 1998	
Frankenstein Created Woman / The Legend of the 7 Golden Vampires	December 9, 2003	—	Hammer Collection, double feature
Transylvania 6-5000	January 5, 2004	—	
Dead Heat	January 27, 2004	October 3, 1997	
Werner Herzog and Klaus Kinski: A Film Legacy	March 1, 2004	—	Six film set
The Ladykillers	March 16, 2004	—	
The Osterman Weekend	March 23, 2004	—	
The Wrong Guys	March 30, 2004	October 6, 1997	
Reform School Girls	March 30, 2004	March 12, 2001	
H.O.T.S.	March 30, 2004	July 11, 2000	
C.H.U.D.	March 30, 2004	January 30, 2001	
Timerider	March 30, 2004	October 9, 2001	
The Wicker Man	May 19, 2004	August 21, 2001	Unrated version (VHS)
The Unbelievable Truth	June 7, 2004	March 13, 2001	
Hiding Out	June 7, 2004	—	
Dakota	June 7, 2004	—	
Evil Under the Sun	June 7, 2004	February 27, 2001	
Can't Stop the Music - The Village People	June 7, 2004	—	
Night Patrol	June 22, 2004	—	
Black Moon Rising	July 3, 2004	July 28, 1994	
Evilspeak	July 13, 2004	—	
Cheerleader Camp	August 3, 2004	—	
Werner Herzog Collection	August 3, 2004	—	Six film set
Happy Hell Night	August 3, 2004	—	
Night of the Demons	August 24, 2004	—	
Witchboard	August 24, 2004	—	
Scars of Dracula	August 31, 2004	August 7, 2001	Hammer Collection
Creepshow 2	September 28, 2004	—	Divimax edition
Children of the Corn: 20th Anniversary Special Edition	September 28, 2004	—	Divimax edition
Train Ride to Hollywood	September 28, 2004	November 24, 1998	
Android	October 12, 2004	—	
The Nutcracker and the Mouseking	October 19, 2004	October 19, 2004	
The Pit / Hellgate	October 19, 2004	—	Drive-In Double Feature edition
Forgotten Silver	October 26, 2004	—	
Kathy Griffin - Allegedly	November 30, 2004	—	
Q: The Winged Serpent	January 1, 2005	May 26, 1998	
One Down, Two to Go / Brotherhood of Death	January 11, 2005	—	Drive-In Double Feature edition
BeastMaster	January 25, 2005	—	Special edition
Death Hunt	January 25, 2005	—	
Downtown	January 25, 2005	-	
The Turning Point	January 25, 2005	-	
The Specials	February 8, 2005	—	Special edition
Project X	February 22, 2005	—	
Modern Problems	February 22, 2005	—	
Butch and Sundance: The Early Days	February 22, 2005	—	
Dutch	March 8, 2005	—	
Rhinestone	March 8, 2005	—	
29th Street	March 22, 2005	—	
Mickey	March 22, 2005	—	
Vanishing Point	March 22, 2005	-	
Without a Trace	March 22, 2005	-	
Mischief	April 5, 2005	—	
Nuns on the Run	April 5, 2005	-	
Danielle Steel's Daddy	April 19, 2005	November 18, 1997	
Danielle Steel's Kaleidoscope	April 19, 2005	November 18, 1997	
Danielle Steel's: Changes	April 19, 2005	November 18, 1997	
Danielle Steel's: Vanished	April 19, 2005	November 18, 1997	
Danielle Steel's Fine Things	April 19, 2005	November 18, 1997	
Danielle Steel's Jewels	April 19, 2005		
Malevolence	April 19, 2005	—	Divimax edition
Summer Holiday	April 26, 2005	—	
The Entity	May 3, 2005	—	
License to Drive	May 3, 2005	—	
Turk 182	May 3, 2005	—	
Quicksilver Highway	May 17, 2005	—	
The Stone Boy	May 17, 2005	-	
Only the Lonely	June 14, 2005	-	
Eyewitness	June 28, 2005	—	
Race With the Devil	June 28, 2005	—	
Dirty Mary Crazy Larry	June 28, 2005	—	"Supercharger" edition
Freaked	July 12, 2005	—	
Moving Violations	July 12, 2005	—	
Max Dugan Returns	July 12, 2005	—	
The Dead Next Door	August 9, 2005	—	
The Locals	August 9, 2005	—	
Lightning Bug	August 9, 2005	—	
The Card Player	August 23, 2005	—	
Trauma	August 23, 2005	—	
Dead & Breakfast	September 6, 2005	—	
Thunderstruck	September 6, 2005	—	
Danielle Steel's A Perfect Stranger	September 20, 2005	April 8, 1999	
Danielle Steel's Once In A Lifetime	September 20, 2005	April 8, 1999	
Danielle Steel's the Ring	September 20, 2005	April 8, 1999	
Danielle Steel's Mixed Blessings	September 20, 2005	April 8, 1999	
Danielle Steel's Remembrance	September 20, 2005	April 8, 1999	
Danielle Steel's Heartbeat	September 20, 2005	April 8, 1999	
Danielle Steel's Secrets	September 20, 2005	April 8, 1999	
Evil Dead II	September 27, 2005	—	"Book of the Dead" limited edition
Man With the Screaming Brain	October 4, 2005	—	
Alien Apocalypse	October 4, 2005	—	
Day of the Dead 2: Contagium	October 18, 2005	—	
The Jazz Singer	October 18, 2005	—	25th anniversary edition
Season of the Witch/There's Always Vanilla	October 18, 2005	-	
The Message	November 22, 2005	—	30th anniversary edition
Danielle Steel's Palomino	December 20, 2005	November 18, 1997	
All Souls Day	January 17, 2006	—	
Puppet Master vs Demonic Toys	January 17, 2006	—	
A Change of Seasons	January 17, 2006	—	
My Big Fat Independent Movie	January 24, 2006	—	
Danielle Steel's Zoya	February 7, 2006	May 25, 1999	
Danielle Steel's No Greater Love	February 7, 2006	May 25, 1999	
Danielle Steel's Full Circle	February 7, 2006	May 25, 1999	
Danielle Steel's Family Album	February 7, 2006	May 25, 1999	
Demon Hunter	February 7, 2006	—	
Class of 1984	February 21, 2006	-	
Girl 6	March 7, 2006	—	
Free Enterprise	March 7, 2006	-	
The Anniversary	April 4, 2006	—	
Six Pack	April 4, 2006	—	
The Scorned	April 4, 2006	—	
The Killing Time	April 18, 2006	—	
Bad Dreams	April 18, 2006	—	
Visiting Hours	April 18, 2006	—	
It Waits	May 23, 2006	—	
Warning Sign	May 23, 2006	—	
Room 6	June 13, 2006	—	
The Sisters	June 13, 2006	—	
The Quiet Earth	June 13, 2006	—	
Cemetery Man	June 13, 2006	—	
Fatso	June 13, 2006	—	
Zorro, The Gay Blade	June 13, 2006	—	
Folks!	June 13, 2006	—	
Deck Dogz	July 25, 2006	—	
Beowulf & Grendel	July 25, 2006	—	
The Tooth Fairy	August 8, 2006	—	
Heart Like a Wheel	August 15, 2006	-	
Satan's Playground	August 22, 2006	—	
Aunt Rose	September 12, 2006	—	
Left in Darkness	September 19, 2006	—	
Abominable	October 3, 2006	—	
The Norliss Tapes	October 3, 2006	—	
Voodoo Moon	October 3, 2006	—	
Baby Blood	October 10, 2006	—	
Superstition	October 10, 2006	—	
Monster Night	October 10, 2006	—	
Skinwalker: Curse of the Shaman	October 24, 2006	—	
Heartstopper (Heart)	October 31, 2006	—	
Heartstopper (Flatline)	October 31, 2006	—	
Freak Out	November 7, 2006	—	
The Seduction	November 7, 2006	—	
Tough Enough	November 7, 2006	-	
Raptor Island	November 14, 2006	—	
Slayer	November 21, 2006	—	
Bloodletting: The Vampire Scrolls	December 5, 2006	—	
The Quick and the Undead	December 5, 2006	—	
The Wicker Man	December 19, 2006	—	2-disc collector's edition
Damnation Alley	January 1, 2007	—	
The Darkroom	January 2, 2007	—	
The Veteran	January 9, 2007	—	
Stan Lee's Lightspeed	January 9, 2007	—	
The Shunned	January 9, 2007	—	
Stan Lee Presents: Mosaic	January 9, 2007	—	
Suzanne's Diary for Nicholas	January 30, 2007	—	
Hellboy: Sword of Storms	February 6, 2007	—	
The Devil's Den	February 13, 2007	—	
Night of the Living Dorks	February 20, 2007	—	
Apartment Zero	February 20, 2007	—	Original theatrical version
Death Row	March 6, 2007	—	
The Manitou	March 6, 2007	—	
Hellboy: Blood and Iron	March 10, 2007	—	
The Hellbenders	March 13, 2007	—	
The Pleasure Drivers	March 13, 2007	—	
Re-Animator	March 20, 2007	-	
Kidnapped	April 3, 2007	—	
Dead and Deader	April 10, 2007	—	
Survival Quest	April 10, 2007	—	
The Holy Mountain	May 1, 2007	—	
El Topo	May 1, 2007	—	
The Thirst	May 15, 2007	—	
They're Playing with Fire	May 15, 2007	—	
Dark Corners	May 22, 2007	—	
Inside Out	June 19, 2007	—	
Four Last Songs	June 26, 2007	—	
Behind the Mask: The Rise of Leslie Vernon	June 26, 2007	—	
Shadow Puppets	July 24, 2007	—	
Gettin' It	August 7, 2007	—	
Body Rock	August 21, 2007	January 24, 1992	
An East Side Story: A Musical Comedy, A New York Story	August 28, 2007	—	
Unholy	September 4, 2007	—	
Shanghai Kiss	October 9, 2007	—	
The Other Conquest	October 16, 2007	—	
Black Sunday	—	Mario Bava Collection	
Manufacturing Dissent	November 6, 2007	—	
Midnight Movies: From the Margin to the Mainstream	November 13, 2007	—	
The Man from Earth	November 13, 2007	—	
All She Wants For Christmas	November 27, 2007	—	
The Girl Next Door	December 4, 2007	—	
Hatchet	December 18, 2007	—	Unrated director's
Jimmy and Judy	January 1, 2008	—	
He Was A Quiet Man	January 15, 2008	—	
Went to Coney Island on a Mission from God... Be Back by Five	January 15, 2008	—	Director's presentation
Spiral	February 19, 2008	—	
To Kill a King	February 26, 2008	—	
Return of the Killer Tomatoes	March 4, 2008	-	
Sands of Oblivion	March 11, 2008	—	
The Lost	March 18, 2008	—	
The Cook	April 1, 2008	—	
Girls Just Want to Have Fun	April 29, 2008	-	
David Beckham: Life of an Icon	May 6, 2008	—	
Mad Money	May 13, 2008	—	
The Grand	June 10, 2008	—	
It's a Boy Girl Thing	June 17, 2008	—	
Heathers: 20th Anniversary High School Edition	July 1, 2008	—	
Hellboy: Sword of Storms	July 1, 2008	—	
Sex and Death 101	July 1, 2008	—	
Hellboy Animated	July 1, 2008	—	Limited Edition 2-pack with figurine
Sleepwalking	July 8, 2008	—	
Alice Upside Down: The Movie	July 29, 2008	—	
Queen Sized	August 5, 2008	—	
Virgin Territory	August 26, 2008	—	
Diana: The Witnesses in the Tunnel	August 26, 2008	—	
Kordavision	September 2, 2008	—	
Noise	September 16, 2008	—	
A Broken Life	September 23, 2008	—	
Vanguard	September 23, 2008	—	
Breathing Room	September 23, 2008	—	
Bryan Loves You	September 23, 2008	—	
Five Across the Eyes	September 30, 2008	—	
The Visitor	October 7, 2008	—	
Jack Brooks: Monster Slayer	October 7, 2008	—	
Flashbacks of a Fool	November 4, 2008	—	
Comic Books Unbound	November 4, 2008	—	
Too Tough to Die: A Tribute to Johnny Ramone	November 4, 2008	—	
Black Christmas	November 18, 2008	-	
Lower Learning	December 2, 2008	—	
Wisegal	December 2, 2008	—	
Traitor	December 16, 2008	—	
Surfer Dude	December 30, 2008	—	
Hellbound: Hellraiser II	December 30, 2008	-	20th Anniversary Edition
Righteous Kill	January 6, 2009	—	
The Alphabet Killer	January 6, 2009	—	
All Roads Lead Home	January 13, 2009	-	
Henry Poole Is Here	January 20, 2009	-	
Fantastic Flesh: The Art of Make-Up EFX	January 27, 2009	—	
His Name Was Jason: 30 Years of Friday the 13th	February 3, 2009	—	
The Guitar	February 10, 2009	—	
Red Mist	February 10, 2009	—	
Cyclops	February 18, 2009	—	
True Confessions of a Hollywood Starlet	March 3, 2009	—	
Walled In	March 17, 2009	—	
The Velveteen Rabbit	March 17, 2009	—	
Columbus Day	March 24, 2009	—	
American High School	April 7, 2009	—	
Tokyo Zombie	April 7, 2009	—	
Dog Days of Summer	April 21, 2009	—	
Hellraiser: Boxed Set	April 21, 2009	—	
Laid to Rest	April 21, 2009	—	Unrated director's cut
While She Was Out	April 28, 2009	—	
Look	May 5, 2009	—	
Last Chance Harvey	May 5, 2009	—	
The Lost Treasure of the Grand Canyon	May 26, 2009	—	
Strike	June 9, 2009	—	
Table for Three	June 23, 2009	—	
The Education of Charlie Banks	June 30, 2009	—	
Skeleton Crew	July 21, 2009	—	
Streets of Blood	July 28, 2009	—	
Acolytes	July 28, 2009	—	
Bart Got a Room	July 28, 2009	—	
Spring Break	August 18, 2009	—	
Hardbodies	August 18, 2009	—	
Merlin and the Book of Beasts	August 25, 2009	—	
Sunshine Cleaning	August 25, 2009	—	
Pahappahooey Island: What About Me!?	August 25, 2009	—	
Nature of the Beast	September 8, 2009	—	
Grace	September 15, 2009	—	
The Haunted World of El Superbeasto	September 22, 2009	—	
Edges of Darkness	September 22, 2009	—	
The Shortcut	September 29, 2009	—	
Lies & Illusions	September 29, 2009	—	
Children of the Corn	October 6, 2009	—	
Happy Birthday to Me	October 13, 2009	—	
Nothing Like the Holidays	October 27, 2009	—	
Stan Helsing	October 27, 2009	—	
Not Forgotten	November 3, 2009	—	
Spread	November 10, 2009	—	
The Break-Up Artist	November 10, 2009	—	
The Open Road	November 17, 2009	—	
Blue Seduction	November 17, 2009	—	
Pahappahooey Island: Do It Afraid!	November 17, 2009	—	
Frat Party	December 1, 2009	—	
Paper Heart	December 1, 2009	—	
The Dog Who Saved Christmas	December 8, 2009	—	
InAlienable	December 8, 2009	—	
Walled In	December 8, 2009	—	
Beyond a Reasonable Doubt	December 22, 2009	—	
Ghost Machine	December 22, 2009	—	
Good Witch	December 22, 2009	—	
Falling Up	January 5, 2010	—	
Growth	January 18, 2010	-	
According to Greta	January 19, 2010	—	
Pandorum	January 19, 2010	—	
Dante's Inferno: An Animated Epic	February 9, 2010	—	
Law Abiding Citizen	February 16, 2010	—	
Beyond Sherwood Forest	March 9, 2010	—	
Capitalism: A Love Story	March 9, 2010	—	
The Men Who Stare at Goats	March 23, 2010	—	
The Slammin' Salmon	April 13, 2010	—	
The New Daughter	May 18, 2010	—	
The Stranger	June 1, 2010	—	
The Crazies	June 29, 2010	—	
Iodine	July 6, 2010	—	
Brooklyn's Finest	July 6, 2010	—	
Hungry Hills	July 13, 2010	—	
Operation: Endgame	July 27, 2010	—	
After.Life	August 3, 2010	—	
Abandoned	August 24, 2010	—	
City Island	August 24, 2010	—	
Growth	September 7, 2010	—	
Solitary Man	September 7, 2010	—	
Stripped Naked	September 21, 2010	—	
Frozen	September 28, 2010	—	
The Rig	October 5, 2010	—	
Icarus	October 19, 2010	—	
Attitude	October 26, 2010	—	
Hunt to Kill	November 9, 2010	—	
The Disappearance of Alice Creed	November 23, 2010	—	
Dear Mr. Gacy	December 14, 2010	—	
And Soon the Darkness	December 28, 2010	—	
Jack Goes Boating	January 18, 2011	—	
Fire on the Amazon	January 18, 2011	—	
Stone	January 18, 2011	—	
Let Me In	February 1, 2011	—	
Chuggington: Let's Ride the Rails	February 8, 2011	—	
I Spit on Your Grave	February 8, 2011	—	
The Bleeding	March 1, 2011	—	
Sharktopus	March 15, 2011	—	
Chuggington: Chuggers to the Rescue	April 5, 2011	—	
Your Love Never Fails	April 5, 2011	—	
The King's Speech	April 19, 2011	—	
Dinoshark	April 26, 2011	—	
Blue Valentine	May 10, 2011	—	
Daydream Nation	May 17, 2011	—	
The Company Men	June 7, 2011	—	
Kill the Irishman	June 14, 2011	—	
Happythankyoumoreplease	June 21, 2011	—	
Miral	July 12, 2011	—	
Tekken	July 19, 2011	—	
Turbulent Skies	July 26, 2011	—	
Chuggington: It's Training Time	August 2, 2011	—	
Hoodwinked Too! Hood vs. Evil	August 16, 2011	—	
Meet Monica Velour	August 16, 2011	—	
Bereavement	August 30, 2011	—	
The Entitled	September 6, 2011	—	
Spartacus: Gods of the Arena	September 13, 2011	—	
The Dog Who Saved Halloween	September 13, 2011	—	
Submarine	October 4, 2011	—	
Scream 4	October 4, 2011	—	
Chuggington: The Chugger Championship	October 11, 2011	—	
Beautiful Boy	October 11, 2011	—	
The Howling: Reborn	October 18, 2011	—	
Father of Invention	October 25, 2011	—	
13	November 8, 2011	—	
Sarah's Key	November 22, 2011	—	
Carjacked	November 22, 2011	—	
Spy Kids: All the Time in the World	November 22, 2011	-	
Our Idiot Brother	November 29, 2011	—	
5 Days of War	November 29, 2011	—	
Apollo 18	December 27, 2011	—	
I Don't Know How She Does It	January 3, 2012	—	
Dirty Girl	January 17, 2012	—	
Mother's Day (2010)	May 8, 2012	—	
The Aggression Scale	May 29, 2012	—	
Demoted	June 12, 2012	—	
Mac & Devin Go to High School	July 3, 2012	—	
Mother's Day (1980)	September 4, 2012	—	
Excision	October 16, 2012	—	
247°F	October 23, 2012	—	
Chilly Christmas	November 6, 2012	Direct-to-DVD	
Vamps	November 13, 2012	—	
Lawless	November 27, 2012	—	
Butter	December 4, 2012	—	
Girls Against Boys	February 26, 2013	—	
Lay the Favorite	March 5, 2013	—	
Bachelorette	March 19, 2013	—	
Django Unchained	April 16, 2013	—	
Dragon	April 16, 2013	—	
Silver Linings Playbook	April 30, 2013	—	
The Details	April 30, 2013	—	
Dark Skies	May 28, 2013	—	
Pusher	June 25, 2013	—	
Solomon Kane	July 16, 2013	—	
Aftershock	August 6, 2013	—	
Pawn Shop Chronicles	August 27, 2013	–	
The Lords of Salem	September 3, 2013	—	
I Spit on Your Grave 2	September 23, 2013	—	
Down Periscope	October 1, 2013	–	
Nothing Left to Fear	October 8, 2013	—	
Only God Forgives	October 22, 2013	—	
Lovelace	November 5, 2013	—	
Concussion	January 28, 2014	—	
Frankenstein Created Woman	January 28, 2014	—	
Scorned	February 4, 2014	—	
In Fear	March 11, 2014	—	
13 Sins	June 17, 2014	—	
Road to Paloma	July 15, 2014	—	
Blue Ruin	July 22, 2014	—	
The Railway Man	August 12, 2014	—	
The Possession of Michael King	August 26, 2014	—	
Free Fall	October 28, 2014	—	
Sin City: A Dame to Kill For	November 18, 2014	—	
The Giver	November 25, 2014	—	
Kite	December 2, 2014	—	
Horns	January 6, 2015	—	
St. Vincent	February 17, 2015	—	
Muck	March 17, 2015	—	
The Imitation Game	March 31, 2015	—	
The Immigrant	April 7, 2015	—	
Echoes	April 14, 2015	—	
Manny	April 14, 2015	-	
Everly	April 21, 2015	—	
Paddington	April 28, 2015	—	
Spring	June 2, 2015	—	
Woman in Gold	July 7, 2015	—	
It Follows	July 14, 2015	—	
Southpaw	October 27, 2015	-	
Macbeth	March 8, 2016	—	
Carol	March 15, 2016	—	Blu-ray version includes Digital HD.
The Hateful Eight	March 29, 2016	—	
Jane Got a Gun	April 26, 2016	—	
Vigilante Diaries	July 6, 2016	—	
The Lost Bladesman	November 1, 2016	—	
Santa's Apprentice	November 1, 2016	—	
Christmas Eve	November 1, 2016	—	
Army of One	November 15, 2016	—	
Hands of Stone	November 22, 2016	—	
To Joey, with Love	December 20, 2016	—	
2 Lava 2 Lantula	January 3, 2017	—	
Lion	April 11, 2017	—	
The Founder	April 18, 2017	—	
Gold	May 2, 2017	—	
Abruptio	September 27, 2024	—	
Dinner with Leatherface	February 25, 2025	—	

=== Television ===
Series	Release date	Format	Notes
Crime Story: Pilot Episode	September 19, 2000	DVD	
Moonlighting: The Pilot Episode	January 25, 2000	DVD	
Xena: Warrior Princess - Series Finale	March 26, 2002	DVD	Director's cut
Highlander - Season One	November 12, 2002	DVD	
Hercules: The Legendary Journeys - Season One	June 24, 2003	DVD	
Highlander - Season Two	July 29, 2003	DVD	
Hercules: The Legendary Journeys - Season Two	October 21, 2003	DVD	
Crime Story - Season One	November 4, 2003	DVD	
Three's Company - Season One	November 11, 2003	DVD	
Highlander - Season Three	November 18, 2003	DVD	
Xena: Warrior Princess - Season Three	February 10, 2004	DVD	
Hercules, The Legendary Journeys - Season 3	March 24, 2004	DVD	
Highlander - Season Four	April 13, 2004	DVD	
Three's Company - Season Two	May 4, 2004	DVD	
Xena: Warrior Princess - Season Four	June 15, 2004	DVD	
Hercules: The Legendary Journeys - Season Four	July 13, 2004	DVD	
Highlander - Season Five	August 10, 2004	DVD	
Silk Stalkings - The Complete First Season	September 28, 2004	DVD	
Xena: Warrior Princess - Season Five	October 19, 2004	DVD	
21 Jump Street - Season One	October 26, 2004	DVD	
Three's Company - Season Three	November 2, 2004	DVD	
Hercules: The Legendary Journeys - Season Five	January 11, 2005	DVD	
Highlander - Season Six	February 8, 2005	DVD	
The Greatest American Hero - Season One	February 15, 2005	DVD	
Xena: Warrior Princess - Season Six	March 8, 2005	DVD	
21 Jump Street - Season Two	March 8, 2005	DVD	
Silk Stalkings - The Complete Second Season	March 22, 2005	DVD	
The Greatest American Hero - Season Two	April 5, 2005	DVD	
Three's Company - Season 4	May 3, 2005	DVD	
Hercules: The Legendary Journeys - Season 6	July 12, 2005	DVD	
Three's Company - Season 5	November 15, 2005	DVD	
Three's Company - Season 6	March 7, 2006	DVD	
Three's Company - Season 7	July 25, 2006	DVD	
Three's Company - Season 8	October 3, 2006	DVD	
Crash - Season 1	September 15, 2009	DVD/Blu-ray	
Party Down - Season 1	April 6, 2010	DVD	
Spartacus: Blood and Sand - Season 1	September 21, 2010	DVD/Blu-ray	
Party Down - Season 2	September 28, 2010	DVD	
Camelot - Season 1	September 13, 2011	DVD/Blu-ray	
Spartacus: Gods of the Arena - miniseries	September 13, 2011	DVD/Blu-ray	
The Walking Dead - Season 1	October 4, 2011	DVD/Blu-ray	
Boss - Season 1	July 24, 2012	DVD/Blu-ray	
The Walking Dead - Season 2	August 28, 2012	DVD/Blu-ray	
Spartacus: Vengeance - Season 2	September 11, 2012	DVD/Blu-ray	
Magic City - Season 1	October 2, 2012	DVD/Blu-ray	
Boss - Season 2	April 9, 2013	DVD/Blu-ray	
The Walking Dead - Season 3	August 27, 2013	DVD/Blu-ray	
Spartacus: War of the Damned - Season 3	September 3, 2013	DVD/Blu-ray	
Da Vinci's Demons - Season 1	September 13, 2013	DVD/Blu-ray	
Crash - Season 2	October 18, 2013	DVD	
Magic City - Season 2	November 5, 2013	DVD/Blu-ray	
The White Queen - Season 1	February 4, 2014	DVD/Blu-ray	
The Walking Dead - Season 4	August 26, 2014	DVD/Blu-ray	
Black Sails - Season 1	January 6, 2015	DVD/Blu-ray	
Da Vinci's Demons - Season 2	March 3, 2015	DVD/Blu-ray	
TURИ: Washington's Spies - Season 1	March 17, 2015	DVD/Blu-ray	
The Missing - Season 1	April 14, 2015	DVD/Blu-ray	
Halt and Catch Fire - Season 1	May 5, 2015	DVD/Blu-ray	
Power - Season 1	May 12, 2015	DVD/Blu-ray	
Survivor's Remorse - Season 1	June 16, 2015	DVD	
The Walking Dead - Season 5	August 25, 2015	DVD/Blu-ray	
Black Sails - Season 2	November 3, 2015	DVD/Blu-ray	
Fear the Walking Dead	December 1, 2015	DVD/Blu-ray	
Flesh and Bone - miniseries	January 5, 2016	DVD/Blu-ray	
Da Vinci's Demons - Season 3	January 22, 2016	DVD/Blu-ray	
TURИ: Washington's Spies - Season 2	March 22, 2016	DVD	
Power - Season 2	June 14, 2016	DVD/Blu-ray	
The Girlfriend Experience - Season 1	August 2, 2016	DVD/Blu-ray	
Halt and Catch Fire - Season 2	August 9, 2016	DVD	
Ash vs Evil Dead - Season 1	August 23, 2016	DVD/Blu-ray	
The Walking Dead - Season 6	August 23, 2016	DVD/Blu-ray	
Blunt Talk - Season 1	August 30, 2016	DVD	
Black Sails - Season 3	November 8, 2016	DVD/Blu-ray	
Into the Badlands - Season 1	November 8, 2016	DVD/Blu-ray	
TURИ: Washington's Spies - Season 3	November 8, 2016	DVD	
Fear the Walking Dead - Season 2	December 13, 2016	DVD/Blu-ray	
Power - Season 3	June 13, 2017	DVD/Blu-ray	
Ash vs Evil Dead - Season 2	August 22, 2017	DVD/Blu-ray	
Black Sails - Season 4	August 29, 2017	Blu-ray	
The White Princess - miniseries	August 29, 2017	DVD/Blu-ray	

- List adapted from The Internet DVD Database and Amazon.com.
