= Sara Tomko =

American actress (born 1983)

- Tomko in 2026
- Born: October 19, 1983 (age 43); Wright-Patterson Air Force Base, Ohio, US
- Occupation: Actress
- Years active: 2008–present
- Known for: Resident Alien
- Spouse: Theodore Pederson (m. 2021)

Sara Tomko (born October 19, 1983) is an American actress known for playing Asta Twelvetrees in the science-fiction comedy series Resident Alien.

== Early life ==
Tomko was born in 1983 on Wright-Patterson Air Force Base near Dayton, Ohio, into a military family, and is of Polish, Slovak, and Native American descent, though she is not enrolled in any specific tribe. She grew up in Manassas, Virginia, and was classically trained as a singer and attended James Madison University in Virginia, graduating with a B.A. in theatre and dance.

== Career ==
Tomko is known for her role as Asta Twelvetrees on Syfy's Resident Alien and several episodes as Tiger Lily in seasons six and seven of ABC's Once Upon a Time—returning for the series finale. She has also appeared in S.W.A.T., The Leftovers, Heartbeat, Sneaky Pete, and more. She has additionally had roles in the films The Terminators (2009), Extracted (2012), and 400 Days (2015), among others.

== Personal life ==
Tomko has been in a relationship with director Theodore "TJ" Pederson since November 2015, and the couple became engaged in November 2020; they married in May 2021.

== Selected filmography ==
=== Film ===
List of film appearances, with year, title, and role shown
Year	Title	Role	Notes
2008	Journey to the Center of the Earth	Betsy Case	
2008	2012: Doomsday	Wakanna	
2009	The Terminators	Pallas	
2012	Extracted	Minnie	
2015	400 Days	reporter	

=== Television ===
List of television appearances, with year, title, and role shown
Year	Title	Role	Notes
2015	The Leftovers	The Woman	Episode: "Axis Mundi"
2016	Heartbeat	Dr. Blackhorse	Episode: "The Inverse"
2017	The Son	Lena	Episode: "Honey Hunt"
2017	Once Upon a Time	Tiger Lily	4 episodes
2018	S.W.A.T.	Officer Donna Gentry	Episode: "Contamination"
2018	Sneaky Pete	Suzanne	2 episodes
2021–2025	Resident Alien	Asta Twelvetrees	44 episodes
