= Extracted (film) =

- Directed by: Nir Paniry
- Written by: Nir Paniry
- Story by: Gabriel Cowan; Nir Paniry; John Suits
- Produced by: Gabriel Cowan; John Suits
- Starring: Sasha Roiz; Dominic Bogart; Jenny Mollen; Rodney Eastmen; Nick Jamison; Ty Simpkins; Brad Culver; Sara Tomko; Frank Ashmore; Richard Riehle; David Sullivan
- Cinematography: Mark Putnam
- Edited by: Seth Boston
- Music by: Tim Ziesmer
- Production company: New Artists Alliance
- Distributed by: Phase 4 Films
- Release date: March 10, 2012 (SXSW)
- Running time: 89 minutes
- Country: United States
- Language: English
- Budget: $100,000

Extracted, also known as Extraction in the UK, is an independent 2012 American science fiction thriller directed and written by Nir Paniry. Sasha Roiz stars as a scientist whose consciousness becomes trapped in the mind of a convict (Dominic Bogart) who volunteered to be a part of an experimental procedure.

== Plot ==
Tom, a scientist, invents a machine that can insert a person into the subconscious mind of another person. Desperate for funding to complete his prototype, he is forced to accept money from an anonymous investor. When the investor threatens to pull out, Tom reluctantly agrees to a demonstration a month ahead of schedule. The investor turns out to be an official at the Department of Corrections who wants to use the machine to extract involuntary confessions from convicts. Initially repulsed by the idea, Tom's friend, an entrepreneur, convinces him to proceed, and Tom enters the mind of Anthony, an addict who is suspected of having killed his girlfriend Adrienne. Though Anthony volunteers in order to prove his innocence, Tom is able to walk through Anthony's fractured memories and prove his guilt. However, when Tom tries to return his consciousness to his own body, the machine malfunctions and traps him in Anthony's mind. Unable to leave, Tom passes the years by watching Anthony's memories, while his body remains in a coma.

Meanwhile, Anthony returns to jail and, despite his father's lack of faith in him, still maintains his innocence. When his father gives him a box of photographs, Anthony happens to recall a memory as Tom watches it. Inside the memory, Anthony stares in shock at Tom, something that Tom believes to be impossible. Convinced that this will allow him to communicate with Anthony, Tom haunts a commonly-recalled memory and waits for Anthony to stumble on him again. When they make contact, Tom explains his situation and asks for Anthony's help. Anthony agrees and sets up a meeting with Tom's wife, Abbey. With Tom's help, Anthony is able to convince her to set up another experiment with the machine, though she must agree to give the technology to the Department of Corrections in order to get authorization. However, Anthony delays the experiment and demands another chance to prove his innocence. Although angry at Anthony's betrayal, Tom is powerless to refuse. With Tom's help, Anthony pieces together more details and remembers being attacked by a former accomplice.

Encouraged by this breakthrough, Anthony escapes from custody and tracks down his friend, who reveals that Adrienne was sleeping with him for drugs. His friend maintains his innocence and suggests that Anthony killed her when she revealed this to him. Unwilling to accept this, Anthony attempts to kill him, and both are wounded. Understanding that he is dying, Anthony abandons his revenge on his former friend and instead drives to Abbey. With Tom's help, Anthony is able to guide Abbey through the process and extract Tom from his unconscious. Anthony dies from his wounds, but Tom is finally reunited with his family.

Haunted by merged memories, Tom makes contact with Anthony's father, Martino, who reveals that he set up his son for Adrienne's death, in the belief that jail would finally allow Anthony to clean up from his addiction. Finally realizing that Anthony was innocent all along, Tom pieces together the last few parts of the repressed memory: Adrienne breaks up with Anthony because of the guilt she feels over cheating on him, and when Anthony confronts her, she commits suicide.

== Cast ==
- Sasha Roiz as Tom
- Dominic Bogart as Anthony
  - Ty Simpkins as Young Anthony
- Jenny Mollen as Abbey
- Nick Jamison as Richard
- Rodney Eastman as Eric
- Frank Ashmore as Martino
- Brad Culver as Garrett
- Sara Tomko as Minnie
- Augie Duke as Adrienne
- Mattie Grace Compos as Donna
- Richard Riehle as Father Riley
- David Sullivan as Peter (cameo)

== Production ==
The budget was $100,000. During development, the script was rewritten to keep costs down. Director Nir Paniry wanted to make a science fiction film that depends more on story than budget and was inspired by Primer. Roiz was cast after his starring role in Caprica. He stated that Paniry was open to any suggestions, and the film was a collaborative effort.

== Release ==
Extracted premiered at SXSW on March 10, 2012 and played at Sci-Fi-London in 2012. It was picked up for distribution by Phase 4 Films in June 2012.

== Reception ==
In a positive review, Scott Weinberg of Twitch Film wrote that the film is "clearly inspired" by other science fiction films, but it brings "some refreshing novelty of its own to the party". Alex Fitch of Electric Sheep called it "an excellent science-fiction thriller that, while reminiscent of a number of other films ... improves on all its predecessors". Jeremy Kirk of First Showing rated it 8.5/10 and described it as "a classic case on how indie science fiction works", focused on character and narrative. Starburst rated it 5/10 stars and wrote that the film's execution falls short of its "fascinating, thought-provoking" premise.
