= Just Before I Go =

- Theatrical release poster
- Directed by: Courteney Cox
- Written by: David Flebotte
- Produced by: Courteney Cox; Gabriel Cowan; Thea Mann
- Starring: Seann William Scott; Olivia Thirlby; Garret Dillahunt; Kate Walsh; Kyle Gallner; Evan Ross; Rob Riggle; Mackenzie Marsh; Missi Pyle; Connie Stevens; David Arquette; Elisha Cuthbert; Cleo King
- Cinematography: Mark Schwartzbard
- Edited by: Roger Bondelli
- Music by: Erran Baron Cohen
- Production companies: New Artists Alliance; Coquette Productions
- Distributed by: Anchor Bay Entertainment
- Release dates: April 24, 2014 (Tribeca); April 24, 2015 (United States)
- Running time: 90 minutes
- Country: United States
- Language: English
- Box office: $10,970 (US)

Just Before I Go, previously entitled Hello I Must Be Going, is a 2014 American black comedy drama film directed by Courteney Cox, in her second directorial effort, from a screenplay written by David Flebotte, starring Seann William Scott, Elisha Cuthbert, Olivia Thirlby, Garret Dillahunt, and Kate Walsh.

The film premiered at the Tribeca Film Festival on April 24, 2014, and it was released in select theaters on April 24, 2015.

== Plot ==
Pet store manager Ted Morgan spirals into depression after his wife Penny leaves him, and he decides to commit suicide. First, he wants to tie up some loose ends. He moves in with his brother Lucky and his family and confronts his elderly seventh-grade teacher, who was abusive towards him, even though she is suffering from dementia in a home for the elderly. When Ted meets her granddaughter, Greta, he confides his plan to her and she takes an interest. She wants to document his life leading up to his suicide. He then confronts his childhood bully, Rawly, who apologizes for the way he treated Ted and wants to make amends. He finds out that Rawly's wife died of an aneurysm, leaving him behind with a mentally disabled child, and the two become friends. He sleeps with his high school crush Vickie, who is married with five children. She leaves her family for him, but he eventually tells her he doesn't want a relationship, which hurts her deeply. Ted's nephew Zeke comes out to him as gay and confides that he is afraid that his father would disown him if he knew. Ted comforts Greta after her grandmother dies, and she tries to kiss him. He backs away, however, reminding her that he will be dead soon. She gets angry, and accuses him of "running away". He learns her mother committed suicide, which is why she is interested in his story. After beating up his secret boyfriend Romeo after succumbing to peer pressure from his homophobic friends, Zeke goes to kill himself by jumping off a cliff next to a large lake. Ted and the rest of the family try to talk him down, but he slips and falls off the cliff. Ted and Lucky jump after him, saving the boy's life. Ted is knocked unconscious and has a dream in which his long-dead father tells him how important living is. Ted is pulled out of the lake and recovers. With a new lease on life, he decides to stay in town and start a new relationship with Greta.

== Cast ==
- Seann William Scott as Ted Morgan
- Olivia Thirlby as Greta
- Garret Dillahunt as "Lucky" Morgan
- Kate Walsh as Kathleen Morgan
- Kyle Gallner as Zeke Morgan
- Rob Riggle as Rawly Stansfield
- Evan Ross as Romeo Semple
- Cleo King as Berta
- Missi Pyle as Officer C.T.
- Elisha Cuthbert as Penny Morgan
- Mackenzie Marsh as Vickie
- Connie Stevens as Nancy Morgan
- David Arquette as Albert, Vickie's husband
- Clancy Brown as Ted's Father
- Jack Quaid as Dylan

== Release ==
The premiere took place at the 2014 Tribeca Film Festival. The film was released in select theaters on April 24, 2015, before a video on demand, digital store, DVD and Blu-ray release on May 12, 2015.

== Reception ==
Rotten Tomatoes, a review aggregator, reports that 9% of 11 surveyed critics gave the film a positive review; the average rating was 2.5/10. Metacritic rated it 24/100 based on six reviews.

Justin Chang of Variety called it "a dismal, tonally disastrous small-town farce". Frank Scheck of The Hollywood Reporter described it as "a serious misfire" whose tonal shifts would be difficult for a veteran director to manage. Ethan Alter of Film Journal International wrote, "Cox must have seen something in this screenplay that encouraged her to film it, but whatever that critical element was, it’s not apparent in the finished product." Stephen Holden of The New York Times wrote that the film "lurches along a wobbly line between salacious comic nastiness and nauseating sentimentality" without properly integrating them into a cohesive whole. Joe Neumaier of the New York Daily News wrote: "Courteney Cox's misbegotten project is a comedy-drama that, to Cox's credit, doesn't feel at all like a TV sitcom. The former "Friends" star clearly wanted something special, but sadly the result is ... this." In one of the few positive reviews the film received, Gary Goldstein of the Los Angeles Times wrote, "Anchored by a nicely understated performance by Seann William Scott, Just Before I Go effectively juggles a wealth of genuine, at times profound, emotion with quite a bit of nutty-raunchy humor."
