= Monster in the Closet =

1987 horror comedy film by Bob Dahlin

- DVD cover for 'Monster in the Closet'
- Directed by: Bob Dahlin
- Written by: Bob Dahlin
- Produced by: Peter L. Bergquist; Michel Billot; Terrence Corey; David Levy; Robert Rock
- Starring: Donald Grant; Denise DuBarry; Claude Akins; Howard Duff; Henry Gibson; Donald Moffat; Paul Dooley; John Carradine; Frank Ashmore; Paul Walker; Jesse White; Stella Stevens
- Cinematography: Ronald W. MacLeish
- Edited by: Mark Conte; Raja Gosnell; Stephanie Palewski; Jacque Elaine Toberen
- Music by: Barrie Guard
- Distributed by: Troma Entertainment
- Release date: October 31, 1986
- Running time: 89 minutes
- Country: United States
- Language: English

Monster in the Closet is a 1986 horror comedy with a veteran cast, including Howard Duff and John Carradine, as well as Stacy Ferguson and Paul Walker in early roles. The film was distributed by Troma Entertainment. In the GotchaMovies article "Final Destinations and Killer Condoms", Monster in the Closet was selected as the 8th greatest moment in teen slasher history. The film was directed and written by Bob Dahlin.

== Plot ==
In the small town of Chestnut Hills, California, three people are murdered in their closets by an unseen figure. Richard Clark, a struggling reporter at a news agency in San Francisco, learns of the murders through his snarky rival coworker, Scoop Johnson. Thinking this could be his big breakthrough, Richard goes to Chestnut Hills to investigate the murders and find out who is responsible. Upon arriving, Richard meets local biology teacher Diane Bennett and her young son, "Professor".

Richard and the town sheriff, Sam Ketchem, investigate the sorority house where the first victim was killed. Meanwhile, a woman in the building next door witnesses her husband being killed by a creature with sharp claws hiding in their closet. Hearing her screams, Richard and Ketchem quickly go to investigate, and Richard finds one of the creature's large claws on the ground near to the man's body. Later, Richard meets with Diane at the college she teaches at and shows her the fingernail. Diane gives the claw to her colleague Dr. Pennyworth and tells him to have a look at it.

That night, Richard goes over to Diane's house to have dinner with her, Professor, Dr. Pennyworth, and Diane's priest brother, Father Finnegan. Suddenly, they hear a couple from a neighbouring house scream and run outside, claiming they were attacked by a monster. The police are quickly brought in, whereupon they witness a large, scaly monster burst out of the house and murder Ketchem. With the monster proving invulnerable to bullets, the officers retreat as the monster makes its escape.

News of the monster's rampage quickly becomes widespread, and Chestnut Hills is put on lockdown as the military is sent in to deal with the monster. After listening to an audio recording of the monster's screech made by Professor, Pennyworth gets the idea to use a glockenspiel in an attempt to "communicate" with the monster. He, Richard, Diane, and Father Finnegan head out to look for the monster, and are later joined by Scoop, who came to town in order to "congratulate" Richard. However, they encounter a soldier, who puts them under arrest. The group are scolded by General Turnbull, but, upon learning that the monster is approaching the local elementary school, realise that Professor is in danger. Turnbull and the group hurry to the school and manage to save Professor at the last minute.

Turnbull's army arrive at the school, but Pennyworth, insistent that they keep the monster alive for scientific purposes, runs towards the monster before the soldiers can harm it. Pennyworth tries to communicate and make peace with the monster, only to get himself killed. The army opens fire, but the monster is left unharmed, and the soldiers flee.

As the residents of Chestnut Hills evacuate the town on the orders of the military, Diane realises that they might be able to kill the monster by using electricity, having earlier learned from Pennyworth that the monster's claw that Richard found is largely composed of electrons. She tries offering her idea to General Turnbull, but he refuses to believe her. After the military leave, Richard and Diane go to the latter's house and construct a trap made of scrap metal and electric wires. With some difficulty, the two manage to lure the monster into their trap, When they activate it, however, the monster is left unharmed by the electricity and destroys their trap. Richard and Diane flee into the attic, and prepare to accept their fate—after Richard's glasses fall off, however, the monster sees Richard's face and, having fallen in love with him, picks him up and takes him outside.

Diane, as a last resort, makes an appearance on live TV and tells people to destroy their closets in order to prevent the monster from being able to rejuvenate itself. Meanwhile, the monster arrives in San Francisco and takes Richard into the Transamerica Pyramid, which contains the only closet that hasn't been destroyed. However, the monster is unable to fit itself and Richard inside, and, having run out of energy, it staggers out of the building and dies. As Diane, Professor, Father Finnegan and various news reporters and police officers swarm Richard, one reporter makes a remark about how the closets became the monster's undoing. In response, Father Finnegan says "Oh, no. It wasn't the closet. It was Beauty killed the Beast."

== Cast ==
- Donald Grant as Richard Clark
- Denise DuBarry as Professor Diane Bennett
- Henry Gibson as Dr. Phillip Pennyworth
- Howard Duff as Father Martin Finnegan
- Donald Moffat as General Franklin D. Turnbull
- Paul Walker as "Professor" Bennett
- Claude Akins as Sheriff Sam Ketchem
- Frank Ashmore as Scoop Johnson
- Jesse White as Ben Bernstein
- Stella Stevens as Margo
- Paul Dooley as Roy
- Stacy Ferguson as Lucy
- Clare Torao as Television Newscaster (credited as Clare Nono)
- John Carradine as Old Joe Shempter
- Kevin Peter Hall as The Monster

== Release ==
=== Home media ===
Monster in the Closet was released on VHS by Troma Team Video in 1995. It was released for the first time on DVD by Troma on November 10, 1998. It was last released by Hollywood DVD on December 18, 2003.

== 'Monster in the closet' book ==
Applehead Team, a publisher from Spain, published a book in 2021 titled El monstruo (que salió) del armario ("The monster (that came out) of the closet"). This book written by Octavio López Sanjuán, which took five years of research and dozens of interviews with those involved.
