= Parts: The Clonus Horror =

1979 film

- Theatrical release poster
- Directed by: Robert S. Fiveson
- Screenplay by: Bob Sullivan; Ron Smith; Adaptation: Myrl A. Schreibman; Robert S. Fiveson
- Story by: Bob Sullivan
- Produced by: Robert S. Fiveson; Myrl A. Schreibman
- Starring: Tim Donnelly; Paulette Breen; Dick Sargent; Peter Graves; Keenan Wynn; Frank Ashmore
- Cinematography: Max Beaufort
- Edited by: Robert Gordon
- Music by: Hod David Schudson
- Distributed by: Group 1 International Distribution Organization Ltd.
- Release date: August 1979 (U.S.)
- Running time: 90 minutes
- Country: United States
- Language: English
- Budget: $350,000
- Box office: $3 million ($1,680,000 theatrical rentals)

Parts: The Clonus Horror (also known as The Clonus Horror, or simply Clonus) is a 1979 science fiction horror film directed, co-written and produced by Robert S. Fiveson, and starring Peter Graves, Tim Donnelly, Dick Sargent, Keenan Wynn, Paulette Breen and Frank Ashmore. The film is about an isolated desert community where clones are bred to serve as a source of replacement organs for the wealthy and powerful.

An independent production, Parts was released in the United States in August 1979. It was nominated at the 7th Saturn Awards for "Best Film Produced for Under $1,000,000". It gained further recognition after being featured on the comedy television series Mystery Science Theater 3000 in 1997.

In 2005, the filmmakers filed a lawsuit against DreamWorks Pictures for copyright infringement, citing numerous similarities between Clonus and the Michael Bay film The Island. The two parties reached a seven-figure settlement, the terms of which were sealed by the court.

== Plot ==
The film takes place in an isolated desert compound called Clonus, where clones are bred as replacement parts for the elite, including a soon-to-be president-elect Jeffrey Knight. The clones are kept isolated from the real world by workers at the colony, but work toward being "accepted" to move to "America" after completing some type of physical training. After a clone is chosen to go to "America," they are given a party and a farewell celebration with their fellow clones. The chosen clone is then taken to a lab where they are sedated and placed in an airtight plastic bag, and their body is frozen to preserve their organs for harvest. Clones with orange ear tags have been given lobotomies to make them childlike and docile.

A clone named Richard has a silver tag and a normal intellect. He questions his existence and eventually escapes the colony after discovering the truth. Pursued by compound guards, he enters a nearby city, where he is found by retired journalist Jake Noble and his wife. Jake takes him to Richard Knight, the man Richard is cloned from, and Jeffrey Knight's brother. The Knights argue over what to do with the clone, who is revealed to have been secretly commissioned by Jeffrey.

After a falling out, Richard's clone returns to the colony to reunite with his love interest, Lena, whom he'd related to because she was also raised with an unhindered intellect. To his horror, he finds that Lena has been lobotomized by those running the colony. Once they have him in custody, they kill and freeze him. Meanwhile, Clonus completes its cover-up by sending a group of men, along with Jeffrey, to murder Richard Knight and his son (the Nobles are also assassinated with a bomb). Jeffrey Knight is stabbed through the chest in the ensuing struggle with his brother, but he later appears fine at a press conference, where he is introduced by Sen. George Walker, who conspicuously wears an eyepatch. Knight is stunned to find that Noble had, before his death, managed to disseminate a secret tape that Clone Richard took from Clonus to the news media, exposing the project.

The final shot shows Richard's frozen corpse with an open chest and a tear coming out of his eye.

== Cast ==
- Peter Graves as Jeffrey Knight
- Tim Donnelly as Clone Richard Knight
- Dick Sargent as Dr. Jameson
- Keenan Wynn as Jake Noble
- Paulette Breen as Lena
- David Hooks as Richard Knight
- James Mantell as Richard "Ricky" Knight Jr.
- Frank Ashmore as George Walker
- George P. Wilbur as Walker Man
- Lurene Tuttle as Anna Noble
- Eileen Dietz as Dana
- Zale Kessler as Dr. Nelson
- Rick DiAngelo, Eugene Robert Glazer, Keith Langsdale, and Larry Manning as Guides

== Production ==
Parts: The Clonus Horror was based on a screenplay by Bob Sullivan. The idea for the script came while Sullivan was taking a screenwriting class at the University of Southern California taught by Irwin Blacker, a story editor for Bonanza. The film was directed by Sullivan's classmate Robert S. Fiveson, his first and to-date only feature film as director.

Production began in Southern California in September 1978 with a budget of $350,000. In exchange for making a donation to the Junior Chamber of Commerce, the town of Simi Valley, California was rented for the picture. Students from a local college received class credit for working on the film. On-screen credit was given to people who offered the production crew dinner, tennis shoes, and bicycles.

The original title Robert Fiveson intended was "Clonus". The film distributor meanwhile wanted it to be called "Parts", much to the protest of Fiveson. Eventually the two titles were combined to make it Parts: The Clonus Horror. The Clonus compound was shot at the then new campus for Moorpark College in Moorpark, California. Additional outdoor shots were filmed at the California Lutheran University quad near Alumni Hall.

== Release ==
At the end of 1979, the film had made $1,680,000 in domestic theatrical rentals, with an overall gross of almost $3,000,000.

The film has been released by Mondo Macabro under the title Clonus.

=== Reception ===
Blockbuster Entertainment gave the film two stars, calling it an "Interesting suspenser". Leonard Maltin's Movie Guide also gave it two stars, describing it as "Watchable, but uninspired". VideoHound's Golden Movie Retriever by Jim Craddock gave it one and a half stars. John Kenneth Muir called it "A compelling low-budget film that despite lapses in taste and style has the sweet odor of paranoia all over it." Robert C. Trussell for The Kansas City Star praised the cast and its social commentary, saying it deserved cult classic status. Linda Gross from The Los Angeles Times gave praise to the film's cinematography and art direction.

Fangoria gave it three stars. While criticizing the acting and writing as "awkward", praise was given for its political subtext in the film. Time Out called the film a "Competent and engrossing sci-fi thriller in the Coma vein", speaking positively of its ethics. TV Guide gave the movie two stars, saying it was undermined by its budget and was derivative of Coma, Logan's Run, and These Are the Damned. In 1980, the film won the "Best Film Produced for Under $1,000,000" category at the 7th Saturn Awards.

=== Mystery Science Theater 3000 ===
Parts: The Clonus Horror was featured in an eighth-season episode of Mystery Science Theater 3000 (MST3K), a comedy television series whose premise is that the character Mike Nelson and his two robot friends Crow T. Robot and Tom Servo are forced to watch bad films as part of an ongoing scientific experiment. The episode aired on the Sci-Fi Channel in June 1997. In 2007, Rhino Video released the MST3K episode as part of the "Volume 12" DVD collection of the series along with The Rebel Set, Secret Agent Super Dragon, and The Starfighters. The DVD release of the MST3K episode includes an interview with Fiveson, who discusses the production of Clonus and the Island lawsuit. Though hesitant about it for the first five minutes, director Robert Fiveson said that he felt "honored" that the film made it onto the show. Shout! Factory re-released the boxset in 2019.

== Copyright infringement lawsuit ==
The big-budget 2005 DreamWorks production The Island, also about a colony that breeds clones to harvest organs for the elite, mirrors Clonus in a number of ways. The makers of Clonus filed suit, claiming copyright infringement. On August 25, 2006, the court presiding over this case ruled that it could proceed to trial. When asked about the similarities, former MST3K host Michael J. Nelson called The Island a "pale copy of Parts: The Clonus Horror."

According to a 2007 interview with Clonus screenwriter Bob Sullivan, DreamWorks and Clonus Associates reached a settlement, the specific terms of which are sealed. According to Sullivan, the amount settled on was in the seven-figure range.
