= Frank Ashmore =

American actor

- Born: 1945 (age 80–81); El Paso, Texas, United States
- Occupation: Actor
- Years active: 1960–present

Frank Ashmore is an American actor.

== Career ==
He is perhaps best known for his role as "Martin" in the 1983 NBC miniseries V and its 1984 sequel V: The Final Battle. He reprised his role in the pilot episode of V: The Series—and as Martin's brother "Philip" (A Supreme Commander appointed to investigate the murder of Supreme Commander "Charles", who had married V villainess "Diana" and died on the wedding night from a poisoned drink; he later became a "Fifth Columnist" like Martin).

Ashmore appeared in the 1980 hit comedy film Airplane!, Airplane II: The Sequel and films such as Gable and Lombard (1976), Invisible Strangler (1978), Parts: The Clonus Horror (1979) and Monster in the Closet (1986). In 1981, he appeared on both Days of Our Lives as a hit man out to kill Julie Williams and General Hospital as Monica Quartermaine's private investigator. He also had a supporting role in the 2012 independent thriller Extracted. He made guest appearances on various television shows including Happy Days, The Bob Newhart Show, Battlestar Galactica, Touched by an Angel, The West Wing and the current version of Hawaii Five-O. In 2010, he had a recurring role in season 4 of The Guild. He voiced Jimmy the Grape in the video game The Darkness II. He voiced Leone "Leo" Galante in the 2010 video game Mafia II, and its sequel Mafia III. He also voiced Austin Buckell in the 2013 video game Dead Space 3.

== Awards ==
Ashmore won the Los Angeles Drama Critics Circle Award for Featured Performance in 2005. In 2009, he was nominated for Best Actor by the 168 Hour Film Project, a Christian film festival, for the short Stealing Home.

== Filmography ==
=== Film ===
Year	Title	Role	Notes
1974	Black Eye	Chess	Credited as Frank Stell
1976	Gable and Lombard	Ragland	Credited as Frank Stell
1978	Invisible Strangler	Roger Sands	
1979	Parts: The Clonus Horror	George Walker	
1980	Airplane!	Victor Basta	
1982	Airplane II: The Sequel	Controller #3	
1986	Monster in the Closet	Scoop	
2007	Game of Life	Rick	
2011	A Letter to Momo	Sachio Sadahama (voice)	English dub
2012	Extracted	Martino	
2012	I Will Follow You Into the Dark	Mr. Carter	
2012	It's Not That Simple	Dr. Edwards	
2012	Bigfoot: The Lost Coast Tapes	Carl Drybeck	
2015	400 Days	Garcia	

=== Television ===
Year	Title	Role	Notes
1972	Alias Smith and Jones	Guard	Episode: "The Day the Amnesty Came Through"
1972	The Sixth Sense	Intern	Episode: "The Eyes That Wouldn't Die"
1973	Banacek	Airline Clerk	Episode: "The Greatest Collection of Them All"
1974	The Streets of San Francisco	Sniper	Episode: "Crossfire"
1974	Happy Days	Johnny	Episode: "Wish Upon a Star"
1975	Petrocelli	Alec McCaslin	Episode: "The Kidnapping"
1975	The ABC Afternoon Playbreak	Mark Linden	Episode: "The Girl Who Couldn't Lose"
1978	The Next Step Beyond	Peter Holmby	Episode: "The Pact"
1978	The Bob Newhart Show	Major Hartman, Phil Morgan	Episode: "Group on a Hot Tin Roof"
1978–80	Barnaby Jones	Ted Goff, Donald Forest	2 episodes
1979	Battlestar Galactica	Flight Sergeant Ortega	Episode: "Murder on the Rising Star"
1979	Trapper John, M.D.	Bolen	Episode: "Taxi in the Rain"
1979, 1981	CHiPs	Larry Fletcher, Lance	2 episodes
1980	Laverne & Shirley	Bob Gatenby	Episode: "The Dating Game"
1981	Days of Our Lives	Brent Cavanaugh	Unknown episodes
1981	General Hospital	Corrigan	1 episode
1983	V	Martin	Miniseries
1984	The New Mike Hammer	Alex	2 episodes
1984	V: The Final Battle	Martin	Miniseries
1984–85	V: The Series	Philip, Martin	7 episodes
1985	T. J. Hooker	Carl David Beeman	Episode: "To Kill a Cop"
1986	Shadow Chasers	Miles	Episode: "Blood and Magnolias"
1987	Hunter	Carl Brand	Episode: "Night on Bald Mountain"
1987	L.A. Law	Bruce Wellman	Episode: "Brackman Vasektimized"
1998	Pensacola: Wings of Gold	Sheriff	Episode: "Solo Flight"
1998	The Practice	Mr. Mayfield	2 episodes
1999	Touched by an Angel	Mac	Episode: "The Man Upstairs"
2002	The District	Mr. Stockwell	Episode: "The Second Man"
2004	The West Wing	Congressman Chris Finn	Episode: "Full Disclosure"
2006	Criminal Minds	Henry Davin	Episode: "The Perfect Storm"
2008	The Shield	Cy	Episode: "Party Line"
2010	The Guild	Ollie	6 episodes
2012	Rizzoli & Isles	Ryan Finnegan	Episode: "Home Town Glory"
2014	Hawaii Five-0	Jeff Harrison	Episode: "Ke Koho Mamau Aku"
2017	Room 104	Older Patrick	Episode: "I Know You Weren't Dead"

=== Video games ===
Year	Title	Role
2010	Mafia II	Leo Galante
2012	The Darkness II	Jimmy the Grape, Dr. James
2013	Dead Space 3	Austin Buckell
2013	The Bureau: XCOM Declassified	Dr. Hara
2016	Mafia III	Leo Galante, Additional Voices
