= Denise DuBarry =

American actress and activist (1956-2019)

Denise DuBarry Hay
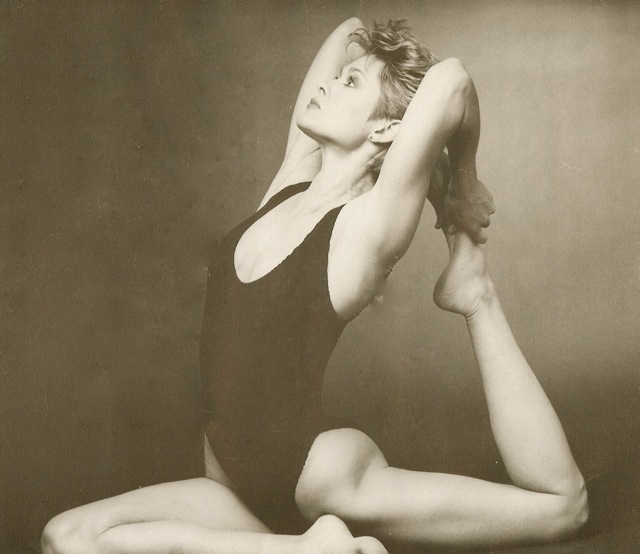
- DuBarry in 1989
- Born: March 6, 1956; Killeen, Texas, U.S.
- Died: March 23, 2019 (aged 63); Los Angeles, California, U.S.
- Occupations: Actress; film producer; businesswoman; philanthropist
- Spouses: Connolly Kamornick Oyler (m. 1975; div. 1976) Gary Lockwood (m. 1982; div. 1988) William Hay (m. 1992)
- Children: 4

Denise DuBarry Hay (March 6, 1956 – March 23, 2019) was an American actress, businesswoman, film producer, and philanthropist. She co-founded Thane International Inc., a direct response industry company, along with her husband, Bill Hay, in 1990. She served as its chief creative officer for 15 years, from 1990 to 2005. As an actress, she is best known for her role as nurse Lieutenant Samantha Green, on the television series Black Sheep Squadron, and as Johanna Franklin in the film Being There.

She was a pioneer in the infomercial industry as co-producer with Deborah Chenoweth of Play the Piano Overnight in 1988, which won the Billboard Music Award for Best Music Instruction Video that year, and then Play the Guitar Overnight, which won the 1991 Billboard Music Award for Best Music Instruction.

== Early life ==
DuBarry was born in Killeen, Texas, at Fort Hood Army Base, to Adrian Pierre DuBarry and his wife, Betty Louise (née King). Her parents moved back to Louisiana where they were from so that her father could finish his master's degree at LSU in Baton Rouge. The family later moved to Honduras, Mexico, Guatemala and Costa Rica, where DuBarry grew up from ages 2 to 10, and learned to speak fluent Spanish. The family moved throughout California, eventually settling in Granada Hills, California, where Denise attended middle school and high school. A child of divorce and the eldest of five children, at 14 she watched after her siblings while her mother worked.

== Yoga ==
DuBarry practiced yoga starting in 1979. She founded and owned Malibu Yoga in 1986, catering to a celebrity clientele. She gave the studio to a friend in 1990 when she relocated. She was a partner in Palm Desert, California's Bikram Yoga University Village Studio.

== Career ==
At age 18, she went to work for her father in his paper export business, DuBarry International, and took acting lessons at night with Milton Katselas and Charles E. Conrad. She was married briefly to her first husband, Connolly Kamornick Oyler, from late 1975 to 1976, when she started landing commercials for Michelob beer and Chevrolet Camaro, worked as an extra in the kid's shows Magic Mongo and Wonder Woman and made an appearance on The Gong Show and as a beauty contestant on "Ms. Hold the Mayo".

She competed in several real beauty contests, including Ms. Malibu, where she won "Most Photogenic". She was hired to co-star in a CBS Movie of the Week, Deadman's Curve. She landed a regular role in the second season of the NBC World War II television series Black Sheep Squadron and had bit-parts in popular television shows including Charlie's Angels. Trapper John, M.D. and Match Game '78. Director Hal Ashby cast her in a featured role in the 1979 film Being There.

Having previously acted together in the 1980 television movie Top of the Hill, DuBarry and husband Gary Lockwood formed a production company, Xebec Productions, in 1982, and she began writing and fundraising for film development and production while she continued to act. In 1985, she appeared in the cult film Monster in the Closet.

She met her future third husband Bill Hay through mutual friend Dick Robertson, then president of Warner Bros. Television Distribution. The couple formed and produced and distributed, Beat the Recession and a slew of other infomercials.

In 2005, DuBarry Hay founded Kaswit, Inc., a direct response marketing company. Two of Kaswit's top direct response projects are the infomercials "Pilates Power Gym" and "Secrets to Training the Perfect Dog" with Don Sullivan, "The DogFather". Through her production company, Blue Moxie Entertainment (founded 2006), she produced a feature film, Shoot the Hero, first shown at the 2010 Palm Springs International Film Festival.

== Filmography ==
Year	Title	Role	Notes
1978	Deadman's Curve	Susan	Credited as Denise Du Barry, TV film
1978	Skateboard	Official	
1979	Crisis in Mid-Air	Jenny Sterling	TV film
1979	Fast Friends	Marcy	TV film
1979	The Darker Side of Terror	Ann Sweeney	TV film
1979	Being There	Johanna Franklin	
1980	Top of the Hill	Maria von Taub	TV film
1981	The Devil and Max Devlin	Stella's Secretary	
1986	Beyond Reason	Girl	
1985	KGB: The Secret War	Adèle Martin	
1986	Monster in the Closet	Prof. Diane Bennett	
2017	Do It or Die	Elaine Chaddick	
2019	Walk to Vegas	Denise	
2021	Senior Moment	Golfer	

== Death ==
DuBarry died at UCLA Medical Center on March 23, 2019, at the age of 63. Her third husband, Bill Hay, confirmed that DuBarry Hay died after contracting a rare fungal illness called Candida auris. DuBarry was survived by her husband and her four children, actress Samantha Lockwood (from her second marriage, to Gary Lockwood), Adam Hay, Kyle Hay and Whitney Hay, as well as her parents, Pete DuBarry and Betty DuBarry Stein.
