= Static (2012 film) =

- Film poster
- Directed by: Todd Levin
- Written by: John Suits; Gabriel Cowan
- Produced by: Gabriel Cowan
- Starring: Sara Paxton; Sarah Shahi; Milo Ventimiglia
- Release date: November 1, 2012
- Running time: 83 minutes
- Country: United States
- Language: English

Static is a 2012 horror film directed by Todd Levin and starring Sara Paxton and Milo Ventimiglia.

== Plot ==
Jonathan Dade (Ventimiglia), a novelist, and his wife Addie (Shahi) live in a large house in the middle of nowhere. Their three-year-old son died in an accident some time ago and they are having a hard time forgiving themselves and moving on. One night, a strange woman named Rachel (Paxton) comes knocking on their front door, saying that her car broke down and that she was being followed by strange figures wearing gas masks. Jonathan and Addie are kind and take her in for the night. Some time later, intruders come to the house and take Rachel away. Then they come after Jonathan and Addie.

Jonathan and Addie flee from largely invisible intruders wearing gas masks and hoodies. Then they leave the house, run into the garden, then into the garage, then into the forest, and back to the house again. It is revealed at the end that Jonathan and Addie are ghosts and later, we realize that Rachel and her gas-masked crew are something like ghost hunters who clean haunted houses from spirits that won't leave.
