= Director's statement =

Statement by a film's director providing creative context

A director's statement is a written description in which a film director explains the motive and vision behind making a particular film. It is usually included in a proposal to producers or financiers, or in press material made available for distributors, film festival programmers, journalists, and critics.

== See also ==
- Artist's statement
