= 3 Nights in the Desert =

- Directed by: Gabriel Cowan
- Written by: Adam Chanzit
- Produced by: John Suits; Gabriel Cowan
- Starring: Amber Tamblyn; Wes Bentley; Vincent Piazza
- Cinematography: Jonathan Bruno
- Edited by: Seth Clark
- Music by: Nora Kirkpatrick; Mark Noseworthy; Tim Ziesmer
- Production company: New Artists Alliance
- Distributed by: Monterey Media (US)
- Release date: January 4, 2014 (Palm Springs International Film Festival)
- Running time: 90 minutes
- Country: United States
- Language: English

3 Nights in the Desert is a 2014 American drama film directed by Gabriel Cowan, written by Adam Chanzit, and starring Amber Tamblyn, Wes Bentley, and Vincent Piazza.

The film premiered on January 4, 2014, at the Palm Springs International Film Festival followed by a screening on October 18, 2014, at the Twin Cities Film Festival. The film will be given a limited release in early 2015.

== Premise ==
The drama follows three estranged friends who reunite to celebrate turning 30 years old, while also reminiscing about how they almost made it as a rock band.

== Cast ==
- Amber Tamblyn as Anna
- Wes Bentley as Travis
- Vincent Piazza as Barry

== Release ==
The film had a US theatrical release in early 2015 followed by the DVD and VOD release.

=== Festivals ===
3 Nights in the Desert was selected to screen at the following film festivals:

- 2014 Palm Springs International Film Festival
- 2014 Twin Cities Film Fest

== Reception ==
Dennis Harvey of Variety wrote that "the characters, situations and dialogue too seldom escape cliche in Gabriel Cowan’s watchable but unmemorable feature". Stephen Farber of The Hollywood Reporter wrote, "This limp drama about a band's reunion never sings or soars."
