= Gabriel Cowan =

American film director, producer, and composer

- Education: California Institute of the Arts
- Occupations: Director; Composer; Film producer
- Parent: Geoffrey Cowan
- Family: Paul Cowan (uncle); Louis G. Cowan (paternal grandfather); Polly Spiegel Cowan (paternal grandmother); Joseph Spiegel (great-great-grandfather)

Gabriel Cowan is an American film director, composer and film producer. He has made documentaries, horror films, dramas, and comedies.

== Career ==
Gabriel Cowan was originally a musician. At 18, he worked with Robbie Robertson to score the film Jimmy Hollywood and signed a contract with Geffen Records. He later formed a band with David Arquette that helped score Scream 2 and Scream 3. After an unfulfilling career in which he scored television commercials, Cowan returned to school and graduated with a master's degree in film directing. While at CalArts, he co-wrote and co-directed Breathing Room with John Suits, whom he met at film school. He also directed, shot, and produced Flower in the Gun Barrel, a documentary that explores the complexities of forgiveness and reconciliation in post genocide Rwanda. The film is produced by Amiee Clark and Monica Forouzesh, and is narrated by Martin Sheen. After graduating, Cowan directed Growth, which became the number one horror rental on iTunes. Cowan and Suits then collaborated on Extracted and Static.

In 2012, Cowan directed and produced 3 Nights in the Desert. With New Artists Alliance, which he formed with Suits, he produced Bad Milo!, The Scribbler, and Cheap Thrills.

In 2013, Cowan produced Just Before I Go, Courteney Cox's directorial debut.

== Personal life ==
Cowan grew up in Los Angeles. His grandfather created The $64,000 Question, and Spike Jonze is his 3rd cousin. Cowan's great-great-grandfather was Joseph Spiegel, the founder of the Spiegel Catalog. His great-grandfather, Modie J. Spiegel, eventually took over the catalog in 1893. Modie's brother, Arthur Spiegel, was the great-grandfather of Spike Jonze and Sam Spiegel. His aunt was Rachel Cowan, the first female convert to Judaism to be ordained as a rabbi in Reform Judaism.
