= Growth (film) =

- Promotional poster
- Directed by: Gabriel Cowan
- Written by: Gabriel Cowan
- Produced by: Amiee Clark
- Starring: Mircea Monroe
- Edited by: John Suits
- Music by: Tim Ziesmer
- Production company: New Artists Alliance
- Distributed by: Free Dolphin Entertainment; SP Films; Anchor Bay Entertainment
- Release date: January 18, 2010
- Running time: 90 minutes
- Country: United States
- Language: English

Growth is a 2010 American horror film written and directed by Gabriel Cowan.

== Plot ==
In 1989 on Cuttyhunk Island, scientist Mason Lane used microscopic parasites to advance human evolution. The experiment resulted in stronger, smarter, healthier humans, but something went wrong and three quarters of the island's residents died.

20 years later, teenagers Jamie, Kristen, Marco, and Justin, take a boat ride to Cuttyhunk Island. Jamie, whose father spearheaded the original project which created the parasites, begins having flashbacks about the project and its effect on her family. She receives a visit from Larkin, another scientist on the project, who informs her that she will be losing money from her inheritance of Cuttyhunk. Meanwhile, Kristen and Justin are outside chopping wood and begin to flirt. They walk by a river and Kristen says if Justin treads water and sees a bird, then he'll get "whatever you want.” As he heads out to the river, a mysterious figure at the other end of the riverbank sends one of the parasites after him and Justin is infected. Kristen runs back to Jamie and Marco and tells them something is wrong with Justin. The trio return to Justin, who is convulsing, pick him up, and take him back to his room. Justin makes a full recovery with his senses drastically heightened.

Justin heads to a local bar, where he gets into a fight. His heightened abilities enable him to win easily. Justin makes out with his opponent's girlfriend until he begins to choke and rip out part of her neck. He awakens the next morning, unsure whether it was a dream or not.

Kristen finds a large cemetery of numerous individuals, all dated 1989, and the mysterious figure attacks her and shoves the parasite in his mouth down hers.

Marco and Jamie meet Larkin and another scientist, Dr. Macavire, who ask to see Justin. When Jamie and Marco run away to warn Justin, Jamie is kidnapped by the mysterious figure and taken back to his house. Justin finds Kristen's mutilated body as the militia approach him. Justin kills the militia men and Marco is killed in the crossfire. A policeman notices a parasite sliding back up Dr. Macavire's leg and shoots him.

The mysterious figure reveals himself to be Mason Lane, Jamie's father, who explains he developed an antidote formula. Jamie escapes with the antidote to combat him and alert Larkin. Jamie douses Mason in salt water, killing him and releasing the parasites within him. Larkin and Jamie escape the laboratory as the parasites swarm after them. Larkin reveals that Dr. Macavire was trying to lure Jamie with suggestions of inheritance of the island, assuming that Jamie had carried the antidote with her.

Larkin tells Jamie to get one of the boats to escape, but Justin emerges to stop them. Justin kills Larkin and pleads with Jamie not to leave him on the island. Jamie escapes without him, only to discover she is infected as well. She jumps into the sea to destroy the parasites.

An epilogue set in South Korea six months later suggests the parasites are still active.

== Release ==
Anchor Bay Entertainment released Growth on DVD September 7, 2010.

== Reception ==
Bloody Disgusting rated it 2.5/5 stars and compared it negatively to Shivers, Splinter, Slither, and Night of the Creeps. Paul Pritchard of DVD Verdict called it "a flawed but entertaining low-budget movie" that, while better than most direct-to-video horror, pales in comparison to Shivers. Annie Riordan of Brutal as Hell called it an incoherent film full of stereotypical and clichéd characters. Justin Felix of DVD Talk rated it 3/5 stars and wrote, "Growth has some issues with pacing – and believability, though given the genre that's almost a given – in its script. However, a strong cast (including an especially good performance by Nora Kirkpatrick in a main supporting role) and plentiful CG parasite mayhem make the film worthwhile for the horror crowd."
