= XLrator Media =

American film distributor

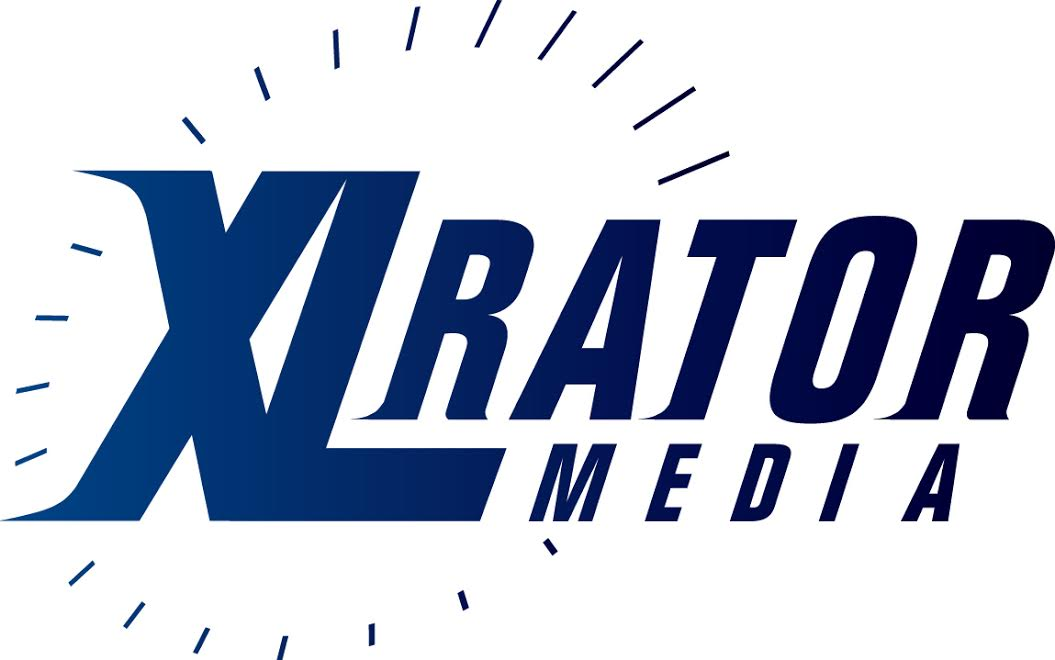
- Company type: Private
- Industry: Film
- Founded: April 2010 in Los Angeles, California, US
- Founder: Barry Gordon
- Headquarters: Los Angeles, California, US
- Area served: US
- Key people: Barry Gordon (CEO)
- Brands: Turbo, Screamfest, Macabre, Lifeline
- Services: Film distribution, film production

XLrator Media is an American independent film distributor headquartered in Los Angeles, California. The CEO is Barry Gordon, who founded the company in April 2010. In 2014, they began offering film production services in partnership with other companies.

== History ==
Barry Gordon founded XLRator Media in April 2010. XLrator acts as a releasing company and partners with ARC Entertainment for the physical distribution. Gordon said that their market is films with an acquisition cost in "the low-seven-figure range". In 2012, XLrator launched the label Turbo for international action films, partnered with Screamfest Horror Film Festival to create a horror-themed label curated by them, and created their own genre film label, Macabre. In 2014, XLrator partnered with New Artists Alliance to co-produce and distribute three science fiction films, and in 2015, they partnered with RNR to co-produce and distribute three action-thriller films. The same year, the Macabre label was made available on Hulu, an online video service. In 2016, they partnered with Rugged Entertainment to create the Lifeline documentary label and partnered with Blue Fox Entertainment to distribute fifteen genre films per year, starting in October 2016.
