= Lopatin (surname) =

Lopatin (Russian: Лопатин), from lopata meaning spade, according to Boris Unbegaun (cf. surnames Lopatto, Lopata, Lopato), or from the Galician toponym Lopatyn, according to Heinrich Guggenheimer, is a surname which historically was common among Galician Jews and Karaites. In Russian, its feminine counterpart is Lopatina. It may refer to

- Aleksei Lopatin (born 1985), Russian association football player
- Anton Lopatin (1897–1965), Soviet military officer during World War II
- Asher Lopatin (born 1964), American rabbi
- Daniel Lopatin (born 25 July 1982), American electronic musician, known professionally as Oneohtrix Point Never
- German Lopatin (1845–1918), Russian revolutionary
- Leo Mikhailovich Lopatin (1855–1920), Russian philosopher
- Sergey Lopatin (disambiguation)
- Vladimir Lopatin (born 1931), Soviet Olympic swimmer
- Yevgeny Lopatin (1917–2011), Soviet weightlifter
- Ekaterina Mikhailovna Lopatina (1865–1935), Russian writer
- Viktoria Lopatina (born 1981), Belarusian cross-country skier

== See also ==
- Lopatin
