= Rahm Emanuel =

American politician and diplomat (born 1959)

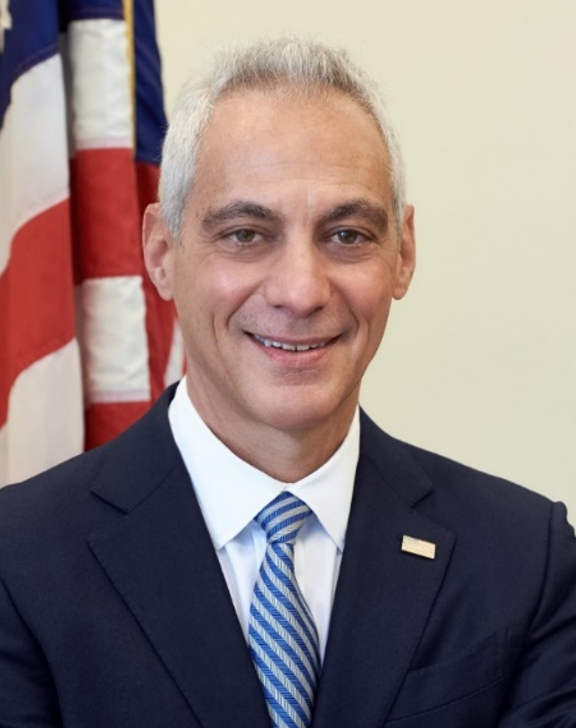
- Official portrait, 2022

31st United States Ambassador to Japan
- In office March 25, 2022 – January 15, 2025
- President: Joe Biden
- Preceded by: Bill Hagerty (2019)
- Succeeded by: George Glass

55th Mayor of Chicago
- In office May 16, 2011 – May 20, 2019
- Deputy: Ray Suarez; Brendan Reilly
- Preceded by: Richard M. Daley
- Succeeded by: Lori Lightfoot

23rd White House Chief of Staff
- In office January 20, 2009 – October 1, 2010
- President: Barack Obama
- Deputy: Mona Sutphen; Jim Messina
- Preceded by: Joshua Bolten
- Succeeded by: Pete Rouse (acting)

Member of the U.S. House of Representatives from Illinois's 5th district
- In office January 3, 2003 – January 2, 2009
- Preceded by: Rod Blagojevich
- Succeeded by: Mike Quigley
House positions
Chair of the House Democratic Caucus
In office January 3, 2007 – January 2, 2009
Deputy	John B. Larson
Leader	Nancy Pelosi
Preceded by	Jim Clyburn
Succeeded by	John B. Larson
Chair of the Democratic Congressional Campaign Committee
In office January 3, 2005 – January 3, 2007
Preceded by	Bob Matsui
Succeeded by	Chris Van Hollen

Senior Advisor to the President
- In office January 20, 1993 – November 7, 1998
- President: Bill Clinton
- Preceded by: Position established
- Succeeded by: Doug Sosnik

White House Director of Political Affairs
- In office January 20, 1993 – June 23, 1993
- President: Bill Clinton
- Preceded by: Janet Mullins
- Succeeded by: Joan Baggett

Personal details
- Born: Rahm Israel Emanuel; November 29, 1959 (age 66) Chicago, Illinois, U.S.
- Party: Democratic
- Spouse: Amy Rule (m. 1994)
- Children: 3
- Relatives: Ari Emanuel (brother); Ezekiel Emanuel (brother)
- Education: Sarah Lawrence College (BA); Northwestern University (MA)
- Emanuel's voice Emanuel's opening statement at his confirmation hearing to be U.S. ambassador to Japan; Recorded October 20, 2021

Rahm Israel Emanuel (/rɑːm/; born November 29, 1959) is an American politician, diplomat, and political commentator. A member of the Democratic Party, he represented Illinois in the U.S. House of Representatives for three terms. Emanuel was the White House chief of staff from 2009 to 2010 under President Barack Obama and served as mayor of Chicago from 2011 to 2019. He served as United States ambassador to Japan from 2022 to 2025.

Born in Chicago, Emanuel is a graduate of Sarah Lawrence College (BA) and Northwestern University (MA). Early in his career, Emanuel served as director of the finance committee for Bill Clinton's 1992 presidential campaign. In 1993, he joined the Clinton administration, where he served as assistant to the president for political affairs and as senior advisor to the president for policy and strategy. Emanuel worked at the investment bank Wasserstein Perella & Co. for two-and-a-half years and served on the board of directors of Freddie Mac. In 2002, he was elected to the congressional seat vacated by Rod Blagojevich, who had resigned to become governor of Illinois. Emanuel represented Illinois's 5th congressional district from 2003 to 2009. As chair of the Democratic Congressional Campaign Committee, he oversaw Democratic wins in the 2006 House elections, allowing the party to gain control of the chamber for the first time since 1994. Following the 2008 U.S. presidential election, President Barack Obama appointed Emanuel to serve as White House chief of staff.

In October 2010, Emanuel resigned as chief of staff to run for mayor of Chicago in 2011. Emanuel won with 55% of the vote over five other candidates in the non-partisan election and was re-elected in 2015. In late 2015, Emanuel's approval rating plunged to "the low 20s" in response to a series of scandals. In October 2017, Emanuel announced that he planned to run for a third term, but stated in September 2018 that he had changed his mind. The Chicago Tribune assessed Emanuel's performance as mayor as "mixed", and at one point, a survey found that half of Chicagoans favored Emanuel's resignation. He left office in May 2019 and was succeeded by Lori Lightfoot.

In August 2021, President Joe Biden nominated Emanuel to be the United States Ambassador to Japan; he was confirmed by the U.S. Senate in December of that year. Emanuel stepped down from the ambassadorship in January 2025, shortly before Biden left office.

== Early life and family ==
Emanuel's father, Benjamin M. Emanuel, was born in Jerusalem, where he was a member of the Irgun, a Zionist paramilitary organization that operated in Mandatory Palestine. He moved to the United States to work as a pediatrician at Michael Reese Hospital. The surname Emanuel (Hebrew: עמנואל) was adopted by their family in memory of Rahm's uncle (his father's brother) Emanuel Auerbach, who died of an infection after being hit by a stray bullet during a 1933 conflict between Arab protestors and the police in Mandatory Palestine.

Emanuel's maternal grandfather was a Moldovan Jew who emigrated from Bessarabia. His mother, Marsha (née Smulevitz), is the daughter of a West Side Chicago labor union organizer who worked in the civil rights movement. She briefly owned a local rock and roll club, and later became an adherent of Benjamin Spock's writings.

Emanuel's parents met during the 1950s in Chicago. Emanuel was born on November 29, 1959, in Chicago, Illinois. His first name, Rahm (רם) means high or lofty in Hebrew. He has been described by his older brother Ezekiel, an oncologist and bioethicist at the University of Pennsylvania, as "quiet and observant" as a child. Ari, his younger brother, is the CEO of Endeavor, an entertainment agency with headquarters in Beverly Hills, California. Emanuel also has a younger adopted sister, Shoshana.

== Education and ballet dance ==
Ezekiel Emanuel has written that his father "did not believe in falsely building his sons' self-esteem by purposefully letting us win, or tolerating sloppy play." About his brother Rahm, he also wrote:

"Though fiercely intelligent ... he was not naturally inclined to sit at a desk and put in extra effort to turn a B into an A. As my father often said, without noting that the phrase applied to himself at that same age, "Rahm always tries to get the maximum for the minimum."

While he lived in Chicago, Rahm Emanuel attended Bernard Zell Anshe Emet Day School in Lake View for elementary school. After his family moved to Wilmette, north of the city, Emanuel attended public schools: Romona School, Locust Junior High School, and New Trier High School. He and his brothers attended summer camp in Israel, including the summer following the June 1967 Six-Day War. While a high school student working part-time at an Arby's restaurant, Emanuel severely cut his right middle finger on a meat slicer, which was later infected from swimming in Lake Michigan. His finger was partially amputated due to the severity of the infection.

Emanuel was encouraged by his mother to take ballet lessons. He is a graduate of the Evanston School of Ballet, as well as a student of the Joel Hall Dance Center, where his children later took lessons. He won a scholarship to the Joffrey Ballet, but turned it down to attend Sarah Lawrence College, a liberal arts school with a strong dance program. While an undergraduate, Emanuel was elected to the Sarah Lawrence Student Senate. He graduated from Sarah Lawrence in 1981 with a bachelor of arts in liberal arts, and went on to receive a master of arts in speech and communication from Northwestern University in 1985.

Emanuel took part in a two-week civilian volunteer holiday, known as the Sar-El, where, as a civilian volunteer, he assisted the Israel Defense Forces during the 1991 Gulf War, helping to repair truck brakes in one of Israel's northern bases.

== Early career ==
Emanuel began his political career with the public interest and consumer rights organization Illinois Public Action. He went on to serve in a number of capacities in local and national politics, initially specializing in fund-raising for Illinois campaigns, and then nationally. Emanuel worked for Democrat Paul Simon's 1984 election to the U.S. Senate. He also worked as the national campaign director for the Democratic Congressional Campaign Committee in 1988, and was senior advisor and chief fund-raiser for Richard M. Daley's successful initial campaign for mayor of Chicago, in 1989. He subsequently worked for Illinois Attorney General Neil Hartigan, conducting opposition research for his 1990 gubernatorial campaign.

At the start of then-Arkansas Governor Bill Clinton's presidential primary campaign, Emanuel was appointed to direct the campaign's finance committee. Emanuel insisted that Clinton schedule time for fund-raising and delay campaigning in New Hampshire. Clinton embarked on an aggressive national fund-raising campaign that allowed the campaign to keep buying television time as attacks on Clinton's character threatened to swamp the campaign during the New Hampshire primary. Clinton's primary rival, Paul Tsongas (the New Hampshire Democratic primary winner), later withdrew, citing a lack of campaign funds. Richard Mintz, a Washington public relations consultant who worked with Emanuel on the campaign, spoke about the soundness of the idea: "It was that [extra] million dollars that really allowed the campaign to withstand the storm we had to ride out in New Hampshire [over Clinton's relationship with Gennifer Flowers and the controversy over his draft status during the Vietnam War]." Emanuel's knowledge of the top donors in the country, and his rapport with "heavily Jewish" donors helped Clinton amass a then-unheard-of sum of $72 million. While working on the Clinton campaign, Emanuel was paid a retainer by the investment bank Goldman Sachs.

=== Clinton administration ===
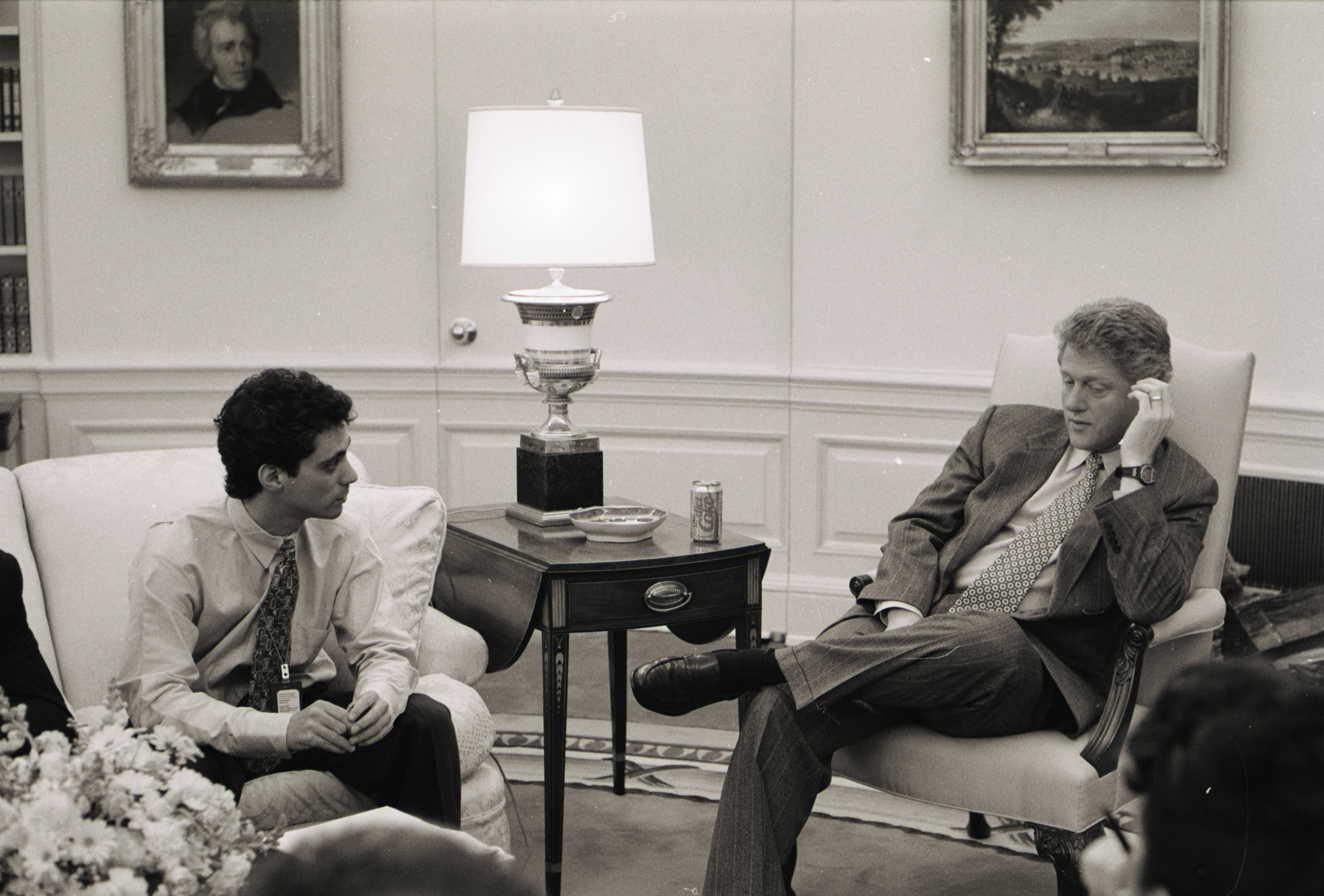
Emanuel with President Bill Clinton in 1993

Following the campaign, Emanuel served as a senior advisor to Clinton at the White House from 1993 to 1998. In the White House, Emanuel was initially assistant to the president for political affairs and then senior advisor to the president for policy and strategy. He was a leading strategist in White House efforts to institute NAFTA, increased deportations of undocumented immigrants and the 1994 Crime Bill, among other Clinton initiatives.

Emanuel is known for his "take-no-prisoners style" that has earned him the nickname "Rahmbo." Emanuel sent a dead fish in a box to a pollster who was late delivering polling results. On the night after the 1992 election, angry at Democrats and Republicans who "betrayed" them in the 1992 election, Emanuel stood up at a celebratory dinner with colleagues from the campaign and began plunging a steak knife into the table and began rattling off names while shouting "Dead! Dead! Dead!". Before Tony Blair gave a pro-Clinton speech during the impeachment crisis, Emanuel reportedly screamed at Blair "Don't fuck this up!" while Clinton was present. Blair and Clinton both burst into laughter. However, by 2007 friends of Emanuel were saying that he has "mellowed out". Stories of his personal style have entered the popular culture, inspiring articles and websites that chronicle these and other quotes and incidents. The character Josh Lyman in The West Wing was said to be based on Emanuel, though executive producer Lawrence O'Donnell denied this.

=== Finance ===
After serving as an advisor to Bill Clinton, in 1998 Emanuel resigned from his position in the administration and joined the investment banking firm Wasserstein Perella, where he worked for 2.5 years. Although he did not have an MBA or prior banking experience, he became a managing director at the firm's Chicago office in 1999, and according to congressional disclosures, made $16.2 million in his 2.5 years as a banker. At Wasserstein Perella, he worked on eight deals, including the acquisition by Commonwealth Edison of Peco Energy and the purchase by GTCR Golder Rauner of the SecurityLink home security unit from SBC Communications.

=== Freddie Mac ===
In 2000, Emanuel was named to the Board of Directors of Freddie Mac by President Clinton. He earned at least $320,000 during his time there, including later stock sales. During Emanuel's time on the board, Freddie Mac was plagued with scandals involving campaign contributions and accounting irregularities. The Bush administration rejected a request under the Freedom of Information Act to review Freddie Mac board minutes and correspondence during Emanuel's time as a director. The Office of Federal Housing Enterprise Oversight later accused the board of having "failed in its duty to follow up on matters brought to its attention". Emanuel resigned from the board in 2001 before his first bid for Congress. During this time, he served on the Board of Commissioners of the Chicago Housing Authority.

== U.S. House of Representatives ==
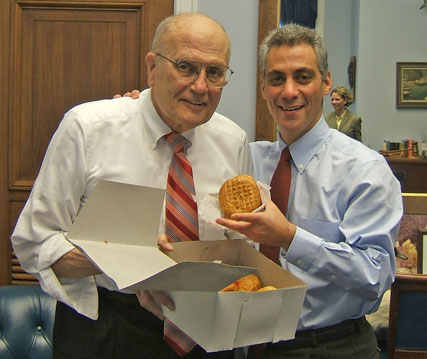
Rep. John Dingell and Rep. Emanuel celebrate Paczki Day, February 28, 2006.

=== Elections ===
In 2002, Emanuel pursued the U.S. House seat in the 5th district of Illinois, previously held by Rod Blagojevich, who successfully ran for governor of Illinois. His strongest opponent in the crowded primary of eight was former Illinois state representative Nancy Kaszak. During the primary, Edward Moskal, president of the Polish American Congress, a political action committee endorsing Kaszak, called Emanuel a "millionaire carpetbagger". Emanuel won the primary and defeated Republican candidate Mark Augusti in the general election. Emanuel's inaugural election to the House with 67% was the closest he ever had for this seat, as he subsequently won more than 70% in all of his re-election bids.

=== Tenure ===
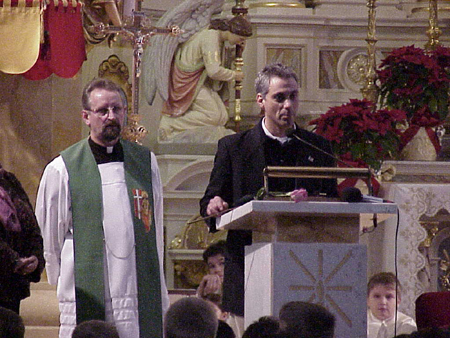
Rep. Emanuel speaking at St. Hyacinth Basilica in Chicago's Polish Village

Emanuel was elected after the October 2002 joint resolution authorizing the Iraq War, and so did not vote on it. However, in the lead up to the resolution, Emanuel spoke out in support of the war.

In January 2003, Emanuel was named to the House Financial Services Committee and sat on the subcommittee that oversaw Freddie Mac. A few months later, Freddie Mac Chief Executive Officer Leland Brendsel was forced out and the committee and subcommittee commenced more than a year of hearings into Freddie Mac. Emanuel skipped every hearing allegedly for reasons of avoiding any appearance of favoritism, impropriety, or conflict of interest.

Emanuel aligned himself with the centrist Democratic Leadership Council.

=== Democratic Congressional Campaign Committee chairman ===
Emanuel assumed the position of Democratic Congressional Campaign Committee chairman (DCCC) after the death of the previous chair, Bob Matsui. Emanuel led the Democratic Party's effort to capture the majority in the House of Representatives in the 2006 elections. The documentary HouseQuake, featuring Emanuel, chronicles those elections. Emanuel had disagreements over Democratic election strategy with Democratic National Committee Chairman Howard Dean. Dean favored a "fifty-state strategy", building support for the Democratic Party over the long term, while Emanuel advocated a more tactical approach focusing attention on key districts.

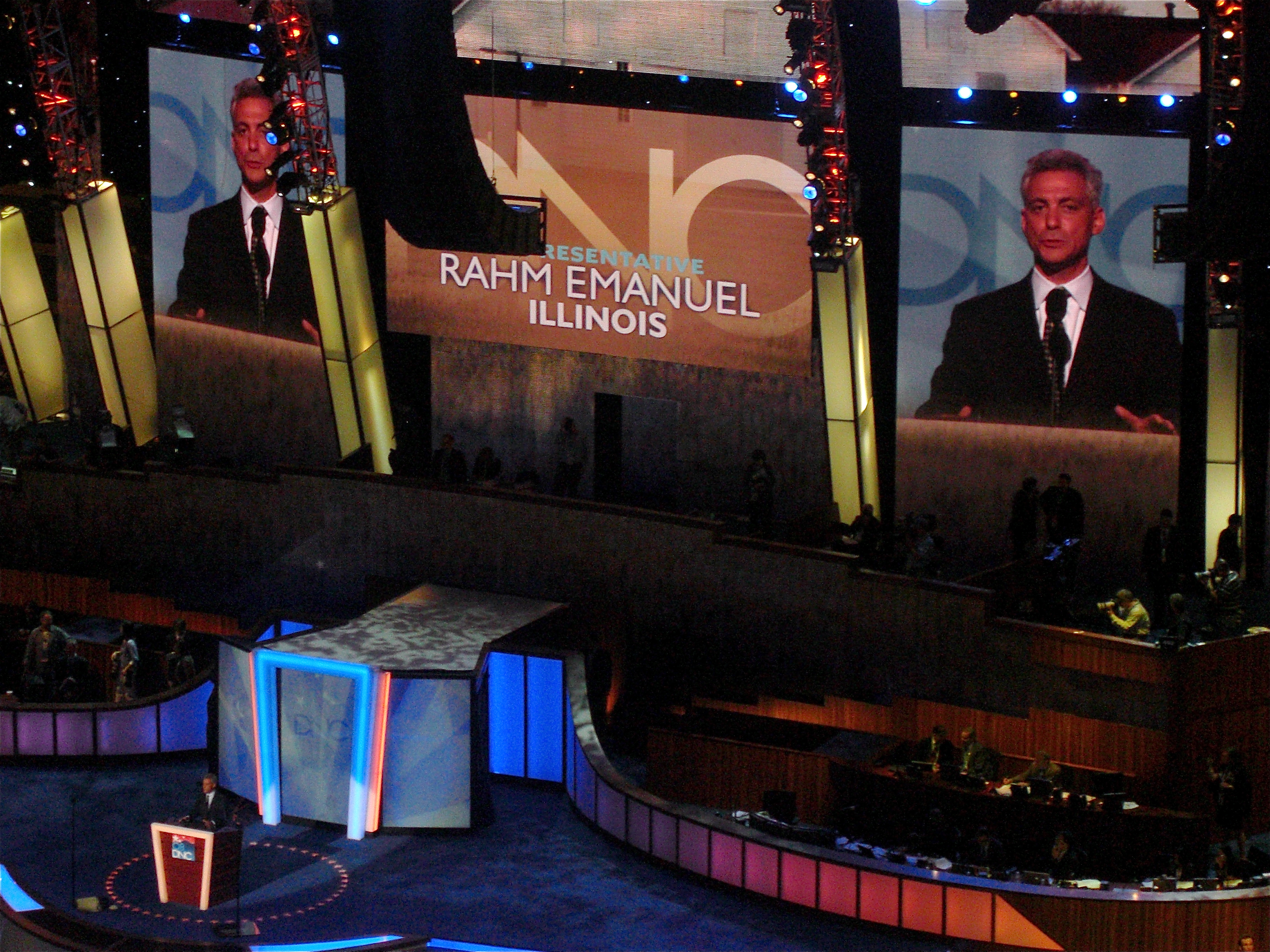
Emanuel speaks during the second day of the 2008 Democratic National Convention in Denver, Colorado.

The Democratic Party gained 30 seats in the House in the 2006 elections, and Emanuel received praise for his stewardship of the DCCC, even from Illinois Republican Rep. Ray LaHood, who said, "He legitimately can be called the golden boy of the Democratic Party today. He recruited the right candidates, found the money, and funded them, and provided issues for them. Rahm did what no one else could do in seven cycles."

However, Emanuel also faced criticism for his failure to support progressive candidates, as Howard Dean advocated. Emanuel had "aggressively recruited right-leaning candidates, frequently military veterans, including former Republicans". Many of the Representatives that Rahm had recruited, such as Heath Shuler, ended up "[voting] against important Obama administration priorities, like economic stimulus, banking reform, and health care". Progressive activist Howie Klein has said that Emanuel's congressional campaign strategy was short-sighted, as it "contributed to the massive G.O.P. majorities we have now, the biggest since the nineteen-twenties" when the Democrats lost control of the House in the 2010 mid-term elections. Progressives like Rep. Maxine Waters criticized him for recruiting conservative Blue Dog Democrats since they played a leading role in Obamacare (Affordable Care Act) negotiations, and stripping it down while voting against other liberal priorities. She characterized it as his "chickens are coming home to roost" since he had told them that they could vote the way they wanted once in office.

After Emanuel's election as chairman of the Democratic Caucus (see below), Chris Van Hollen became committee chair for the 110th Congress.

=== Democratic Caucus chairman ===
After his role in helping the Democrats win the 2006 elections, Emanuel was believed to be a leading candidate for the position of Majority Whip. Nancy Pelosi, who became the next Speaker of the House of Representatives, persuaded him not to challenge Jim Clyburn, but instead to succeed Clyburn in the role of Democratic Caucus Chairman. In return, Pelosi agreed to assign the caucus chair more responsibilities, including "aspects of strategy and messaging, incumbent retention, policy development, and rapid-response communications". Caucus vice-chair John Larson remained in his role instead of running for the chairman position. After Vice President Dick Cheney asserted that he did not fall within the bounds of orders set for the executive branch, Emanuel called for cutting off the $4.8 million the Executive Branch provides for the Vice President's office.

== White House chief of staff ==
Emanuel declared in April 2006 that he would support Hillary Clinton should she pursue the presidency in 2008. Emanuel remained close to Clinton after leaving the White House, talking strategy with her at least once a month as chairman of the DCCC. However, Emanuel's loyalties came into conflict when his home-state Senator, Barack Obama, expressed interest in the race. Asked in January 2007, about his stance on the Democratic presidential nomination, he said: "I'm hiding under the desk. I'm very far under the desk, and I'm bringing my paper and my phone." Emanuel remained neutral in the race until June 4, 2008, the day after the final primary contests, when he endorsed Obama.

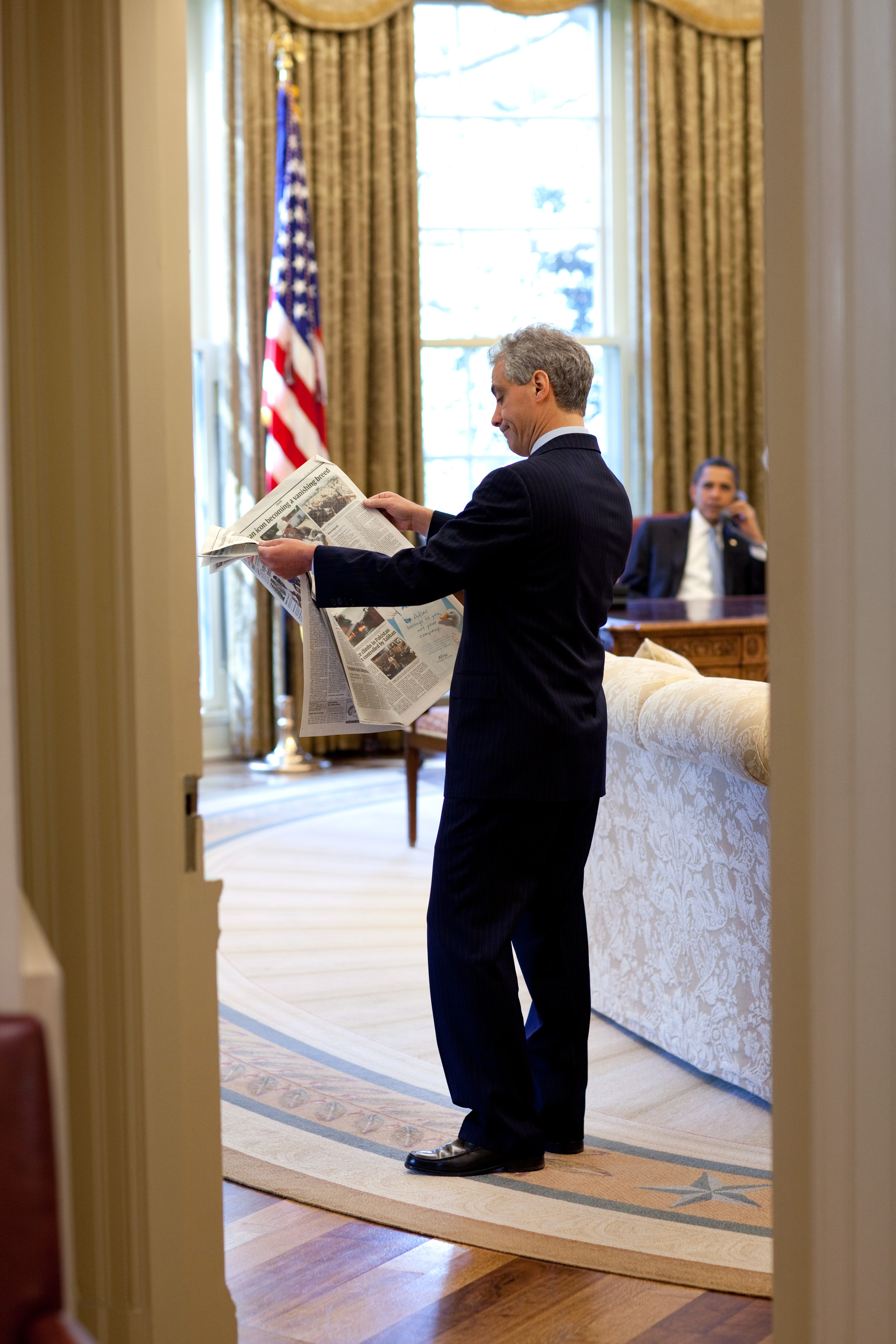
White House Chief of Staff Emanuel reads a newspaper in the Oval Office, as President Barack Obama talks on the phone on April 4, 2009.

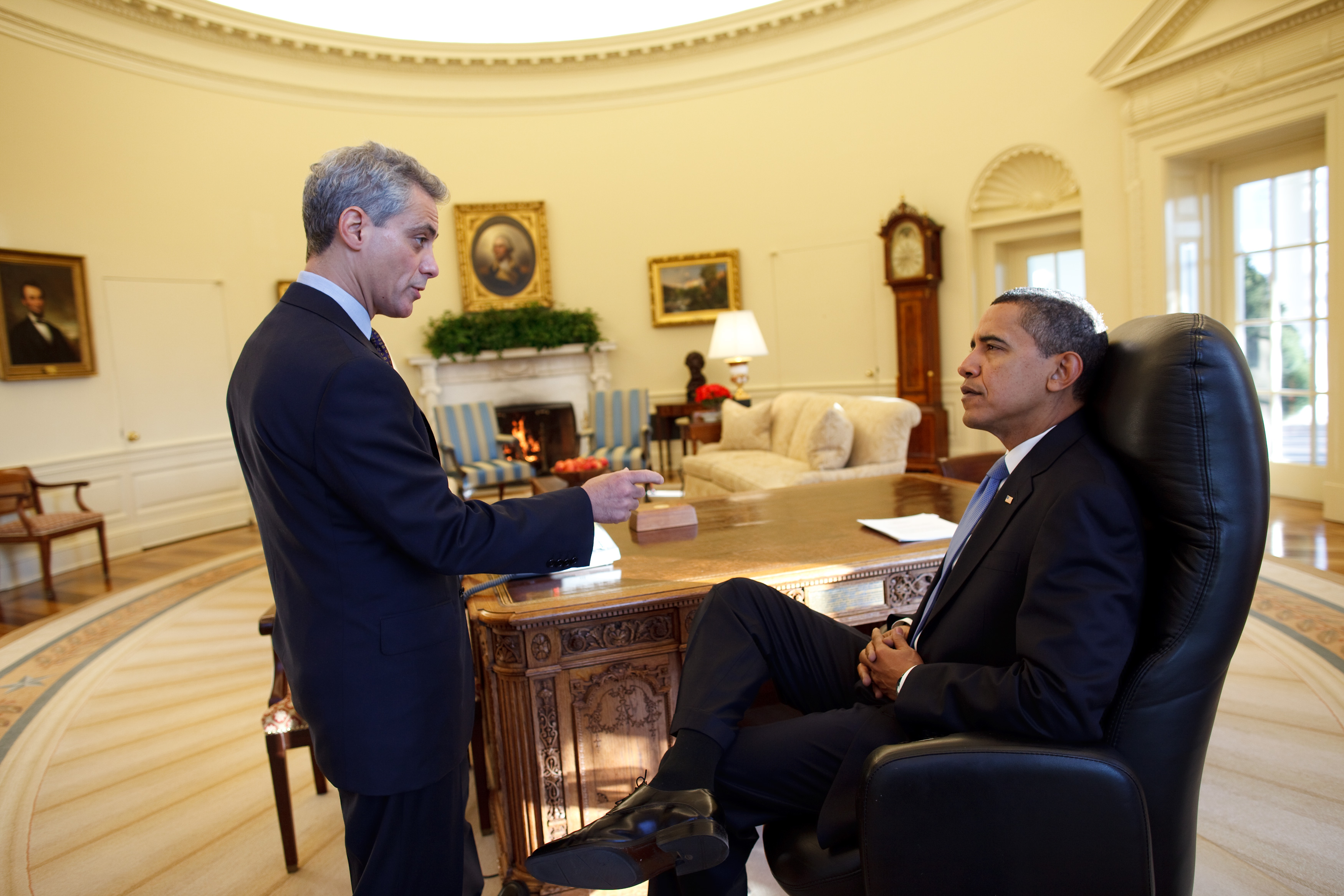
Emanuel with Barack Obama in the Oval Office

On November 6, 2008, Emanuel accepted the position of White House chief of staff for U.S. President Barack Obama. He resigned his congressional seat effective January 2, 2009. A special primary to fill his vacated congressional seat was held on March 3, 2009, and the special general election on April 7. John Fritchey, a candidate for that seat, said at a forum that Emanuel had told him he may be interested in running for the seat again in the future.

Some Republican leaders criticized Emanuel's appointment because they believed it went against Obama's campaign promises of less divisive politics, given Emanuel's reputation as a partisan Democrat. Republican Senator Lindsey Graham disagreed, saying: "This is a wise choice by President-elect Obama. He's tough, but fair, honest, direct, and candid." Ira Forman, executive director of the National Jewish Democratic Council, said that the choice indicated that Obama would not listen to the "wrong people" regarding the U.S.–Israel relationship. Some commentators opined that Emanuel would be good for the Israeli–Palestinian peace process because if Israeli leaders made excuses for not dismantling settlements, Emanuel would be tough and pressure the Israelis to comply. Some Palestinians expressed dismay at Emanuel's appointment. In an interview with an Israeli newspaper, his father, Dr. Benjamin Emanuel said of his appointment, "Obviously he'll influence the President to be pro-Israel. Why wouldn't he? What is he, an Arab? He's not going to be mopping floors at the White House." Emanuel nicknamed his White House colleague Ben Rhodes "Hamas" for advocating Palestinian human rights during internal policy debates, having once remarked, "Hamas over here, is going to make it impossible for my kid to have his fucking bar mitzvah in Israel."

Weeks after accepting the appointment, Emanuel participated on a panel of corporate chief executive officers sponsored by the Wall Street Journal, and said, "You never want a serious crisis to go to waste." Emanuel explained later, "... what I said was, never allow a good crisis to go to waste when it's an opportunity to do things that you had never considered, or that you didn't think were possible." In a 2009 article in The New York Times, Emanuel was characterized as being "perhaps the most influential chief of staff of a generation".

Emanuel has a reputation for his no-holds-barred negotiation style that involves "his share of shouting and cursing". Ezekiel Emanuel has written, "The impatient, pushy Emanuel style is so well known that during a recent job interview I was asked, point-blank, whether I had the level-headed temperament the position required. ... . [A]s obvious as our flaws are to others, it's difficult to recognize them in ourselves." At a January 2010 closed-door meeting in the White House with liberal activists, Emanuel called them "fucking retarded" for planning to run TV ads attacking conservative Democrats who didn't support Obama's health-care overhaul. After the remarks were quoted in a front-page story of the Wall Street Journal, and after he was criticized by Sarah Palin, Emanuel apologized to organizations for mentally disabled people for using the word "retarded".

According to Jonathan Alter's book, The Promise, Emanuel opposed Barack Obama's plan for a broad health care reform, but Obama overrode him. Emanuel advocated a smaller plan because it could get bi-partisan support. Emanuel wanted to expand coverage for children, and increase the number of single mothers eligible for Medicaid. For that reason, it was dubbed "the Titanic plan", a reference to the priority given to saving women and children during the sinking of the Titanic. Reportedly, House Speaker Pelosi had to convince Obama on the health care initiative after Emanuel dramatically scaled it back. Emanuel has since apologized for his role, saying, "Thank God for the country, he didn't listen to me", after the Supreme Court upheld "ObamaCare" in 2012.

As chief of staff, Emanuel would make his staff laugh. During a staff meeting, when Chief Technology Officer Aneesh Chopra gave uniformly upbeat reports, Emanuel is said to have looked at him and said: "Whatever you're taking, I want some." For a time, his desk had a nameplate reading "Undersecretary for Go Fuck Yourself", though it was removed after Michelle Obama expressed her dislike of it. Emanuel had a hand in warstrategy, political maneuvering, communications and economic policy. Bob Woodward wrote in Obama's Wars that Emanuel made a habit of telephoning CIA Director Leon Panetta and asking about the lethal drone strikes aimed at Al Qaeda, asking, "Who did we get today?".

In 2010, Emanuel was reported to have conflicts with other senior members of the president's team and ideological clashes over policy. He was also the focal point of criticism from left-leaning Democrats for the administration's perceived move to the center. By September 2010, the Democrats anticipated heavy losses in the mid-term elections; this expectation was said to precipitate Emanuel's departure as chief of staff.

== Mayor of Chicago ==
=== Elections ===
==== 2011 ====
On September 30, 2010, it was announced that Emanuel would leave his post as White House chief of staff to run for mayor of Chicago. He was replaced by Pete Rouse on October 2, 2010. Emanuel entered the race with high name recognition, having not only a sizable local profile, but also a sizable national profile.

Emanuel's eligibility for office was challenged on the basis of an alleged lack of residency in Chicago for one year prior to the election. This was the period when Emanuel was in Washington serving as the White House chief of staff. The Board of Elections and the Cook County Circuit Court affirmed his eligibility. A divided Court of Appeals reversed the Circuit Court, holding on January 24, 2011, that residency for purposes of a candidate is different from residency for purposes of being a voter. A further appeal to the Illinois Supreme Court resulted in a unanimous decision reversing the Court of Appeals and affirming Emanuel's eligibility.

In the race, Emanuel had a financial advantage over the other candidates. He was by far the best-financed candidate, with more than three times the campaign funds as the second-best financed candidate (Gery Chico), and more than twenty-times the third-best financed candidate (Carol Moseley Braun). Emanuel's had his financial advantage from the very start of his candidacy, as he began his campaign with approximately $1.2 million from his congressional campaign fund. By December 31, 2010, he had raised more than $10.5 million in additional funds. On January 1, 2011, the Illinois Campaign Disclosure Act took effect, limiting individual personal contributions to candidates to $5,000. Nevertheless, he continued to raise substantial funds, ultimately having procured a total $15 million over the course of his campaign (including those funds transferred from his congressional campaign committee). Emanuel was able to raise so much because he had experience fundraising, had built a Washington connections and a national profile, and his brother Ari had Hollywood connections. He had 75 contributors give more than $50,000, twenty-five of which were from out of state. Among these high-dollar contributors were Steven Spielberg, Donald Trump, and Steve Jobs. Despite having a national fundraising operation, three-quarters of his donations came locally. More than $800,000 of his contributions were from financial exchange and trading executives, with his largest single donation being a $200,000 donation from executives of the Chicago Mercantile Exchange.

Emanuel proposed lowering the city's sales tax and raising the service tax. Emanuel supported negotiating with the Chicago Teachers Union for longer school days and school years. Emanuel opposed instituting an elected school board. This received criticism from other candidates. Other candidates assailed his tenure at Freddie Mac. As the frontrunner, Emanuel had gotten more press coverage than other mayoral candidates. This was furthered by the fact that the challenge to his residency became a dominant headline. Emanuel entered the race with solid backing from North and Northwest Side Democratic Ward Committeemen.

Emanuel's advertisements portrayed him as having strong roots in the city and emphasized his upbringing on the North Shore. Contrarily, Emanuel's opponents attempted to characterize him as a carpetbagger, hailing not from the city itself but rather from the North Shore and Washington, D.C. Emanuel's advertisements also sought to emphasize his tenures in working in the White House and his tenure as a congressman. Emanuel would highlight his relations with presidents Clinton and Obama. He also sought to highlight the fact that he had forged connections in Washington during his time in congress, and also had strong business ties.

Emanuel had overwhelming support from Jewish and LGBT voters. Emanuel held a lead with independent progressives, including strong support from the lakefront liberals voting bloc of wealthy white progressives from the city's northern lakefront. As the only white candidate in the race, Emanuel was seen as likely to receive unified support from a majority of the white electorate. Since the Hispanic vote was largely split between two Hispanic candidates (Gery Chico and Miguel del Valle), once Emanuel was able to secure the support of the majority of the black vote, he had secured himself victory.

In attracting African American voters to his candidacy, Emanuel was helped by his associations with Presidents Clinton and Obama, both of whom were extremely popular among the African American community. After Moseley Braun's support began to crater following a character attack on fellow candidate Patricia Van Pelt Watkins which backfired, Emanuel was the beneficiary as the, largely African American, voters that abandoned their support of Moseley Braun's candidacy primarily migrated to support his candidacy. Once this happened, Emanuel had all but secured himself a first-place finish, and the remaining candidates were left to jockey for second-place in hopes of there being a runoff.

Emanuel carried the endorsements of both the city's major daily newspapers, the Chicago Tribune and the Chicago Sun-Times. Emanuel's mayoral campaign was the inspiration for a satirical Twitter account called Mayor Emanuel, which received more than 43,000 followers, more popular than Emanuel's actual Twitter account. Emanuel announced on February 28 that if the author would reveal himself, he would donate $5,000 to the charity of the author's choice. When Chicago journalist Dan Sinker revealed himself, Emanuel donated the money to Young Chicago Authors, a community organization which helps young people with writing and publishing skills.

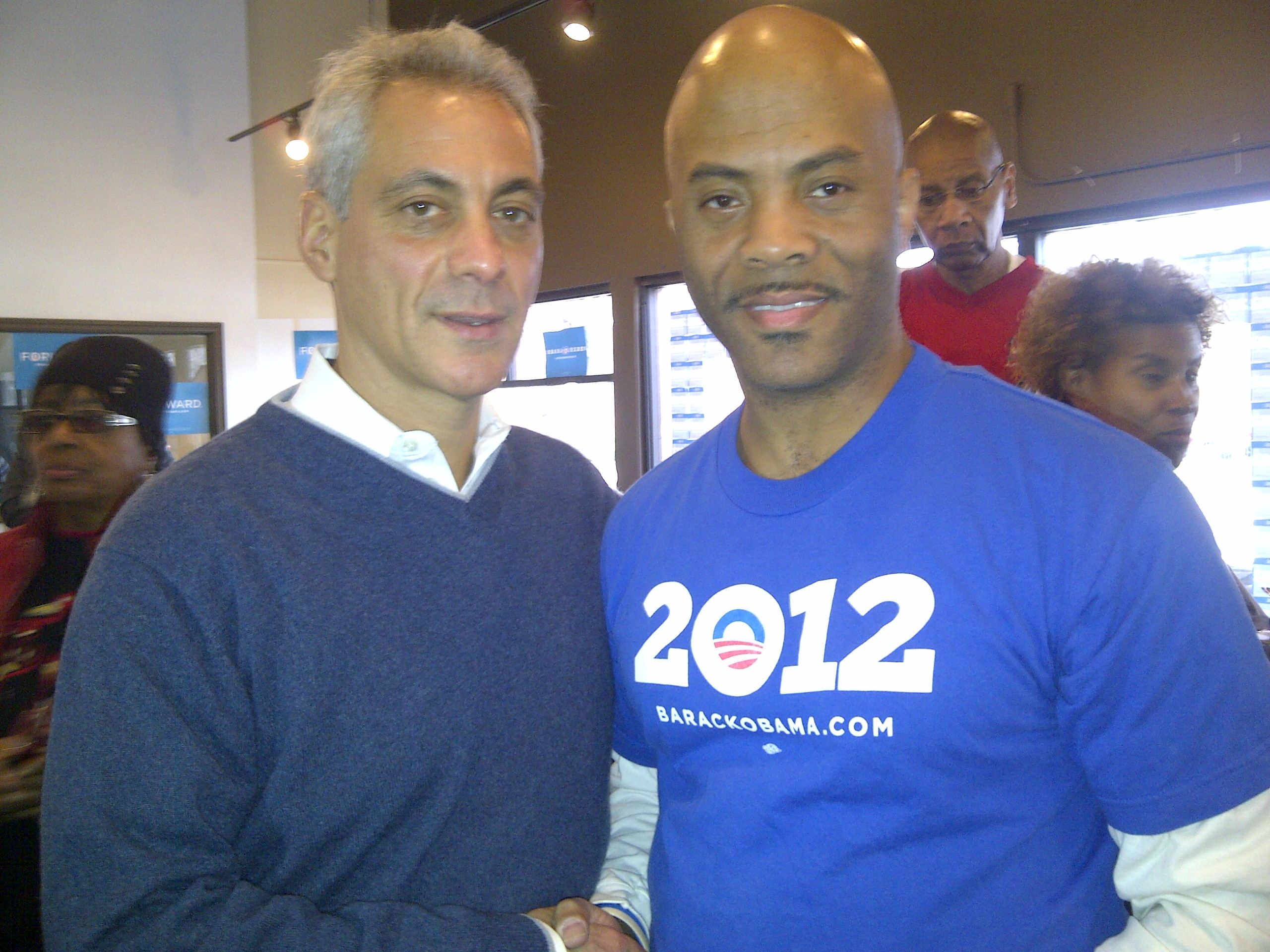
Emanuel (left) at the 2012 Hyde Park Obama presidential reelection campaign office

Emanuel was elected on February 22, 2011, with 55% of the vote, and was sworn in as the 55th Mayor of Chicago on May 16, 2011, at the Pritzker Pavilion, becoming Chicago's first Jewish mayor. At his inauguration were outgoing Mayor Richard M. Daley, Vice President Joe Biden, Labor Secretary Hilda Solis, Treasury Secretary Timothy Geithner, former Mayor Jane Byrne, and William M. Daley, brother of the outgoing mayor and who would later serve as White House Chief of Staff.

==== 2015 ====
In August 2014, Chicago Tribune poll reported Emanuel had a 35% approval rating as mayor of Chicago. In 2015, Emanuel ran a similar style campaign as 2011, during commute hours he was often seen at the city's train stations shaking hands and greeting commuters. He ultimately won 56 percent of the vote in the run-off election against Jesús "Chuy" García held on April 7, 2015. He had been hurt by sharp neighborhood criticism of his decision to shut down 50 public schools in black and Latino neighborhoods, and his installation of red light cameras, together with anger at the high level of gun violence on the streets. On the other hand, he was supported by the business community and most elements of the Democratic party.

==== 2019 ====
Emanuel announced in October 2017 that he was running for reelection in 2019, despite low approval ratings and some potentially serious challengers. In September 2018, Emanuel decided to not run for reelection. Close friend David Axelrod told USA Today that Emanuel had grown uncertain about his devotion to a third term. Emanuel had been leading in the polls prior to his decision to withdraw. However according to Politico citing data from Public Policy Polling, Rahm Emanuel had a lead over most of his potential challengers but it was "not enough to win the contest outright" and that in a head-to-head matchup with Paul Vallas, Vallas actually had a polling lead over Emanuel with 39 percent to 33. In an interview with the Chicago Tribune, Emanuel stated that he had been conferring with his wife and children for months before announcing the decision and that he felt it was time to "write the next chapter."

=== Tenure ===
Emanuel assembled a transition team from varied backgrounds. On November 16, the city council voted unanimously to adopt the mayor's first budget, which decreased the budget by $34 million and increased spending by $46.2 million, supported by increasing fees and fines. Despite most Aldermen opposing cuts to library workers and the closure of mental health clinics, they ultimately supported it, calling it "honest". At a news conference in November 2012, Emanuel listed his top three priorities for the state legislature as security and pension reform, adding a casino to Chicago, and equal marriage rights for same-sex couples. At a press conference with then Illinois Governor Pat Quinn, who previously vetoed legislation to put a casino in Chicago, the two were "very close" to reaching a deal. In April 2018, Emanuel received an honorary Doctor of Laws degree from NUI Galway, a university in Chicago's sister city of Galway, Ireland, with the conferrers citing achievements in education reform while Mayor.

Rahm Emanuel speaking at the ground-breaking ceremony of the Bloomingdale Trail in August 2013

==== Aldermanic appointments ====
As mayor, Emanuel appointed several individuals to fill vacancies on the Chicago City Council. This included appointing Natashia Holmes as 7th Ward alderman in 2013, Deb Mell as 33rd Ward alderman in 2013, Sophia King as 4th ward alderman in 2016, and Silvana Tabares as 23rd Ward alderman in 2018. Following the resignation of Willie Cochran in March 2019, Emanuel had the opportunity to make a final aldermanic appointment, appointing an interim alderman to hold the seat until his successor (to be elected in an April 2 runoff) would assume office on May 20. However, Emanuel did not make such an appointment, leaving the seat vacant until March 20.

==== Police and community relations ====
In August 2012, a federal lawsuit was filed by eleven Chicago police officers alleging they were removed from the mayoral security detail and replaced with officers who worked on Emanuel's mayoral campaign, in violation of the 1983 Shakman Decree, which bars city officials from making political considerations in the hiring process.

Emanuel faced a great deal of criticism for his handling of the October 20, 2014 police murder of Laquan McDonald. The dash-cam video of the shooting was initially withheld, and only was released after a judge ordered it on November 24, 2015. After the video release, Emanuel was condemned for covering up the incident and allowing Chicago police to use excessive force against minorities. Chicago Tribune columnist John Kass wrote that the Emanuel administration withheld from the public the police dashboard camera video of the shooting in order to secure the reelection. Emanuel responded to criticism of the shooting and how it was handled by firing police Superintendent Garry McCarthy. In early December, the federal Justice Department announced an investigation into the Chicago Police Department, a move which Emanuel initially called "misguided". Illinois state legislator La Shawn Ford also introduced a bill to recall the mayor (an effort most pundits claim was more symbolic than practical).

Protests erupted soon after the release of the video. On Black Friday, protesters shut down part of the city's Magnificent Mile. Public calls for resignation grew steadily over this period, including a well-circulated op-ed published in The New York Times. By early December, Emanuel's approval rating had sunk to 18%, with 67% of Chicagoans disapproving of his job performance and slightly more than half of those polled calling for his resignation. During the week of December 10, protestors blocked streets and continued to call for Emanuel to resign. Additional protests against Emanuel and Chicago's Police Department were held on the city's busy Michigan Avenue shopping area on December 24, 2015.

On December 26, 2015, a police officer killed two people in another shooting, including a woman whom the officer had shot by mistake. On December 28, Emanuel announced that he was cutting short his vacation in Cuba to deal with the crisis. Emanuel announced several changes to the Chicago police department on December 30, including doubling the number of Tasers issued to officers. On New Year's Eve, the Emanuel administration released e-mails revealing they had sought to coordinate with independent agencies such as the Independent Police Review Authority regarding public relations after the shooting. The same day The New Yorker added to the wave of negative media attention surrounding the mayor by publishing "The Sudden But Well-Deserved Fall of Rahm Emanuel," an article critically reevaluating Emanuel's legacy as a political operative since the early 1990s.

In February 2016, Chicago Tribune polls reported that Emanuel's approval rating was 27%. The Chicago Tribune stated that this all-time record low job approval confirms a "public crisis in confidence" for Emanuel who had been subjected to weeks of public protests, allegations of him covering up the Laquan McDonald police shooting video, as well as federal civil rights investigation of his police department. For several months, Emanuel claimed that making the video public would jeopardize a federal investigation into the shooting and had refused to allow the video to be shown to the public, even though the Justice Department had not raised any issues with the public release of the footage. It wasn't until a judge forced its release that it was later seen that the contents in the video contradicted the police's narrative of what had occurred. Public backlash resulted from Emanuel's handling of the video, with a "steady barrage" of "Resign Rahm" protests since November".

According to Chicago Tribune polls, the majority of voters did not believe Emanuel to be honest nor trustworthy. 83 percent of polled Chicagoans did not believe Emanuel's statements about the video, and 68 percent felt that he was not justified in withholding the video from the public. In response to the public backlash, Emanuel forced the resignation of Chicago's police chief, Garry McCarthy, as well as generating a plan that promised to reform the city's police department.

==== Public education ====
In 2012, during the contract negotiations between the city and the Chicago Teachers Union (CTU), compromise could not be reached over issues like health insurance increases, teacher evaluations, and seniority pay increases. On August 8, 2012, the CTU voted 90% to authorize a strike. On September 10, the CTU began a strike after CTU President Lewis declared that negotiations with the city were not succeeding. On September 14, the CTU reached a tentative agreement with the city which included preferences for teachers who have been laid off due to a school closing to be hired in another school and student test scores having less of a role in teacher evaluations than the city had originally planned. This tentative agreement did not hold, and the strike continued, after which Emanuel announced his intention to seek a legal injunction, forcing teachers back to work. On September 17, Emanuel's efforts to end the strike stalled as the walkout went into the second week. Delegates from the CTU voted to end the strike on September 18, 2012, and students began their return to the schools the following day.

On September 17, 2013, Emanuel's appointed Chicago Board of Education announced the closing of 50 Chicago public schools, 49 elementary schools and a high school — the largest school closure in Chicago history. The trends in dropout and graduation rates have shown considerable improvement in the five years following, but researchers point out the alternative school performance does not follow the general trend.

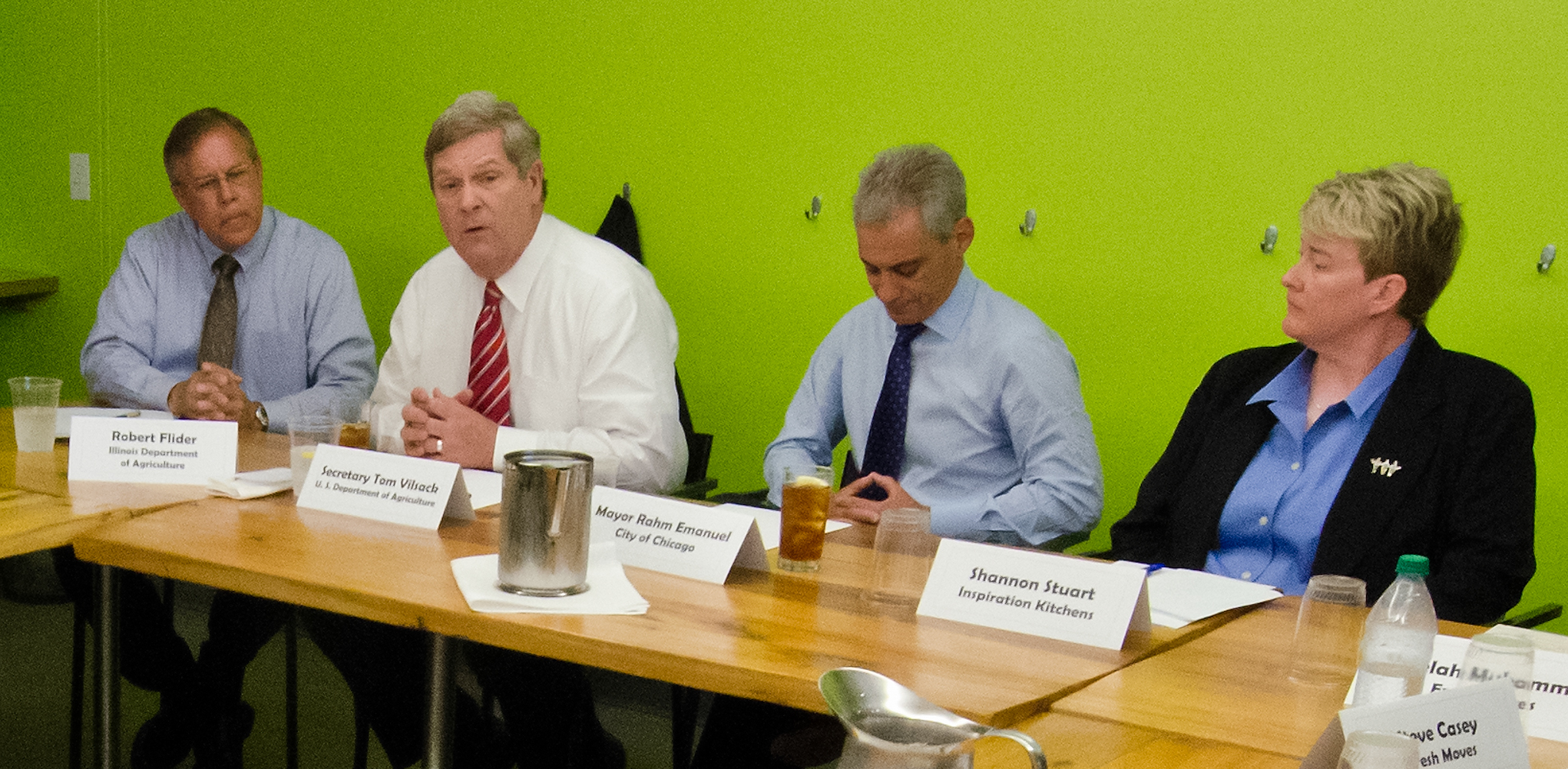
Emanuel at a Chicago round table with United States Secretary of Agriculture Tom Vilsack and Director of the Illinois Department of Agriculture Robert Flider on June 8, 2012

==== Public health ====
On August 16, 2011, Emanuel unveiled "Healthy Chicago", the city's first public health blueprint with Chicago Department of Public Health Commissioner Bechara Choucair. Emanuel initiated the consolidation of City Council committees from 19 to 16 in a cost control effort. On October 30, 2012, Emanuel voiced his support for the demolition of the abandoned Prentice Women's Hospital Building, in order for Northwestern University, which owns the property, to build a new facility. Preservationists supported historical landmark status. Days later, the Commission on Chicago Landmarks voted that the building met landmark status criteria then reversed their decision later in the same meeting. On November 15, a judge granted a temporary stay of the decision in order for a lawsuit filed by preservation coalitions against the landmark commission to be heard.

==== Lack of transparency ====
During Emanuel's time as mayor of Chicago, two of Emanuel's appointees, Barbara Byrd-Bennett and Amer Ahmad, were convicted of corruption charges. A third appointee, Forrest Claypool, resigned after the inspector general accused him of a cover up. Emanuel received backlash for defending him against the accusations.

Emanuel rejected requests under the Illinois Freedom of Information Act from the Chicago Tribune for various communication and information logs for himself and his staff as "unduly burdensome". After a second request by the Chicago Tribune, they were informed that 90 percent of the emails had been deleted by Emanuel and his top aides. As a result, Emanuel came under fire for going against his campaign promise to create "the most open, accountable, and transparent government that the City of Chicago has ever seen".

Emanuel and his office were found guilty of breaking state law by withholding government emails by transferring them onto his personal phone. In March 2017, the Chicago Tribune reported Emanuel released 2,696 emails he had previously withheld. In the emails there were found to be 26 possible violations of lobbying laws. On at least 26 occasions lobbyists, corporate executives, donors, and friends of Emanuel got access to Emanuel or other city officials without registering as a lobbyist or reporting their contact to the ethics board.

Emanuel announced preliminary plans to award Elon Musk a contract to build a Hyperloop between downtown Chicago and the city's O'Hare International Airport, although it would receive no public subsidies under this plan. However, some criticized the fact that Elon Musk has in the past donated more than $55,000 to Emanuel's various election campaigns, suggesting a potential conflict of interest between the two.

==== Tax-exempt status of Lollapalooza ====
Lollapalooza, a local summer music festival in Grant Park, was exempt from taxation. Emanuel's brother Ari is the co-CEO of William Morris Endeavor, which co-owns the event. In 2011 Rahm Emanuel asked the City Council to appoint an independent third party negotiator, to avoid having the negotiation seen as biased. Although the deal was reached before Emanuel took office, tax breaks must be negotiated every year. It was later revealed that the festival received its tax exemption for 2011 in the final days of the Daley administration. In 2012, Lollapalooza paid taxes for the first time in seven years and extended its contract to host in Grant Park through 2021.

==== Immigration ====
Chicago became a de jure sanctuary city in 2012 when Emanuel and the City Council passed the Welcoming City Ordinance.

=== Approval ratings ===
Pollster	Date	Approve	Disapprove	Unsure	Margin of error	Sample size	Polling segment	Polling method	Source
Crain's Chicago Business / Ipsos	September 2012	37%	36%	27%	± 4.7%	Less than 600	Chicago adults	Online	
Crain's Chicago Business / Ipsos	February 2013	19%	35%	45% (Note: Includes 30% of respondents who said they had "mixed feelings.")	± 4.7%	Less than 600	Chicago adults	Online	
Chicago Tribune / WGN-TV	April 30–April 6, 2013	50%	40%	–	± 3.2%	800	Chicago voters	Telephone	
APC Research / Chicago Tribune	August 6–12, 2014	35%	–	–	± 3.5%	800	Chicago registered voters	Telephone	
Illinois Observer	December 2015	18%	67%	–	–	739	Chicago likely voters	–	
Research America Inc. / Chicago Tribune	January 20–28, 2016	27%	63%	–	±3.2%	985	Chicago registered voters	Telephone	
Kaiser Family Foundation / New York Times	April 21–May 3, 2016	25%	62%	12%	± 4%	1123	Chicago adults	Telephone	

=== End of tenure ===
Emanuel planned to arrange for a smooth transition between his mayoral administration and that of his elected successor Lori Lightfoot. Reports were that he intended to model the transition between their administrations upon the U.S. presidential transition between the George W. Bush and Barack Obama administrations. Emanuel had been part of that transition as Obama's Chief of Staff designate.

== Post-mayoral career ==
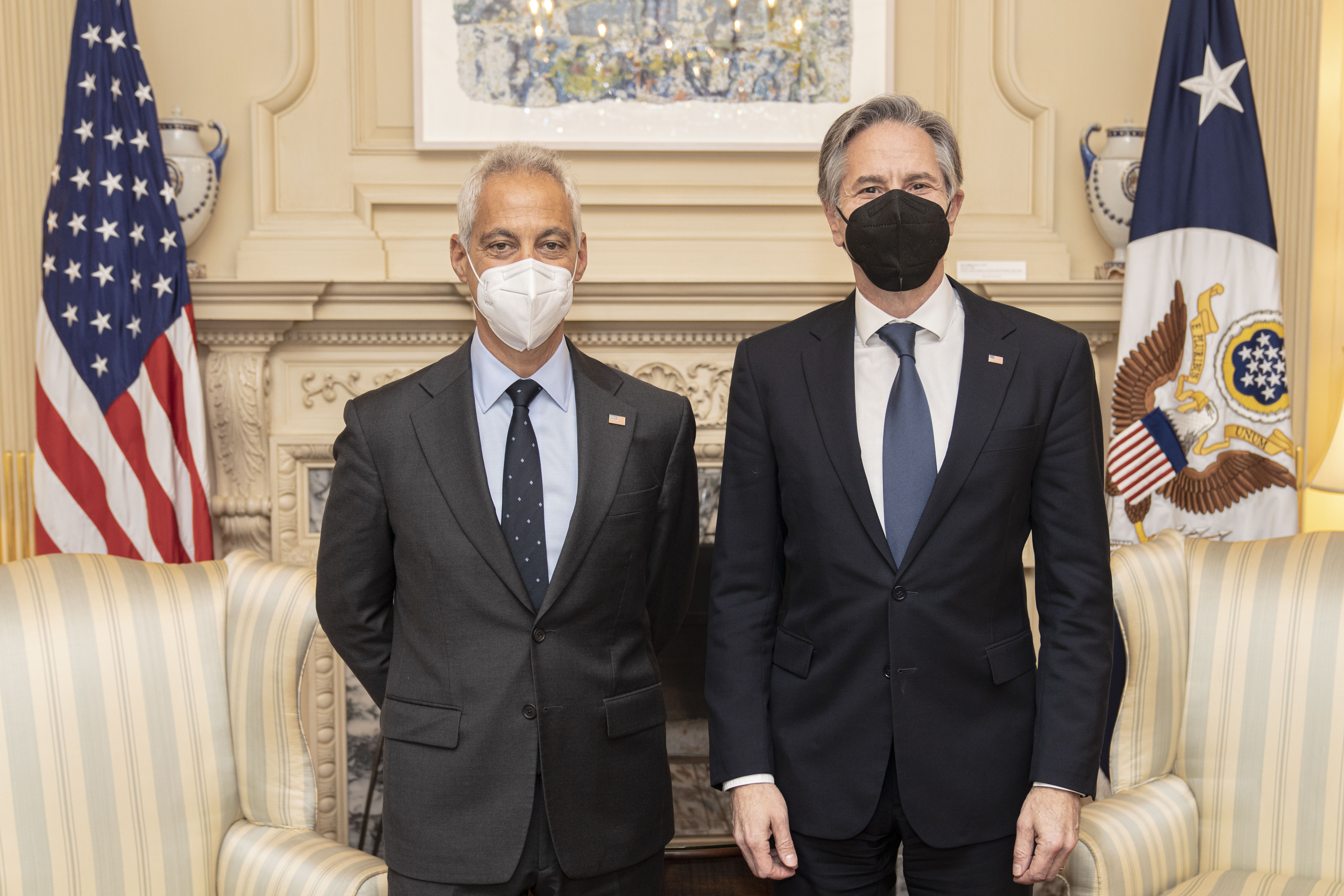
Emanuel (left) with US Secretary of State Antony Blinken in 2022

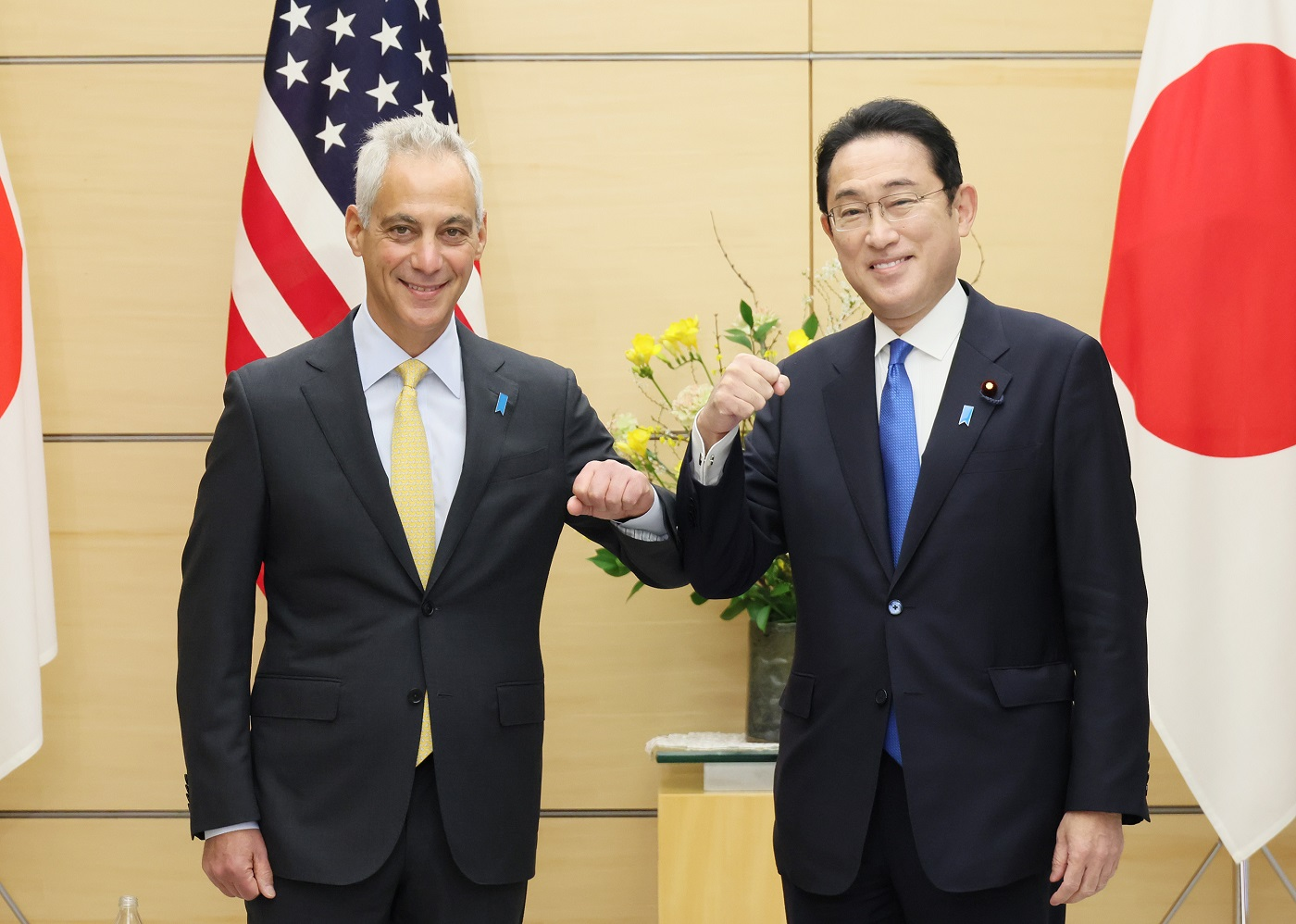
Emanuel with Japan's Prime Minister Fumio Kishida in 2022

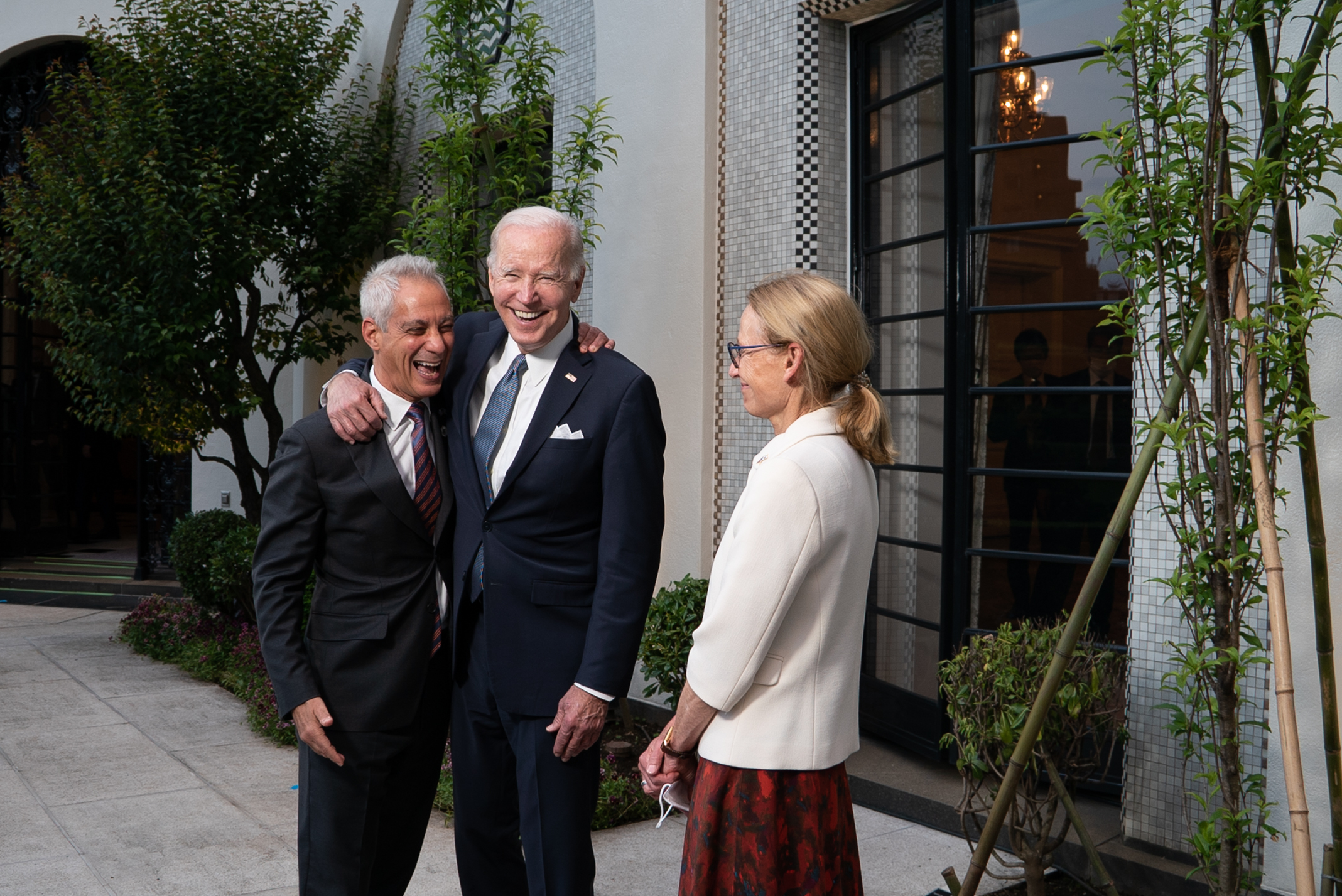
Emanuel and his wife with President Joe Biden in May 2022

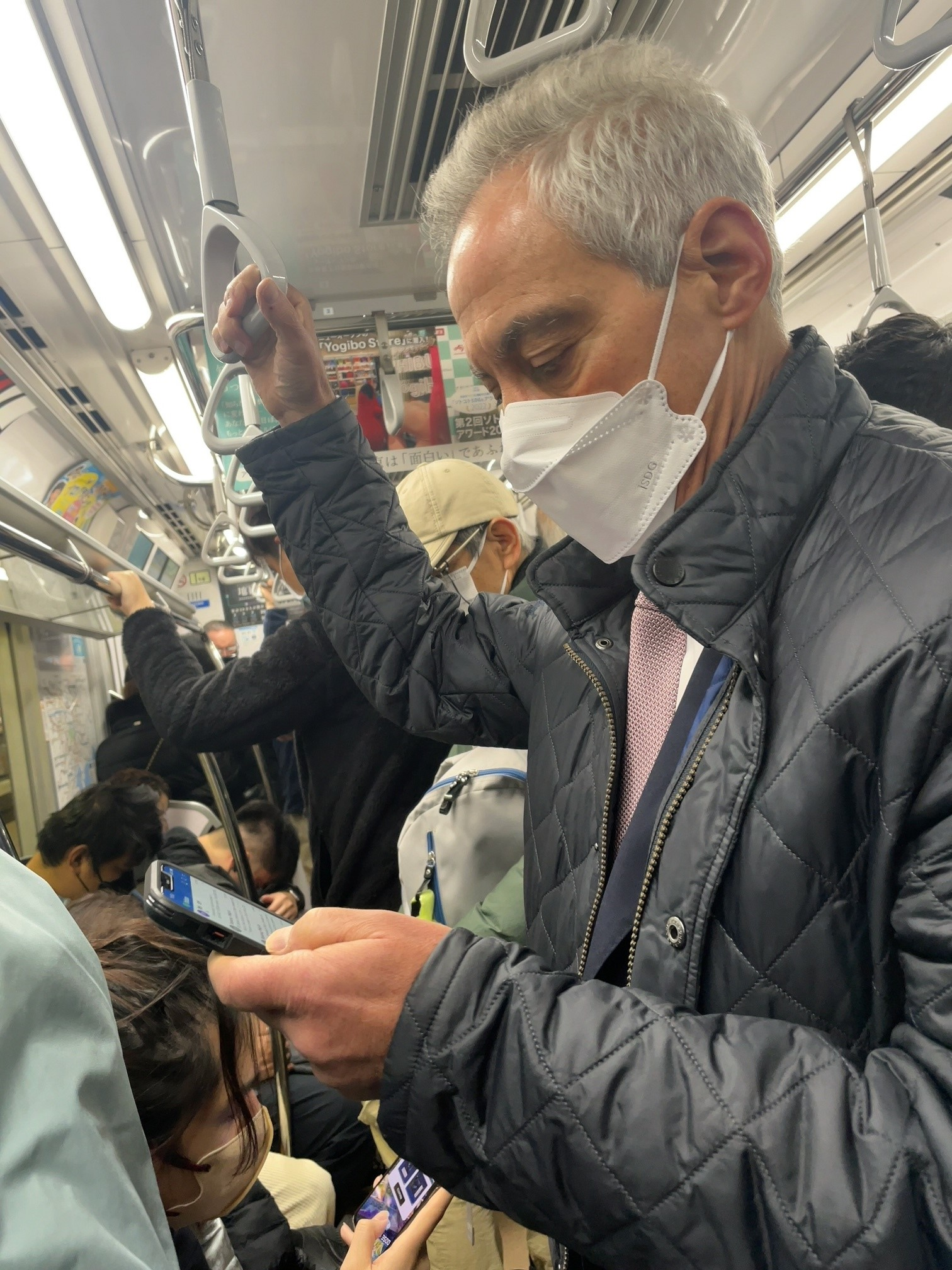
Emanuel riding a Tokyo Metro train in January 2023

Hours after Emanuel left office, the magazine The Atlantic, where he had written a dozen essays in prior months, made him a contributing editor; however, this honorary title was withdrawn after black staff members objected. In May 2019, he was named founding executive chair of the National BAM Advisory Council of the Becoming A Man youth program. In June 2019, Emanuel joined Centerview Partners as a senior counselor. Since July 2019, Emanuel has also served as a political analyst for ABC News.

Progressive politicians nationally, including Alexandria Ocasio-Cortez and Matt Martin, opposed his potential inclusion in Joe Biden's Cabinet, citing his handling of the murder of Laquan McDonald. Initially, Emanuel was considered for transportation secretary in the Biden administration.

=== United States ambassador to Japan ===
It was reported in February 2021 that Emanuel was being considered by the Biden administration as an ambassador to either China or Japan. In April 2021 it was reported that Biden had chosen him as ambassador to Japan; Emanuel was formally nominated to serve as ambassador in August 2021. Hearings were held on Emanuel's nomination in the Senate Foreign Relations Committee on October 20, 2021. The committee favorably reported Emanuel's nomination to the Senate floor on November 3, 2021. On December 18, 2021, the United States Senate confirmed Emanuel's nomination in a 48–21 vote; senators Ed Markey, Jeff Merkley and Elizabeth Warren were the only Democrats to vote against his confirmation. He presented his credentials to Japanese Emperor Naruhito on March 25, 2022.

Emanuel gained popularity with the Japanese public, in part by using the local rail transport system to get around Tokyo and across the country, frequently posting photographs of himself using the rail systems on Twitter. However, he drew criticism from some Japanese politicians with his public statements on gay and transgender rights, released while Japanese lawmakers debated an anti-discrimination bill. Masamune Wada, a Liberal Democratic member of the House of Councillors responded, saying Emanuel should keep out of domestic politics or risk expulsion.

In 2024, he became the first U.S. ambassador to visit Yonaguni. On August 7, 2024, it was announced that he would skip attending a memorial ceremony to the atomic bombing of Nagasaki because Israel was not invited to the ceremony.

=== Post-ambassadorship ===
Following his resignation as ambassador, Emanuel joined the New York-based investment banking firm Centerview Partners.

He also joined CNN as a commentator and began writing a column for The Washington Post, as well as appearing on many political podcasts and the lecture circuit, leading many observers to believe that he is planning to run for president in 2028.

== Political positions ==
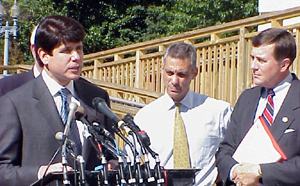
Emanuel joins Illinois governor Rod Blagojevich to advocate changes to Medicare legislation, September 24, 2003

=== Social issues ===
Emanuel was described as generally liberal on social issues in 2008. He has maintained a 100-percent pro-choice voting record and is a strong supporter of gun control, rated "F" by the NRA in December 2003. He strongly supported the banning of numerous rifles based upon "sporting purposes" criteria in 1998.

During Emanuel's mayoral tenure and congressional term, he was supportive of LGBTQ rights. As mayor, he introduced an ordinance that prohibited public places from denying restroom access based on a person's gender identity, which was passed by the city council, as well as taking steps to remove the exclusion of gender reassignment services from city health care benefits, saying, "With this change, Chicago will ensure that transgender city employees are able to receive the medical care that they need." While serving in Congress, he was supportive of gay marriage, and he received an endorsement from the Human Rights Campaign, which gave him a score of 100 percent on issues of LGBTQ equality. Since the 2024 presidential election, Emanuel has expressed support for the incarceration of transgender women in men's prisons and said that he does not believe a man could become a woman. He argued in another interview that Democrats lost the election in part because they became distracted by issues like defunding the police, climate change and transgender issues.

=== Healthcare ===
During his original 2002 campaign, Emanuel spoke in support of the goal of "to help make health care affordable and available for all Americans". Emanuel promoted the Obama administration's push for health care reform in 2010 publicly but he privately urged President Obama to narrow his goals. Concerned by Bill Clinton's failed attempt at health care reform, he advised Obama early on to pursue a smaller, incremental approach. He pushed for what he believed could be achieved in the short term and making gradual progress instead of aiming for a comprehensive plan. Obama rejected this approach and moved forward with the Affordable Care Act. When the legislative process stalled in the summer, Emanuel returned to his original position of "playing it safe," repeatedly raising it with the president during the first week of August, advocating for a scaled-down plan focused on expanding coverage for lower-income families and children, and targeting a few specific insurance industry practices. Emanuel argued that the history of health care reform was proof that only incremental progress had succeeded in the past. Obama again declined, telling advisers he was not ready to give up on the comprehensive plan. According to reports, Emanuel aggressively pushed and himself admitted that he "begged" Obama for an entire week in the summer of 2009 to not pursue the ACA.

In his 2006 book, co-authored with Bruce Reed, The Plan: Big Ideas for America, Emanuel advocated a three-month compulsory universal service program for Americans between the ages of 18 and 25.

=== Economic policy ===
Emanuel is a strong proponent of free trade.

=== Foreign policy ===
During his original 2002 campaign, Emanuel supported "President Bush's position on Iraq." In the 2006 congressional primaries, Emanuel, then head of the Democratic congressional campaign committee, helped organize a run by Tammy Duckworth, an Iraq war veteran with no political experience, against grassroots candidate Christine Cegelis in Illinois' 6th district. Expedited withdrawal from Iraq was a central point of Cegelis' campaign and Duckworth opposed a withdrawal timetable. In 2005, Emanuel said that he would have voted for and supported the Iraq war even if he knew that Bush lied about Iraq having weapons of mass destruction since he believed removing Saddam Hussein was "the right thing to do".

Emanuel has been described as a "vocal Zionist". In June 2007, Emanuel condemned an outbreak of Palestinian violence in the Gaza Strip and criticized Arab countries for not applying the same kind of pressure on the Palestinians as they have on Israel. In 2025, Emanuel said he "support[s] the state of Israel", but that if he were elected president he would be willing to publicly disagree with Israeli policies. In November 2025, Emanuel urged "a long-term rebuilding of the narrative around Israel's needs" and added "If we do not grasp the depth of the situation, we will never fix it" at the annual General Assembly of the Jewish Federations of North America (JFNA).

In a July 2026 speech at Tel Aviv University, Emanuel criticized Israeli Prime Minister Benjamin Netanyahu, calling for an end to United States military aid to Israel and sanctions to fight violence against Palestinians in the West Bank as well as illegal construction of settlements there. He proposed a peace process that would have 22 Arab states have diplomatic relations with Israel and the Arab League to support the creation of a Palestinian entity.

== Electoral history ==
Mayor of Chicago

Chicago mayoral election, 2015: Run-off
Party	Candidate	Votes	%
Nonpartisan	Rahm Emanuel (incumbent)	319,543	55.7
Nonpartisan	Jesús "Chuy" García	253,981	44.3
Total votes		573,524	100

Chicago mayoral election, 2015: Primary
Party	Candidate	Votes	%
Nonpartisan	Rahm Emanuel (incumbent)	218,217	45.63
Nonpartisan	Jesús "Chuy" García	160,414	33.55
Nonpartisan	Willie Wilson	50,960	10.66
Nonpartisan	Robert Fioretti	35,363	7.39
Nonpartisan	William "Dock" Wallis III	13,250	2.77
Total votes		478,204	100

Chicago Mayoral Election, 2011 (general election)
Party	Candidate	Votes	%
Nonpartisan	Rahm Emanuel	323,546	55.25
Nonpartisan	Gery Chico	140,362	23.97
Nonpartisan	Miguel del Valle	54,342	9.28
Nonpartisan	Carol Moseley Braun	52,483	8.96
Nonpartisan	Patricia Van Pelt Watkins	9,604	1.64
Nonpartisan	William "Dock" Walls III	5,291	0.90
Total votes		585,628	100

US House of Representatives

U.S. House, 5th District of Illinois (General Election)
Year	Winning candidate	Party	Pct	Opponent	Party	Pct	Opponent	Party	Pct
2002	Rahm Emanuel	Democratic	67%	Mark Augusti	Republican	29%	Frank Gonzalez	Libertarian	4%
2004	Rahm Emanuel (inc.)	Democratic	76%	Bruce Best	Republican	24%			
2006	Rahm Emanuel (inc.)	Democratic	78%	Kevin White	Republican	22%			
2008	Rahm Emanuel (inc.)	Democratic	74%	Tom Hanson	Republican	22%	Alan Augustson	Green	4%

== Personal life ==
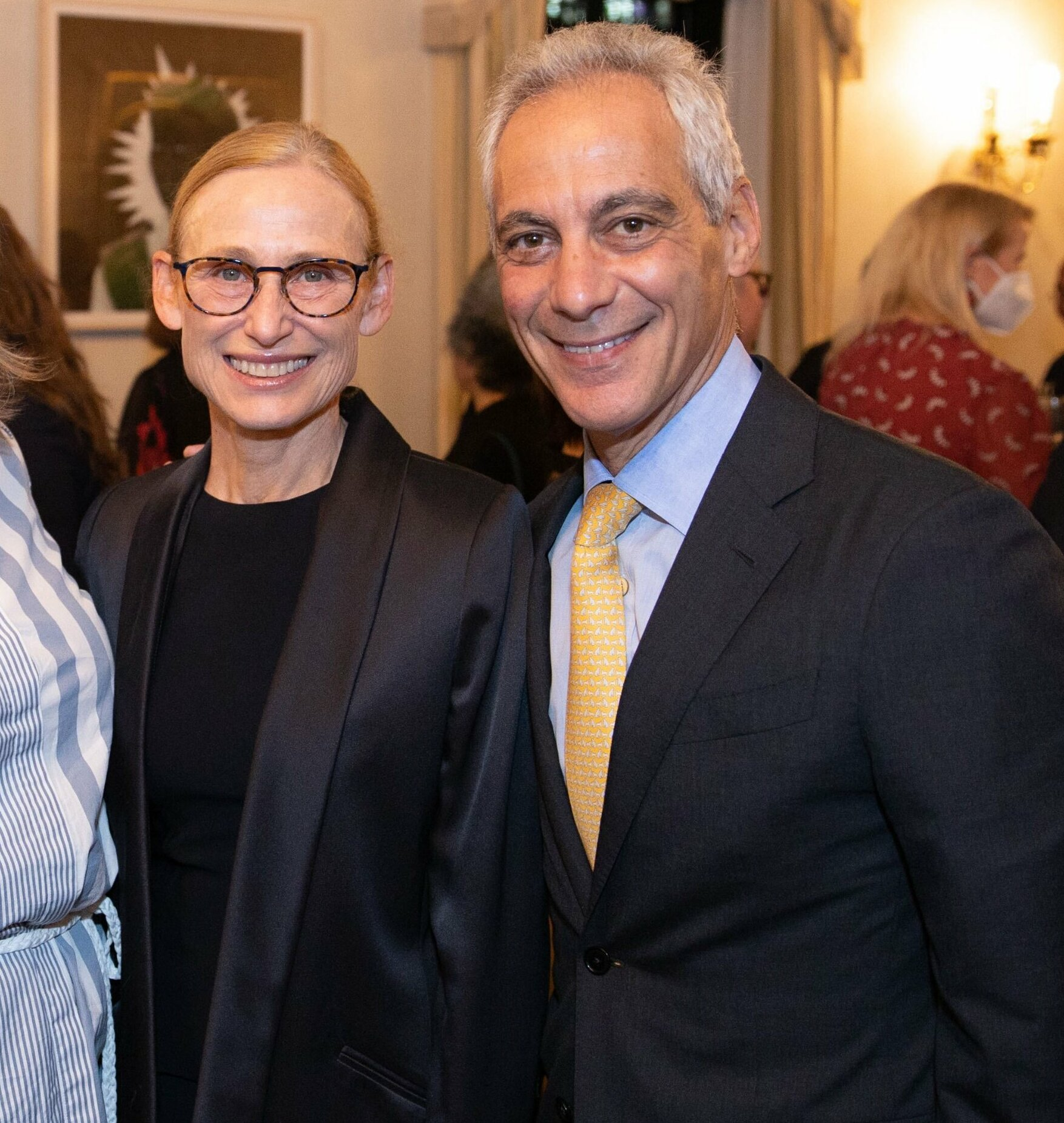
Emanuel and his wife, Amy Rule, in 2022

Emanuel and his wife, Amy Merritt Rule, have a son and two daughters. As of 2011, their family lived in the Ravenswood neighborhood on Chicago's North Side. Rule converted to Judaism shortly before their wedding. Emanuel is a close friend of fellow Chicagoan David Axelrod, chief strategist for Obama's 2008 and 2012 presidential campaigns, and Axelrod signed the ketuba, the Jewish marriage contract, at Emanuel's wedding. The Emanuels are members of the Chicago synagogue Anshe Sholom B'nai Israel. Rabbi Asher Lopatin of the congregation described Emanuel's family as "a very involved Jewish family", adding that "Amy was one of the teachers for a class for children during the High Holidays two years ago". Emanuel has said of his Judaism: "I am proud of my heritage and treasure the values it has taught me." Emanuel's children attended the private University of Chicago Laboratory Schools in the Hyde Park neighborhood on the South Side of Chicago.

Each year during the winter holidays, Emanuel takes a family trip on which his children can be exposed to other cultures and parts of the world. Prior family trips have been to Vietnam, India, Kenya, Zambia, and South America. His 2015 holiday trip was scheduled for the island of Cuba. Emanuel is a longtime JoJo fan and attended her concert in Chicago in November 2016. He trains for and participates in triathlons. In 2011, he scored 9th out of 80 competitors in his age group. A passionate cyclist, he rides a custom-built, state-of-the-art Parlee road bike.

Emanuel lost a part of the middle finger on his right hand due to an injury while using a meat slicer. This was when he worked at Arby's while in high school.

== Publications ==
=== Books ===
- The Plan: Big Ideas for America, PublicAffairs, August 2006 (co-authored with Bruce Reed)

=== Articles ===
- "Why Chicago Leads on Police Reform", The New York Times, May 8, 2019
- "How Not to Lose to Donald Trump", The Atlantic, March 10, 2019

== See also ==
- History of the Jews in Chicago
- List of Jewish members of the United States Congress
- Revolving door (politics)

== Notes ==
Political offices
New office	Senior Advisor to the President; 1993–1998; Served alongside: George Stephanopoulos, Sidney Blumenthal	Succeeded by Doug Sosnik
Preceded by Janet Mullins	White House Director of Political Affairs; 1993	Succeeded by Joan Baggett
Preceded by Josh Bolten	White House Chief of Staff; 2009–2010	Succeeded by Pete Rouse; Acting
Preceded by Richard M. Daley	Mayor of Chicago; 2011–2019	Succeeded by Lori Lightfoot
U.S. House of Representatives
Preceded by Rod Blagojevich	Member of the U.S. House of Representatives from Illinois's 5th congressional district 2003–2009	Succeeded by Mike Quigley
Party political offices
Preceded by Bob Matsui	Chair of the Democratic Congressional Campaign Committee; 2005–2007	Succeeded by Chris Van Hollen
Preceded by Jim Clyburn	Chair of the House Democratic Caucus; 2007–2009	Succeeded by John Larson
Diplomatic posts
Preceded by Bill Hagerty	United States Ambassador to Japan; 2022–2025	Succeeded by George Edward Glass
U.S. order of precedence (ceremonial)
Preceded by Tom Corcoran as Former US Representative	Order of precedence of the United States	Succeeded by Melissa Bean as Former US Representative
