= Sergey Lopatin =

Sergey Lopatin may refer to

- Sergey Lopatin (weightlifter, born 1939), Russian weightlifter
- Sergey Lopatin (weightlifter, born 1961), Russian weightlifter
