= HouseQuake =

- DVD cover art
- Directed by: Karen Elizabeth Price
- Written by: Karen Elizabeth Price
- Produced by: Jill Aske; Karen Elizabeth Price; Aymae Sulick
- Cinematography: Bryan Donnell; Aymae Sulick
- Edited by: Julie Janata; Karen Elizabeth Price; Jason Rosenfield
- Music by: Michael E. Price; Dan Raziel
- Distributed by: Brainstorm Media
- Release date: August 8, 2009 (Rhode Island International Film Festival)
- Running time: 90 minutes
- Country: United States
- Language: English

HouseQuake is a 2009 American documentary film written and directed by Karen Elizabeth Price.

== Synopsis ==
This documentary film covers the Democratic Party's successful attempt to take control of the United States House of Representatives from Republicans in 2006. It focuses on the strategy employed by the Democratic Congressional Campaign Committee Chairman Rep. Rahm Emanuel and follows Democratic challengers and Republican incumbents in seven races across the country through election night. The significant gains made by Democrats constituted a wave election. Democrats subsequently lost control to Republicans in 2010. Emanuel became President Barack Obama's first Chief of Staff in 2009 and was elected Mayor of Chicago in 2011.

== Subjects ==
- Naftali Bendavid
- Donna Brazile
- George Bush
- James Carville
- Wesley Clark
- Emanuel Cleaver
- Bill Clinton
- James Clyburn
- Charlie Cook
- Tammy Duckworth
- Brad Ellsworth
- Rahm Emanuel
- Diane Farrell
- Newt Gingrich
- Stanley Greenberg
- Baron Hill
- John Hostettler
- Steny H. Hoyer
- Frank Luntz
- Tim Mahoney
- John McCain
- Jerry McNerney
- Joe Negron
- Barack Obama
- Norman Ornstein
- Nancy Pelosi
- Richard Pombo
- Charles Rangel
- Tom Reynolds
- Peter Roskam
- Phyllis Schlafly
- Christopher Shays
- Heath Shuler
- Mike Sodrel
- Chris Van Hollen
- Richard Viguerie
- Josh Kurtz

== Reception ==
The Washingtonian Made note that the documentary "takes a behind-the-scenes look at how the Democrats made a comeback in 2006" by following and illustrating how Rahm Emanuel "orchestrated one of the country’s most historic congressional elections." The film opens by showing Emanuel's appointment as chairman of the Democratic Congressional Campaign Committee and follows with a brief summation of what factors made the 2006 midterm elections important for the Democrats.

Political analyst Bill Schneider wrote in National Journal that the film's most startling scene is not written for the film, but was a story told by author Naftali Bendavid when Bendavid "recounts an incident at the end of Bill Clinton's first presidential campaign, when staff members gathered to celebrate victory."

== Recognition ==
The film was a 2009 winner of the 'Directorial Discovery Award' at Rhode Island International Film Festival.
