= Chicago Jewish Day School =

Jewish day school in Chicago, Illinois, US

Coordinates: 41.949341°N 87.698448°W

Chicago Jewish Day School (CJDS) is a private, multi-denominational Jewish day school in Irving Park, Chicago, Illinois, serving over 200 students from junior kindergarten to grade eight.

For the 2023-2024 school year, tuition ranges from $21,690 for preschool students to $30,560 for middle school students.

== Academics ==
CJDS follows a dual curriculum, integrating Hebrew and Judaic studies with secular subjects. In addition to academic subjects, physical education, art, and music are part of the regular school day, and enrichment activities (After School Adventures) such as chess, cooking, and yoga are offered in the afternoon.

Each year, grade eight students take a trip to the State of Israel.

== History ==
CJDS opened in 2003 with seven students added one grade level per year until 2011. In 2012, CJDS held its inaugural 8th grade graduation for five students. The school's founders included Rabbis Asher Lopatin, Michael Siegel of Anshe Emet Synagogue, and Aaron Mark Petuchowski of Temple Sholom.

CJDS was originally located in Edgewater before moving to Irving Park.

== Affiliations and Accreditations ==
CJDS has partnered with the Jewish United Fund and is accredited by the Independent Schools Association of the Central States (ISACS).

== See also ==
- History of the Jews in Chicago
