= Sergey Lopatin (weightlifter, born 1939) =

Russian weightlifter (1939–2004)

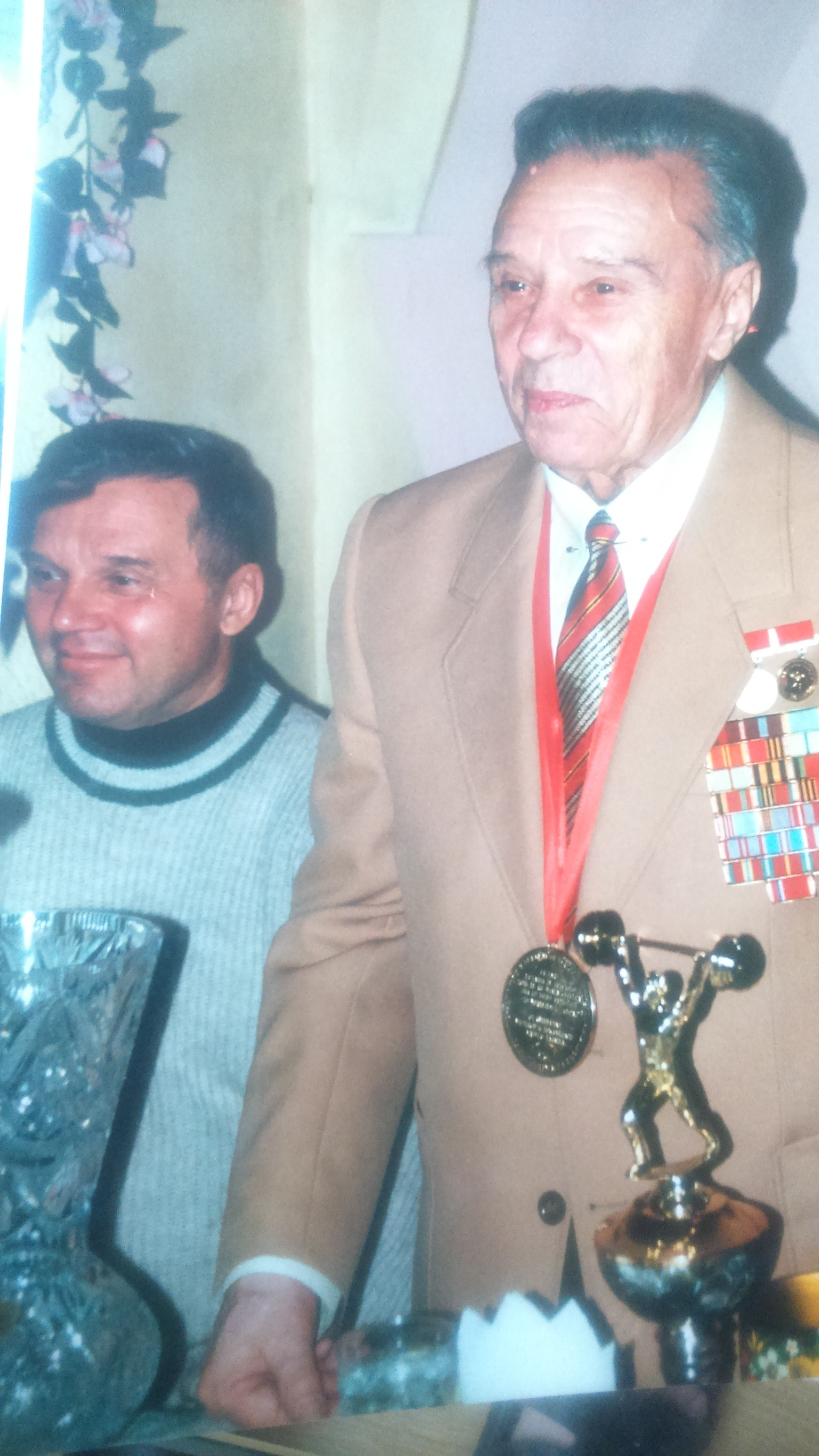
- Sergey and Evgeny Lopatin

Personal information
- Born: 19 March 1939 Saratov, Russia
- Died: 17 January 2004 (aged 64) Moscow Oblast, Russia

Sport
- Sport: Weightlifting
- Club: CSKA Moscow
- Coached by: Yevgeny Lopatin
Medal record
Representing the Soviet Union
World Weightlifting Championships
Silver medal – second place	1961 Vienna	-67.5 kg
European Weightlifting Championships
Silver medal – second place	1961 Vienna	-67.5 kg

Sergey Evgenyevich Lopatin (Russian: Сергей Евгеньевич Лопатин; 19 March 1939 – 17 January 2004) was a Russian lightweight weightlifter. Trained by his father, Olympic weightlifter Yevgeny Lopatin, he won silver medals at the world and European championships in 1961. Between 1961 and 1966, he set 11 ratified world records: six in the press, three in the snatch and two in the total. He won the Soviet title in 1961 and 1965.
