= Lopatin =

Lopatin may refer to:

- Lopatin (surname)
- Mount Lopatin, a mountain in Antarctica
- Ford & Lopatin, an American electronic music duo
