= Naftali Bendavid =

American journalist

Naftali Bendavid is the deputy campaign editor for The Washington Post covering the 2020 United States presidential election. He was a former Congressional reporter for The Wall Street Journal, the deputy Washington bureau chief, White House correspondent and Justice Department correspondent for the Chicago Tribune, as well as a reporter for the Miami Herald and Legal Times. He is also published in the Los Angeles Times, has appeared on NPR's Diane Rehm show and PBS' Washington Week, and is the author of The Thumpin': How Rahm Emanuel and the Democrats Learned to be Ruthless and Ended the Republican Revolution. He also edited Obama: The Essential Guide to the Democratic Nominee.

Bendavid graduated from Columbia University in 1985 with a BA in political science, and has a master's degree in journalism from Northwestern University.
