= Anshe Sholom B'nai Israel =

Modern Orthodox Jewish congregation and synagogue

- Location in Chicago

Religion
- Affiliation: Modern Orthodox
- Ecclesiastical or organizational status: Synagogue
- Leadership: Rabbi Aaron Finkelstein
- Status: Active

Location
- Location: 540 West Melrose Street, Lakeview, Chicago, Illinois 60657
- Country: United States
- Interactive map of Anshe Sholom B'nai Israel
- Coordinates: 41°56′29″N 87°38′36″W

Architecture
- Established: 1870 (as a congregation)
- Completed: 1940

Website
- asbi.org

Anshe Sholom B'nai Israel (Hebrew for: 'People of Peace' followed by 'Children of Israel') is a Modern Orthodox Jewish congregation and synagogue located at 540 West Melrose Street, in the Lakeview neighborhood on the north side of Chicago, Illinois, in the United States.

== History ==
The Anshe Sholom B'nai Israel Congregation was founded in 1870 as Ohave Sholom (Lovers of Peace) by a group of Lithuanian Jewish families primarily from Marijampolė, Lithuania. The congregation is considered to be the oldest Orthodox congregation still existing in Chicago.

In the summer of 1870, Duber (Dov Ber) Ginsburg, an immigrant from Marijampolė, appeared for services at the Bais Medrash Hagodol synagogue wearing a straw hat. The leaders of the shul considered it frivolous and threw him out. Offended, Ginsburg assembled a minyan (congregation) from his old-country friends and founded a competing shul (synagogue), Ohave Sholom Mariampol, at Polk and Dearborn Streets.

In 1871 the Great Chicago Fire drove many homeless Jewish men and women into the neighborhood, and membership grew rapidly. In 1892, the congregation merged with the Anshe Kalvarier shul (whose building had been demolished when 12th Street, now Roosevelt Road, was widened) and adopted the name, "Anshe Sholom Congregation." In 1894, they retained their first rabbi, Abraham Samuel Braude, who served until his death in 1907. It was long known unofficially as "The Mariampoler Shul" and also informally as "The Straw Hat Shul."

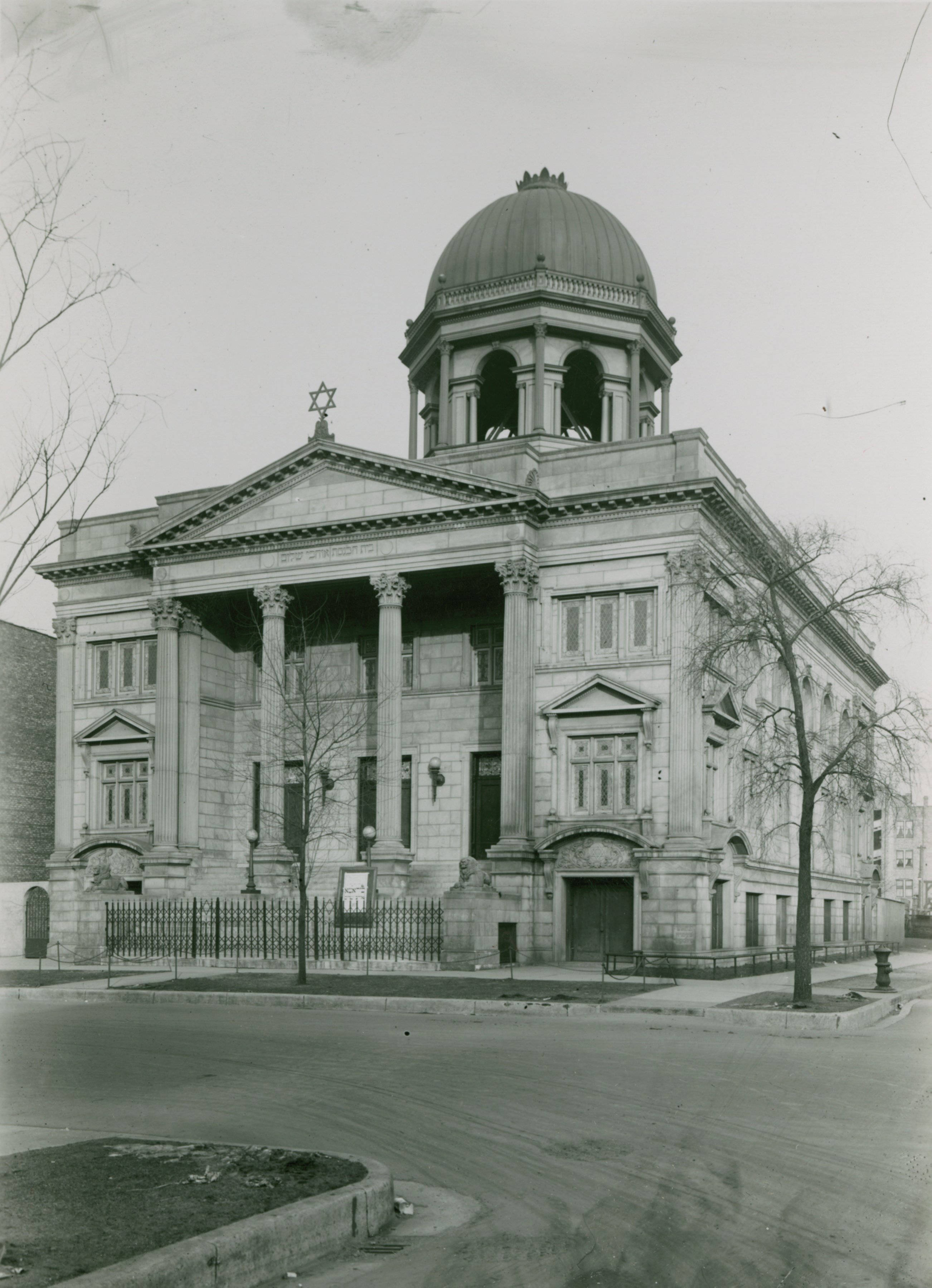
Original Building at Polk and Ashland

In 1910 Saul Silber became the rabbi and the congregation moved west into a new domed building by Chicago architect Alexander Levy at Polk and Ashland. However, the Jewish community was moving farther west into the Lawndale district, and so the congregation opened a branch on Homan Avenue and during the 1920s sold the Ashland Avenue structure to a Greek Orthodox Christian congregation. They soon built another building at Independence and Polk. It was also at this time that Silber helped to establish the Hebrew Theological College and served without salary as its first president, while continuing at Anshe Sholom until his death in 1946.

In 1940, a group of members opened a branch called "Lakeview Anshe Sholom Center" in a converted greystone residence at 540 West Melrose Street on the North Side, where Herman Davis became the rabbi in 1945.

Under Davis the congregation constructed a school building directly east of Anshe Sholom. After this a new shul was erected, and dedicated in 1959.

In 1960, the last few members of Congregation B'nai Israel in Old Town ceased operations in the 1300 block of Sedgwick Street, and the shul became "Lakeview Anshe Sholom B'nai Israel." Two years later the main Anshe Sholom Congregation on Independence Boulevard also merged, creating the present shul's name.

After Davis' death in 1975 Joseph Deitcher became the rabbi, and after Deitcher's death in 1994 Asher Lopatin succeeded him. In 2013, David Wolkenfeld succeeded Asher Lopatin and served as the rabbi for 10 years. Currently, the synagogue is under the leadership of Rabbi Aaron Finkelstein.

== See also ==
- History of the Jews in Chicago
