= Sergey Lopatin (weightlifter, born 1961) =

Russian heavyweight weightlifter (born 1961)

Personal information
- Born: 3 April 1961 (age 65)

Sport
- Sport: Weightlifting
Medal record
Representing Russia
World championships (masters)
Bronze medal – third place	2001 Kefalonia	-94 kg
Silver medal – second place	2002 Melbourne	-105 kg
Gold medal – first place	2003 Savannah	-105 kg
Gold medal – first place	2004 Baden	-105 kg
Silver medal – second place	2008 Argistoli, Kefalonia	+105 kg
Silver medal – second place	2011 Limassol	+105 kg

Sergey Lopatin (Russian: Сергей Лопатин, born 3 April 1961) is a Russian heavyweight weightlifter. Competing in the masters category, he won two world titles in the years 2003 and 2004, placing second in 2002, 2008 and 2011.

Lopatin took up weightlifting in 1974 and around 1980 was a member of the Soviet junior team. He then semi-retired, and returned to weightlifting in 1999, aged 38. He lives in Zheleznogorsk, where he works as a weightlifting coach and serves as a member of the city council.
