= Asher Lopatin =

American rabbi (born 1964)

Personal life
- Born: September 1, 1964 (age 62)
- Education: Boston University; University of Oxford; Maimonides School
- Occupation: Rabbi; Torah scholar

Religious life
- Religion: Modern Orthodox Judaism

Asher Lopatin (born September 1, 1964) is the Director of Community Relations at the Jewish Federation of Greater Ann Arbor in Ann Arbor, Michigan. In late August 2026, he began a leave of absence from the Jewish Federation to continue his efforts to promote Mike Rogers' U.S. Senate campaign without causing confusion about his role and the Jewish Federation's stance. Lopatin is a Modern Orthodox rabbi and leader of Kehillat Etz Chayim, an Modern Orthodox synagogue in Oak Park, Michigan, and a Jewish denominational pluralist. He is also the founder and executive director of the Detroit National Center for Civil Discourse, which has run a Fellowship in Civil Discourse at Wayne State University since September 2019. Previously, he was the president of Yeshivat Chovevei Torah (2013–2018) and the spiritual leader of Anshe Sholom B'nai Israel in Chicago, Illinois, before that. He is a Rhodes Scholar and a member of the Council on Foreign Relations.

== Biographical information ==
Lopatin is a graduate of the Maimonides School and received a B.A. in International Relations and Islamic Studies from Boston University. In 1989, he was awarded a Master of Philosophy from the University of Oxford in Medieval Arabic Thought. He has also done doctoral work at Oxford on Islamic fundamentalist attitudes toward Jews, authoring a chapter on Muslim–Jewish relations entitled "The Uncircumcised Jewish Heart (in Islamic and Qur'anic Thought)." Lopatin's academic honors include being a Rhodes Scholar, a Wexner Fellow, a Truman Scholar, and a Boston University Trustee Scholar. He is a member of Phi Beta Kappa. He received rabbinic ordination (semikhah) from both Rabbi Isaac Elchanan Theological Seminary of Yeshiva University in New York City in 1996 and Rabbi Aharon Soloveichik. Lopatin also received honorary semikhah from Yeshivat Chovevei Torah (YCT) in 2002.

Lopatin was the spiritual leader of Anshe Sholom B'nai Israel, a synagogue in Chicago's Lakeview neighborhood. He and his wife Rachel were founders of the multi-denominational Chicago Jewish Day School.

In 2006, during the political battle over the Chicago City Council ban on the sale of foie gras, Lopatin was widely quoted supporting the ban on the grounds that the Torah prohibits cruelty to animals, saying: "Chopped liver is good, but foie gras is bad."

In 2009, Lopatin proposed plans for a group of 200 families to immigrate to Israel and settle in the Negev. The plan was postponed indefinitely due to a serious illness in the Lopatin family.

In February 2012, Lopatin participated in an Indonesia Interfaith Middle East Peace Tour. Five rabbis, four Christian clergy, and three American Muslim clerics traveled through Indonesia (meeting with 12 Indonesian Muslim clerics), Dubai, Jerusalem, Ramallah, and Washington, D.C. Lopatin made blog posts about the journey on the website Morethodoxy.org.

On August 30, 2012, YCT's rabbinical school announced that Lopatin would succeed Rabbi Avi Weiss, its founder, as president of the organization.

In August 2017, Lopatin announced that the 2017–2018 academic year would be his last as president of YCT.

On August 31, 2026, Lopatin published an opinion piece endorsing Republican Mike Rogers for Michigan's open U.S. Senate seat.

== Affiliations ==
- Chicago Board of Rabbis, vice president (multi-denominational) - past
- International Rabbinic Fellowship, board member (Orthodox)
- Chicago Jewish Day School, board of trustees, ex officio ("halachic, inclusive")- past

== Honors ==
- American Jewish Congress Young Leadership Award, 1998
- Maimonides School Pillar of Maimonides Award, 2000
- Associated Talmud Torahs of Chicago Keter Torah Award, 2001
- Yeshivat Chovevei Torah Honorary Smicha, 2002
- Newsweek Top 25 Pulpit Rabbis (#22), 2008
- Newsweek America's 25 Most Vibrant Congregations (Anshe Sholom B'nai Israel), 2009
- Newsweek Top 50 Rabbis (#21), 2011
- Newsweek Top 50 Rabbis (#24), 2012

== Ideological positions ==
Lopatin has expressed a lack of affinity to Orthodox Judaism, expressing that the denominational lines separating Jews are less important than the commitments shared by Orthodox, Conservative, Reform, and non-aligned Jews.

I am a pluralist: We need to learn from all Jews, and connect and relate to all Jews – Reform, Conservative, Renewal; I believe it is critical for Judaism that we engage with the greater society as well... While there is a lot to critique in the Orthodox world – Modern, Centrist and Chareidi – all of us sometimes take a strident attitude that may not exhibit sufficient respect and love for our fellow Jews and their motivations. All of us can make an effort to try to make our first response be one of embracing all of Orthodoxy – all Jews of course, and all human beings – and being open to learning – sometimes with a critical, but respectful ear – from our fellow Orthodox Jews.
