= Yevgeny Lopatin =

Soviet weightlifter (1917–2011)

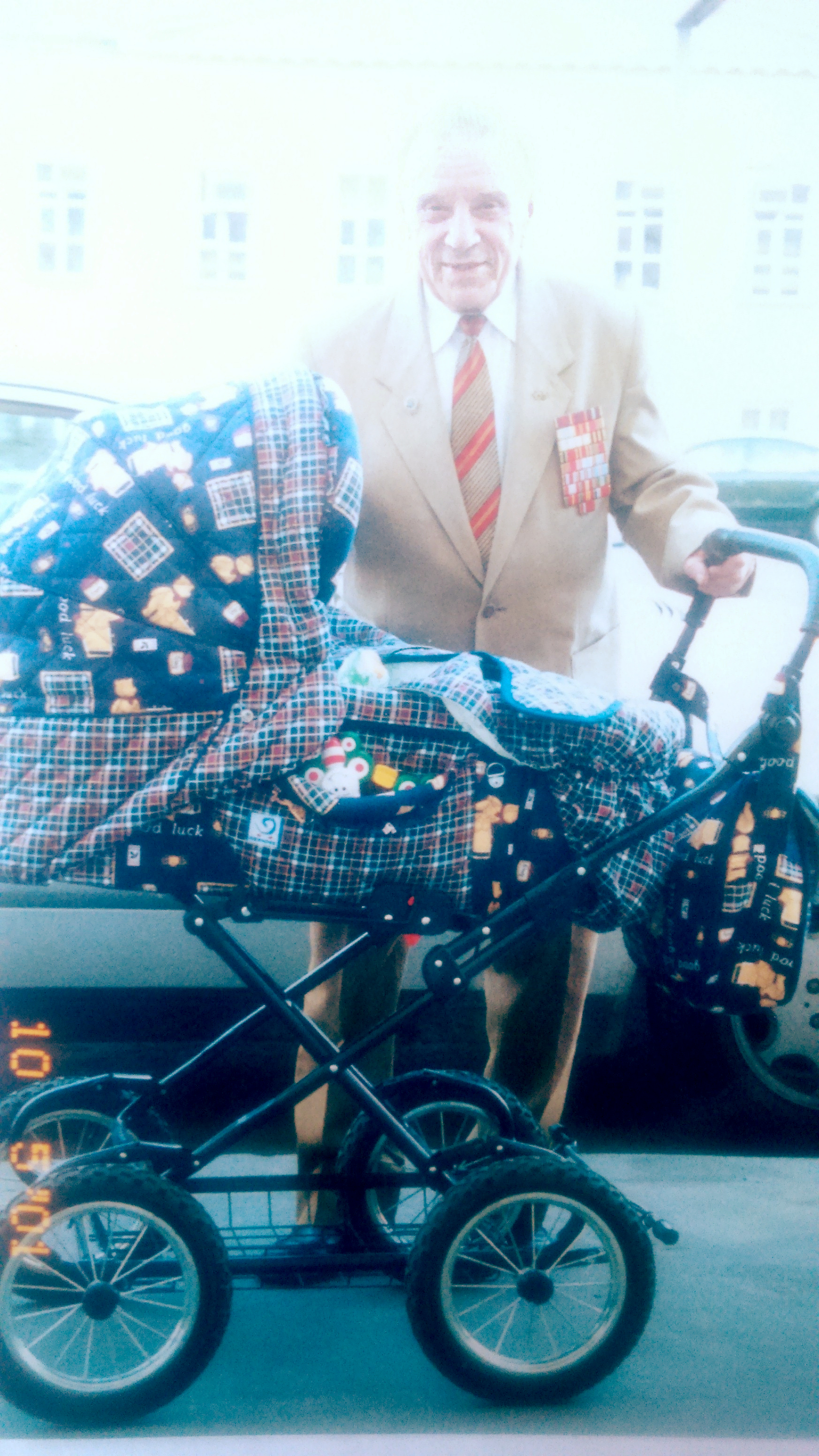
- Yevgeny Lopatin in his later years

Personal information
- Born: 26 December 1917 Balashov, Russian SFSR
- Died: 21 July 2011 (aged 93)
- Weight: 67 kg (148 lb)

Sport
- Sport: Weightlifting
- Club: Dynamo Moscow
Medal record
Representing Soviet Union
Olympic Games
Silver medal – second place	1952 Helsinki	Lightweight
World Weightlifting Championships
Silver medal – second place	1950 Paris	Featherweight
European Weightlifting Championships
Silver medal – second place	1947 Helsinki	Featherweight
Gold medal – first place	1950 Paris	Featherweight
Gold medal – first place	1952 Helsinki	Lightweight

Yevgeny Ivanovich Lopatin (26 December 1917 – 21 July 2011) was a Soviet weightlifter. He competed at the 1952 Summer Olympics in Helsinki and won a silver medal in the lightweight division.

== Biography ==
Lopatin was born in Balashov to a locksmith and a teacher of Russian. His father and younger sister died of cholera when he was 3, and the rest of the family suffered malnourishment during the Russian Civil War. They moved to Saratov, where in 1937 Lopatin took up weightlifting wishing to become stronger and healthier. The same year he married his classmate at school, Lidiya; they had a son Sergei, born on 19 March 1939.

Lopatin's success in local and regional tournaments was interrupted by World War II. By then he lived with his family in Leningrad. His second son was born there in 1942, but died of malnutrition. The family was evacuated around 1942, first Lopatin and then his wife and son. Later Lopatin was enlisted to the Soviet Army. He was injured in the Battle of Stalingrad and for many months after that could not use his left hand. He spent the rest of the war recovering as a coach at a military school. After the war Lopatin resumed his weightlifting career and reigned as the Soviet featherweight champion in 1947, 1948, and 1950, finishing as runner-up in 1945, 1946, and 1949, and in third place in 1951. He took silver in the division at the 1947 European Weightlifting Championships in Helsinki and gold in the same event at the 1950 edition in Paris. That same year he took silver in the featherweight division at the World Weightlifting Championships. As competition in the featherweight field grew, Lopatin switched to the lightweight division and once again became the Soviet champion prior to his attendance at the 1952 Summer Olympics, after which he announced his retirement from active competition. He worked as a coach at Dynamo Stadium in Moscow from 1949 through 1998. He died on 21 July 2011.
